= List of birds of Botswana =

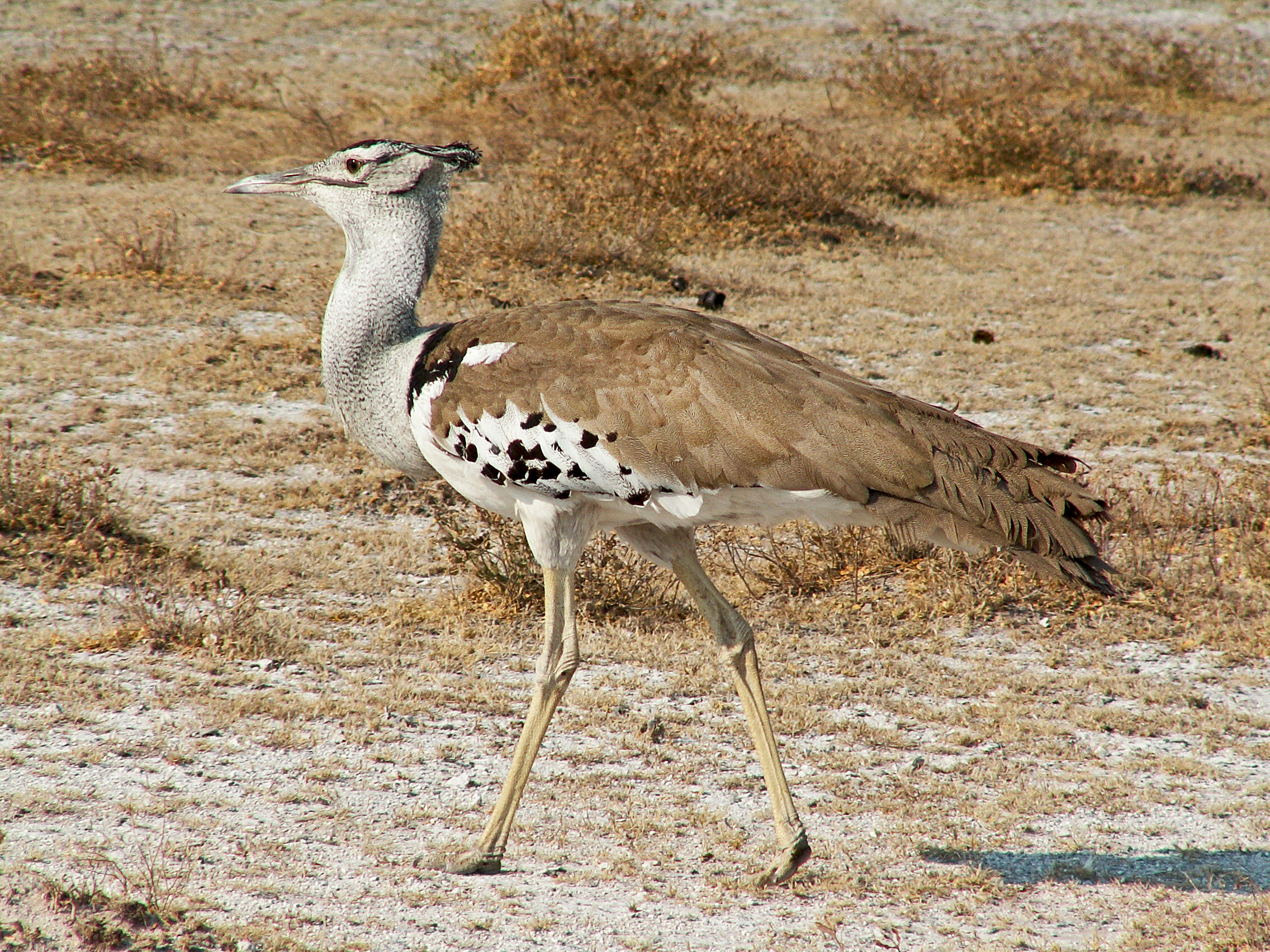
The kori bustard is the national bird of Botswana.

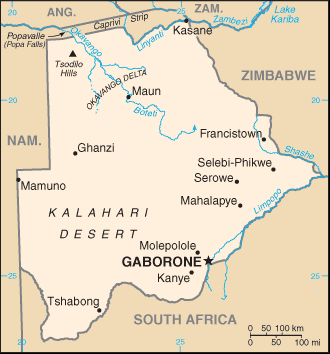
A map of Botswana

This is a list of the bird species recorded in Botswana. The avifauna of Botswana included a total of 615 species, as of May 2023, according to BirdLife Botswana's Checklist of Birds in Botswana, supplemented by Avibase. Of them, three have been introduced by humans. None are endemic.

This list's taxonomic treatment (designation and sequence of orders, families and species) and nomenclature (English and scientific names) are those of The Clements Checklist of Birds of the World, 2022 edition. Differences in common and scientific names between the Clements taxonomy and that of BirdLife Botswana are frequent but not noted here.

The following tags highlight several categories of occurrence other than regular migrants and residents; the tags follow the BirdLife Botswana list usage.

- (A) Accidental - a species which has been recorded 10 or fewer times in Botswana
- (B) Uncommon - a species which has been recorded more than 10 times but for which BirdLife Botswana wishes to receive more records so as to better assess their status
- (I) Introduced - a species introduced to Botswana as a consequence, direct or indirect, of human actions, and which has a self-sustaining population.

== Ostriches ==
Order: Struthioniformes Family: Struthionidae

The ostriches are flightless birds native to Africa, and are the largest living species of bird. They are distinctive in their appearance, with a long neck and legs with the ability to run at high speeds.

- Common ostrich, Struthio camelus
  - South African ostrich, Struthio camelus australis

== Ducks, geese, and waterfowl ==
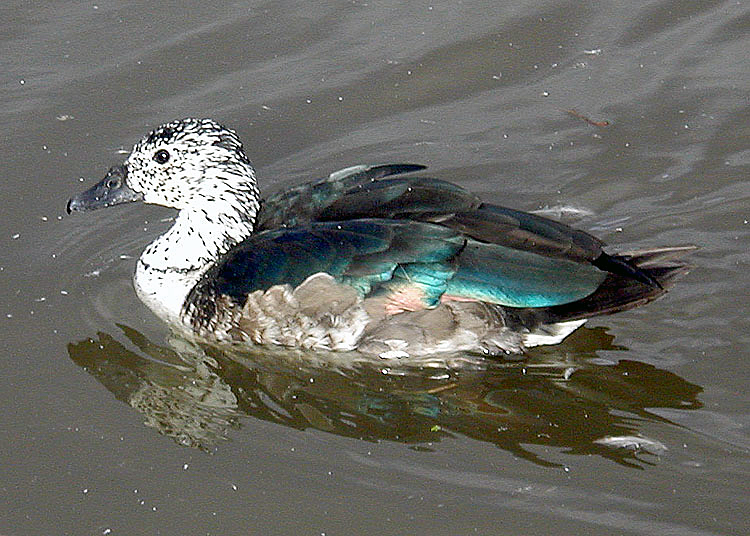
Knob-billed duck

Order: Anseriformes Family: Anatidae

Anatidae includes the ducks and most duck-like waterfowl, such as geese and swans. These birds are adapted to an aquatic existence with webbed feet, flattened bills, and feathers that are excellent at shedding water due to an oily coating.

- White-faced whistling-duck, Dendrocygna viduata
- Fulvous whistling-duck, Dendrocygna bicolor (B)
- White-backed duck, Thalassornis leuconotus (B)
- Knob-billed duck, Sarkidiornis melanotos
- Egyptian goose, Alopochen aegyptiaca
- South African shelduck, Tadorna cana
- Spur-winged goose, Plectropterus gambensis
- African pygmy-goose, Nettapus auritus
- Garganey, Spatula querquedula (A)
- Blue-billed teal, Spatula hottentota
- Cape shoveler, Spatula smithii
- African black duck, Anas sparsa (B)
- Yellow-billed duck, Anas undulata
- Cape teal, Anas capensis
- Red-billed duck, Anas erythrorhyncha
- Northern pintail, Anas acuta (A)
- Southern pochard, Netta erythrophthalma
- Maccoa duck, Oxyura maccoa (B)

== Guineafowl ==
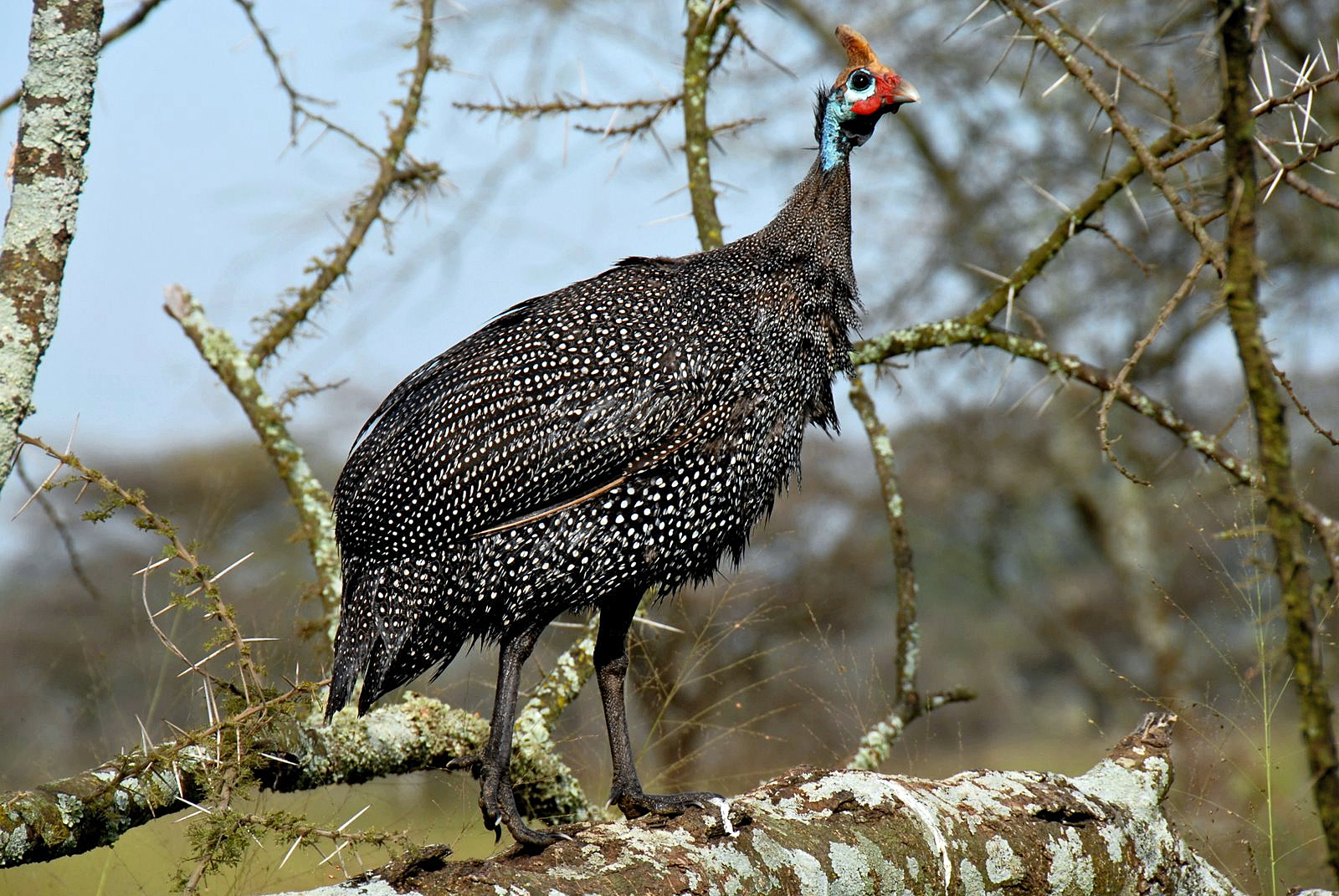
Helmeted guineafowl

Order: Galliformes Family: Numididae

Guineafowl are a group of African, seed-eating, ground-nesting birds that resemble partridges, but with featherless heads and spangled grey plumage.

- Helmeted guineafowl, Numida meleagris
- Western crested guineafowl, Guttera verreauxi (A)

== Pheasants, grouse, and allies ==
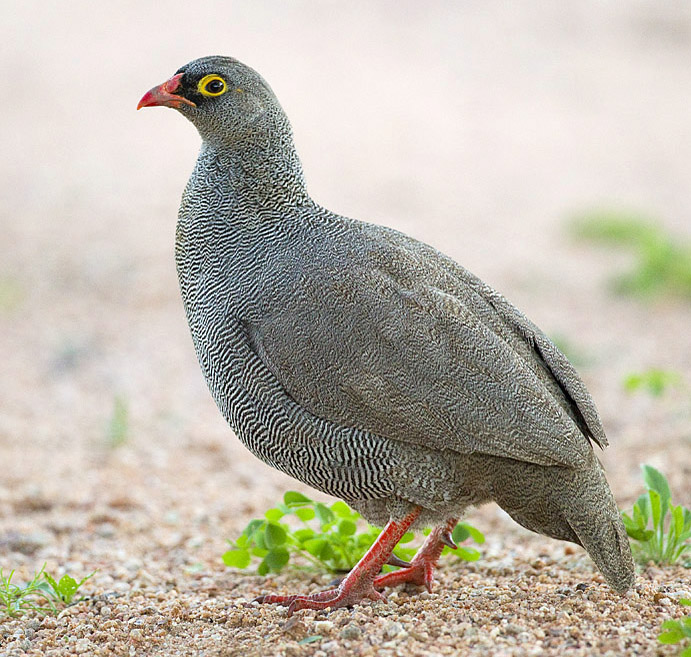
Red-billed francolin

Order: Galliformes Family: Phasianidae

The Phasianidae are a family of terrestrial birds which consists of quails, partridges, snowcocks, francolins, spurfowls, tragopans, monals, pheasants, peafowls, and jungle fowls. In general, they are plump (although they vary in size) and have broad, relatively short wings.

- Crested francolin, Ortygornis sephaena
- Coqui francolin, Campocolinus coqui
- Orange River francolin, Scleroptila gutturalis
- Blue quail, Synoicus adansonii
- Common quail, Coturnix coturnix (B)
- Harlequin quail, Coturnix delegorguei
- Red-billed francolin, Pternistis adspersus
- Natal francolin, Pternistis natalensis
- Swainson's francolin, Pternistis swainsonii

== Flamingos ==
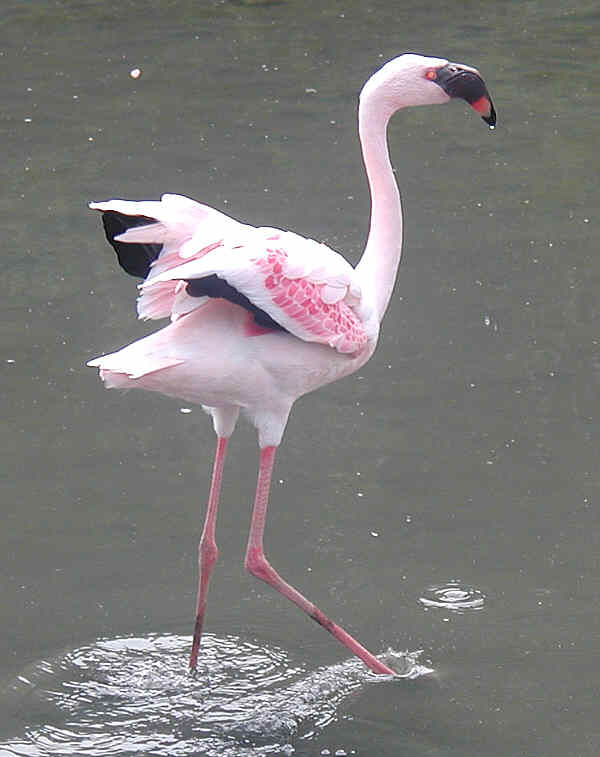
Lesser flamingo

Order: Phoenicopteriformes Family: Phoenicopteridae

Flamingos are gregarious wading birds, usually 3 to 5 feet (0.9 to 1.5 m) tall, found in both the Western and Eastern Hemispheres. Flamingos filter-feed on shellfish and algae. Their oddly shaped beaks are specially adapted to separate mud and silt from the food they consume and, uniquely, are used upside-down.

- Greater flamingo, Phoenicopterus roseus
- Lesser flamingo, Phoeniconaias minor (B)

== Grebes ==
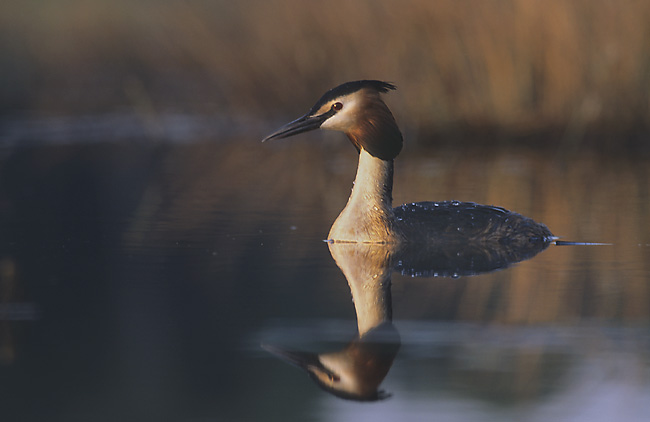
Great crested grebe

Order: Podicipediformes Family: Podicipedidae

Grebes are small to medium-large freshwater diving birds. They have lobed toes and are excellent swimmers and divers. However, they have their feet placed far back on the body, making them quite ungainly on land.

- Little grebe, Tachybaptus ruficollis
- Great crested grebe, Podiceps cristatus
- Eared grebe, Podiceps nigricollis (B)

== Pigeons and doves ==
Order: Columbiformes Family: Columbidae

Pigeons and doves are stout-bodied birds with short necks and short slender bills with a fleshy cere.

- Rock pigeon, Columba livia (I)
- Speckled pigeon, Columba guinea
- European turtle-dove, Streptopelia turtur (A)
- Mourning collared-dove, Streptopelia decipiens
- Red-eyed dove, Streptopelia semitorquata
- Ring-necked dove, Streptopelia capicola
- Laughing dove, Spilopelia senegalensis
- Emerald-spotted wood-dove, Turtur chalcospilos
- Namaqua dove, Oena capensis
- African green-pigeon, Treron calvus
- African olive pigeon, Columba arquatrix

== Sandgrouse ==
Order: Pterocliformes Family: Pteroclidae

Sandgrouse have small pigeon-like heads and necks, but sturdy compact bodies. They have long pointed wings and sometimes tails and a fast direct flight. Flocks fly to watering holes at dawn and dusk. Their legs are feathered down to the toes.

- Namaqua sandgrouse, Pterocles namaqua
- Yellow-throated sandgrouse, Pterocles gutturalis
- Double-banded sandgrouse, Pterocles bicinctus
- Burchell's sandgrouse, Pterocles burchelli

== Bustards ==
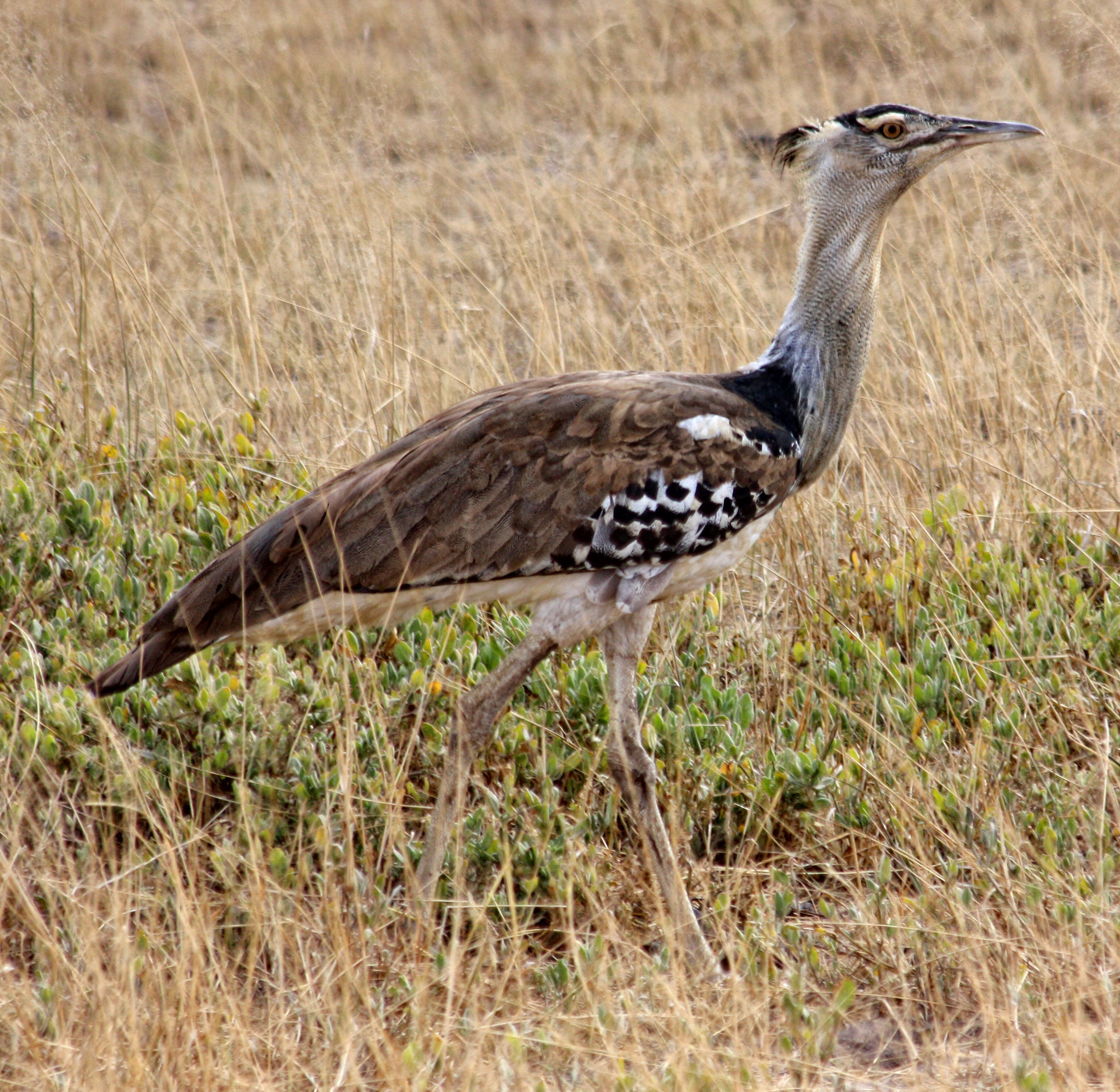
Kori bustard

Order: Otidiformes Family: Otididae

Bustards are large terrestrial birds mainly associated with dry open country and steppes in the Old World. They are omnivorous and nest on the ground. They walk steadily on strong legs and big toes, pecking for food as they go. They have long broad wings with "fingered" wingtips and striking patterns in flight. Many have interesting mating displays.

- Kori bustard, Ardeotis kori (B)
- Ludwig's bustard, Neotis ludwigii (A)
- Denham's bustard, Neotis denhami (B)
- White-bellied bustard, Eupodotis senegalensis (A)
- Red-crested bustard, Lophotis ruficrista
- White-quilled Bustard, Afrotis afraoides
- Black-bellied bustard, Lissotis melanogaster

== Turacos ==
Order: Musophagiformes Family: Musophagidae

The turacos, plantain eaters, and go-away-birds make up the bird family Musophagidae. They are medium-sized arboreal birds. The turacos and plantain eaters are brightly coloured, usually in blue, green, or purple. The go-away birds are mostly grey and white.

- Schalow's turaco, Tauraco schalowi (A)
- Purple-crested turaco, Gallirex porphyreolophus (A)
- Ross's turaco, Tauraco rossae (A)
- Gray go-away-bird, Crinifer concolor

== Cuckoos ==
Order: Cuculiformes Family: Cuculidae

The family Cuculidae includes cuckoos, roadrunners, and anis. These birds are of variable size with slender bodies, long tails, and strong legs.

- Burchell's coucal, Centropus burchellii
- Senegal coucal, Centropus senegalensis
- Coppery-tailed coucal, Centropus cupreicaudus
- White-browed coucal, Centropus superciliosus
- Black coucal, Centropus grillii (B)
- Great spotted cuckoo, Clamator glandarius
- Levaillant's cuckoo, Clamator levaillantii
- Pied cuckoo, Clamator jacobinus
- Thick-billed cuckoo, Pachycoccyx audeberti (B)
- Diederik cuckoo, Chrysococcyx caprius
- Klaas's cuckoo, Chrysococcyx klaas
- African emerald cuckoo, Chrysococcyx cupreus (B)
- Black cuckoo, Cuculus clamosus
- Red-chested cuckoo, Cuculus solitarius
- African cuckoo, Cuculus gularis
- Common cuckoo, Cuculus canorus (B)

== Nightjars and allies ==
Order: Caprimulgiformes Family: Caprimulgidae

Nightjars are medium-sized nocturnal birds that usually nest on the ground. They have long wings, short legs, and very short bills. Most have small feet, of little use for walking, and long pointed wings. Their soft plumage is camouflaged to resemble bark or leaves.

- Pennant-winged nightjar, Caprimulgus vexillarius (B)
- Eurasian nightjar, Caprimulgus europaeus (A)
- Rufous-cheeked nightjar, Caprimulgus rufigena
- Fiery-necked nightjar, Caprimulgus pectoralis
- Swamp nightjar, Caprimulgus natalensis (B)
- Freckled nightjar, Caprimulgus tristigma
- Square-tailed nightjar, Caprimulgus fossii

== Swifts ==
Order: Caprimulgiformes Family: Apodidae

Swifts are small birds which spend the majority of their lives flying. These birds have very short legs and never settle voluntarily on the ground, perching instead only on vertical surfaces. Many swifts have long swept-back wings which resemble a crescent or boomerang.

- Bat-like spinetail, Neafrapus boehmi (A)
- Alpine swift, Tachymarptis melba (B)
- Common swift, Apus apus
- African swift, Apus barbatus (B)
- Bradfield's swift, Apus bradfieldi (A)
- Little swift, Apus affinis
- Horus swift, Apus horus (B)
- White-rumped swift, Apus caffer
- African palm-swift, Cypsiurus parvus

== Flufftails ==
Order: Gruiformes Family: Sarothruridae

The flufftails are a small family of ground-dwelling birds found only in Madagascar and sub-Saharan Africa.

- Buff-spotted flufftail, Sarothrura elegans (A)
- Red-chested flufftail, Sarothrura rufa (B)

== Rails, gallinules, and coots ==
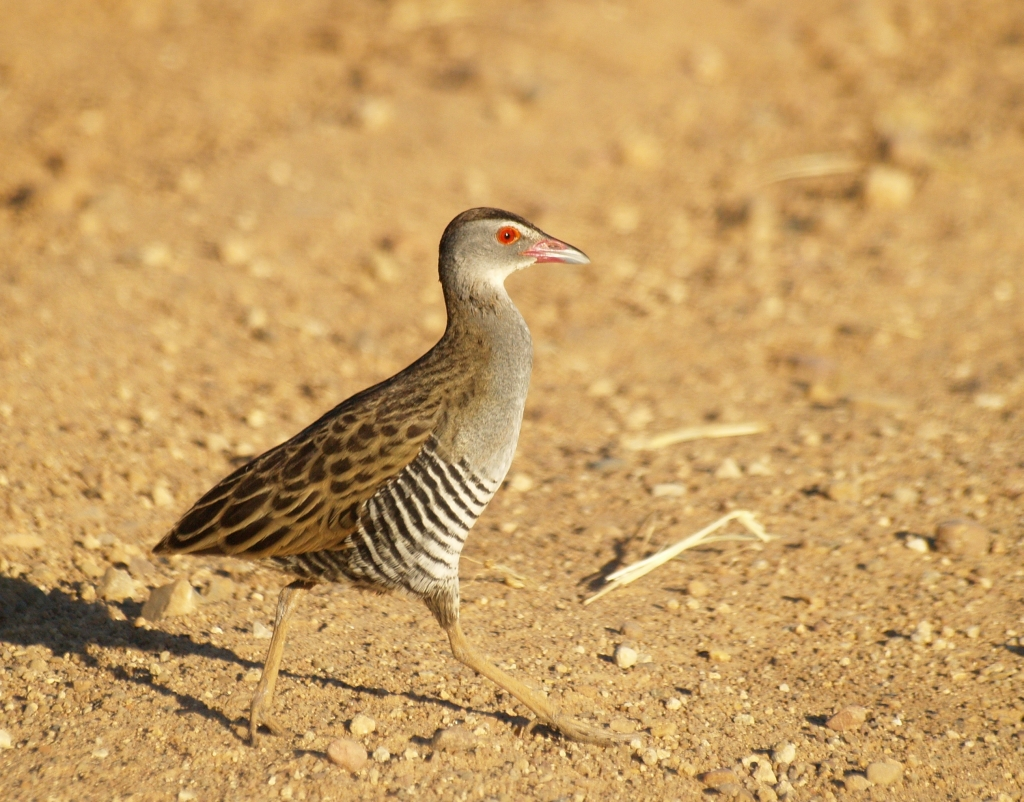
African crake

Order: Gruiformes Family: Rallidae

Rallidae is a large family of small to medium-sized birds which includes the rails, crakes, coots, and gallinules. Typically they inhabit dense vegetation in damp environments near lakes, swamps, or rivers. In general they are shy and secretive birds, making them difficult to observe. Most species have strong legs and long toes which are well adapted to soft uneven surfaces. They tend to have short, rounded wings and to be weak fliers.

- African rail, Rallus caerulescens (B)
- Corn crake, Crex crex (A)
- African crake, Crecopsis egregia (B)
- Spotted crake, Porzana porzana (B)
- Lesser moorhen, Paragallinula angulata
- Eurasian moorhen, Gallinula chloropus
- Red-knobbed coot, Fulica cristata
- Allen's gallinule, Porphyrio alleni
- African swamphen, Porphyrio madagascariensis
- Striped crake, Aenigmatolimnas marginalis (B)
- Black crake, Zapornia flavirostra
- Baillon's crake, Zapornia pusilla

== Finfoots ==
Order: Gruiformes Family: Heliornithidae

Heliornithidae is a small family of tropical birds with webbed lobes on their feet similar to those of grebes and coots.

- African finfoot, Podica senegalensis (B)

== Cranes ==
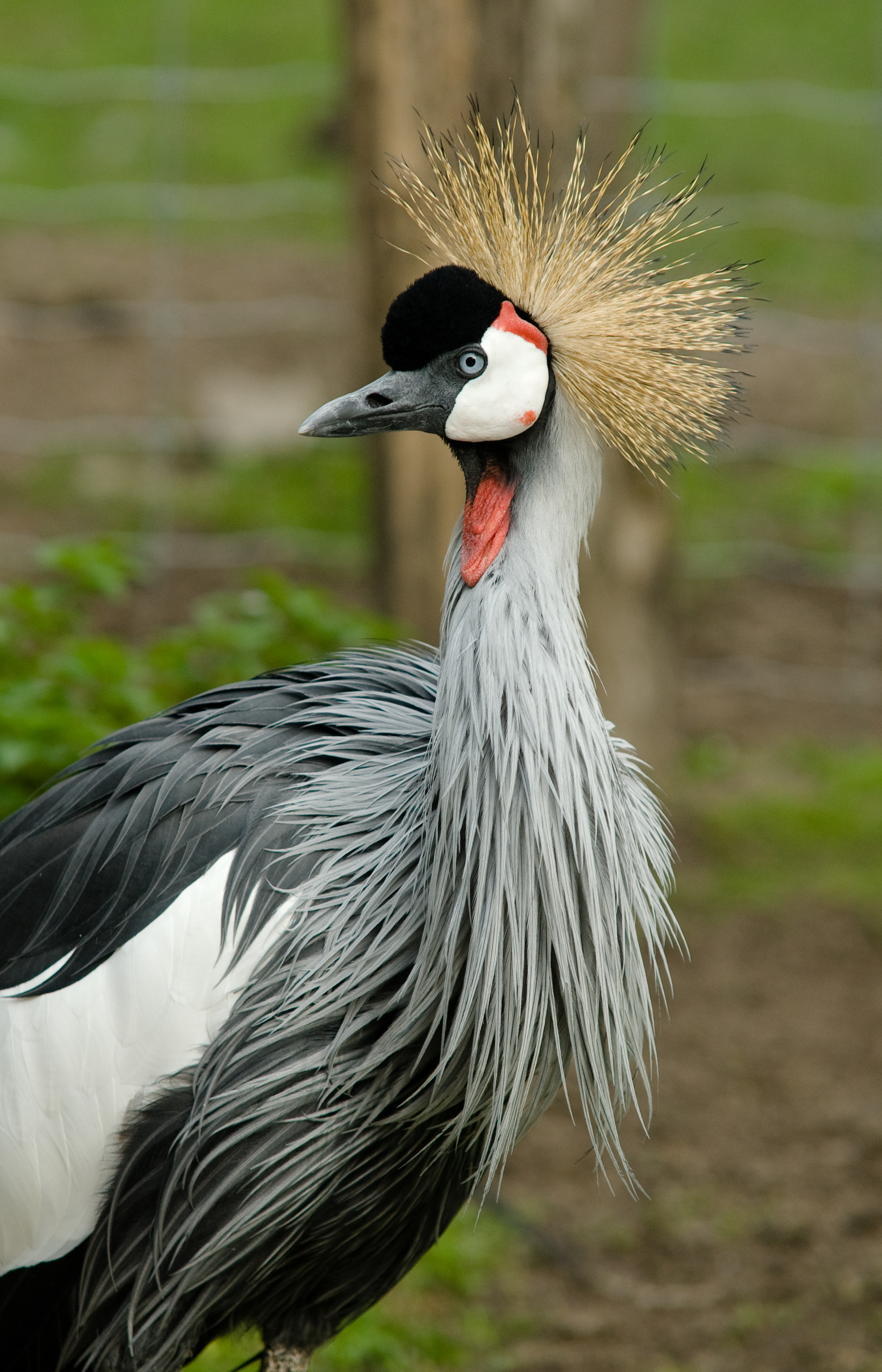
Gray crowned-crane

Order: Gruiformes Family: Gruidae

Cranes are large, long-legged, and long-necked birds. Unlike the similar-looking but unrelated herons, cranes fly with necks outstretched, not pulled back. Most have elaborate and noisy courting displays or "dances".

- Gray crowned-crane, Balearica regulorum (B)
- Wattled crane, Grus carunculata (B)

== Thick-knees ==
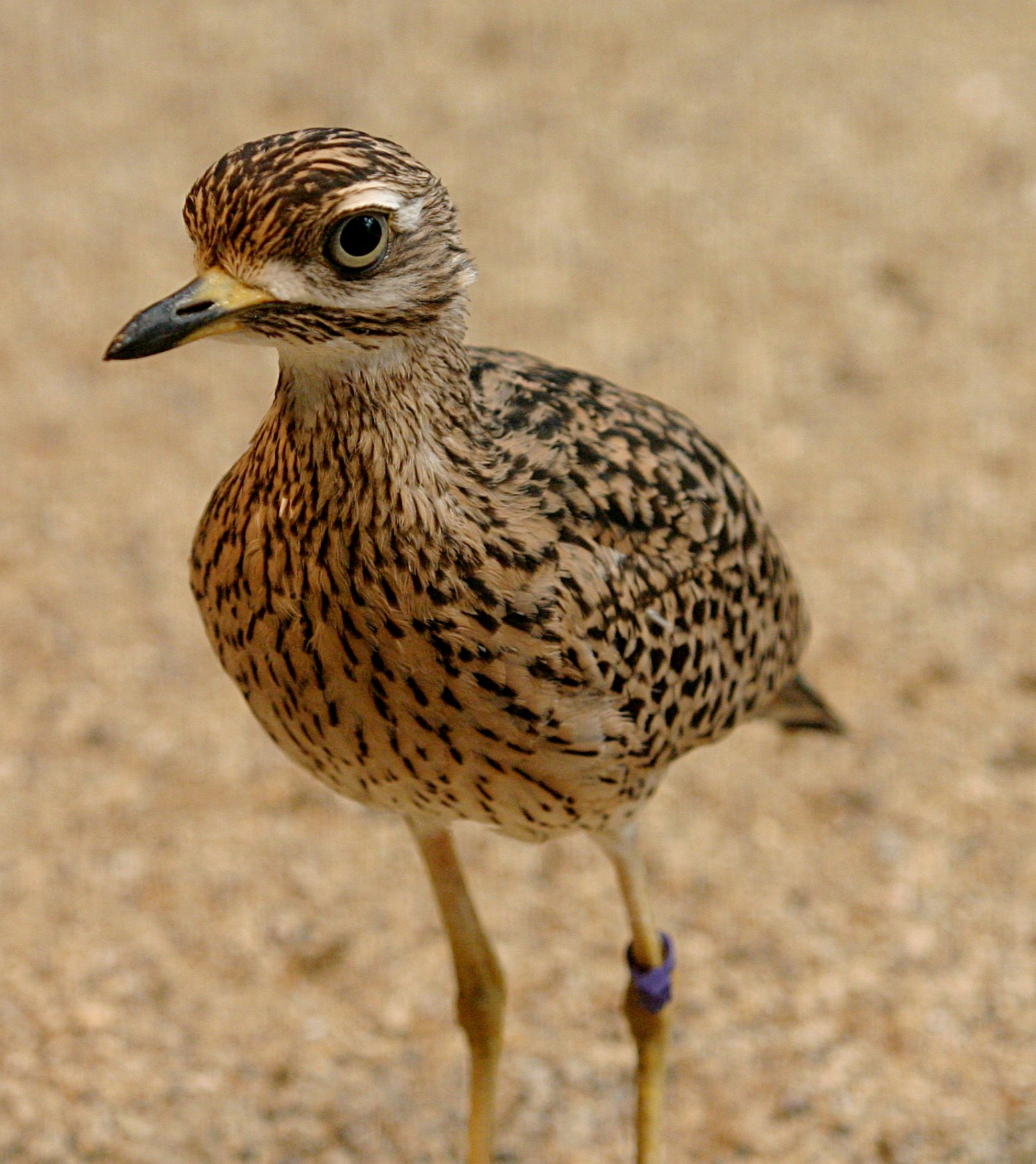
Spotted thick-knee

Order: Charadriiformes Family: Burhinidae

The thick-knees are a group of waders found worldwide within the tropical zone, with some species also breeding in temperate Europe and Australia. They are medium to large waders with strong black or yellow-black bills, large yellow eyes, and cryptic plumage. Despite being classed as waders, most species have a preference for arid or semi-arid habitats.

- Water thick-knee, Burhinus vermiculatus
- Spotted thick-knee, Burhinus capensis

== Stilts and avocets ==
Order: Charadriiformes Family: Recurvirostridae

Recurvirostridae is a family of large wading birds, which includes the avocets and stilts. The avocets have long legs and long up-curved bills. The stilts have extremely long legs and long, thin, straight bills.

- Black-winged stilt, Himantopus himantopus
- Pied avocet, Recurvirostra avosetta

== Plovers and lapwings ==
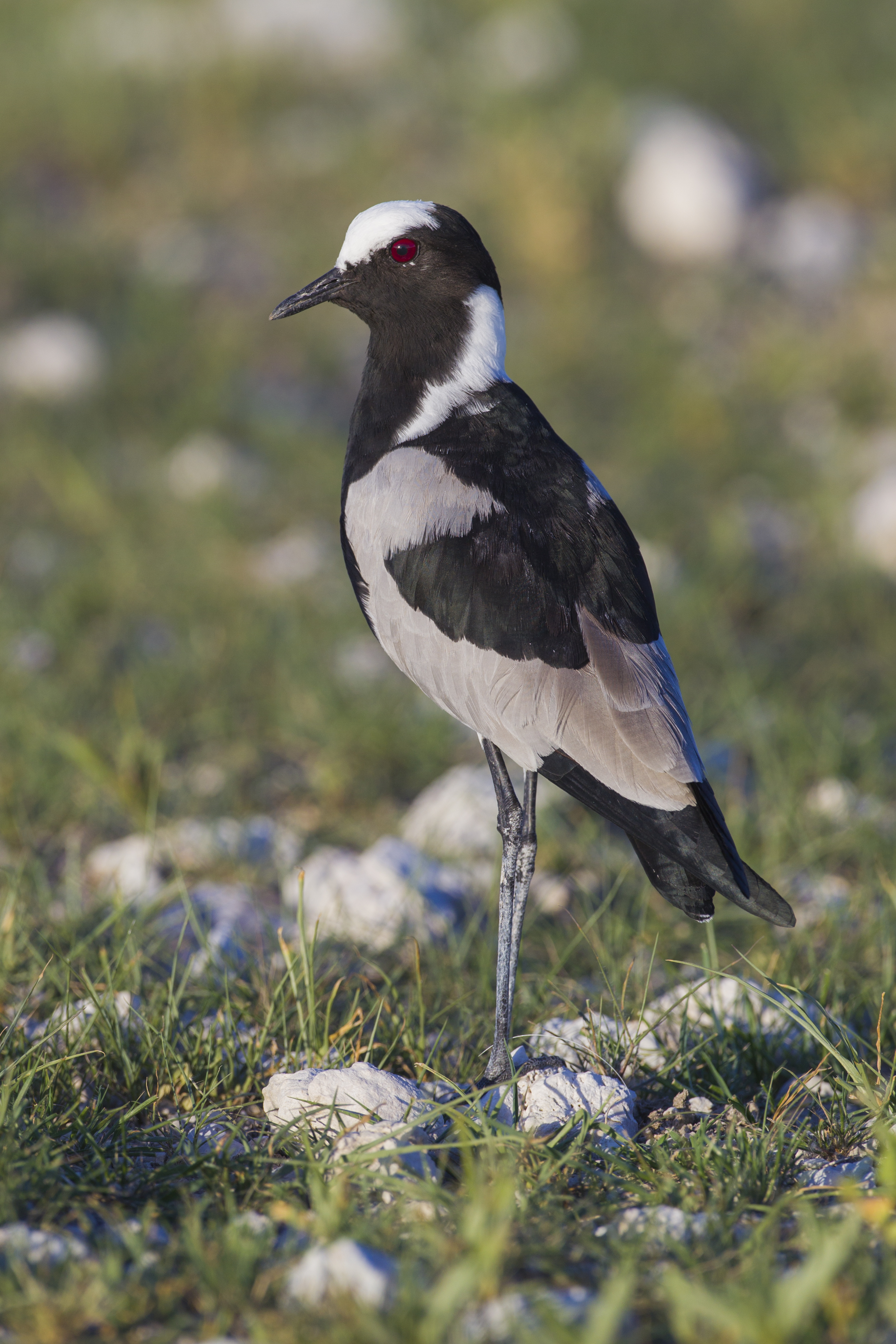
Blacksmith lapwing

Order: Charadriiformes Family: Charadriidae

The family Charadriidae includes the plovers, dotterels, and lapwings. They are small to medium-sized birds with compact bodies, short thick necks, and long, usually pointed, wings. They are found in open country worldwide, mostly in habitats near water.

- Black-bellied plover, Pluvialis squatarola (B)
- Long-toed lapwing, Vanellus crassirostris
- Blacksmith lapwing, Vanellus armatus
- Spur-winged lapwing, Vanellus spinosus (A)
- White-headed lapwing, Vanellus albiceps (B)
- Senegal lapwing, Vanellus lugubris
- Crowned lapwing, Vanellus coronatus
- Wattled lapwing, Vanellus senegallus
- Greater sand-plover, Anarhynchus leschenaultii (A)
- Caspian plover, Anarhynchus asiaticus
- Kittlitz's plover, Anarhynchus pecuarius
- Common ringed plover, Charadrius hiaticula
- Three-banded plover, Charadrius tricollaris
- White-fronted plover, Anarhynchus marginatus (B)
- Chestnut-banded plover, Anarhynchus pallidus (B)

== Painted-snipes ==
Order: Charadriiformes Family: Rostratulidae

Painted-snipe are short-legged, long-billed birds similar in shape to the true snipes, but more brightly coloured.

- Greater painted-snipe, Rostratula benghalensis

== Jacanas ==
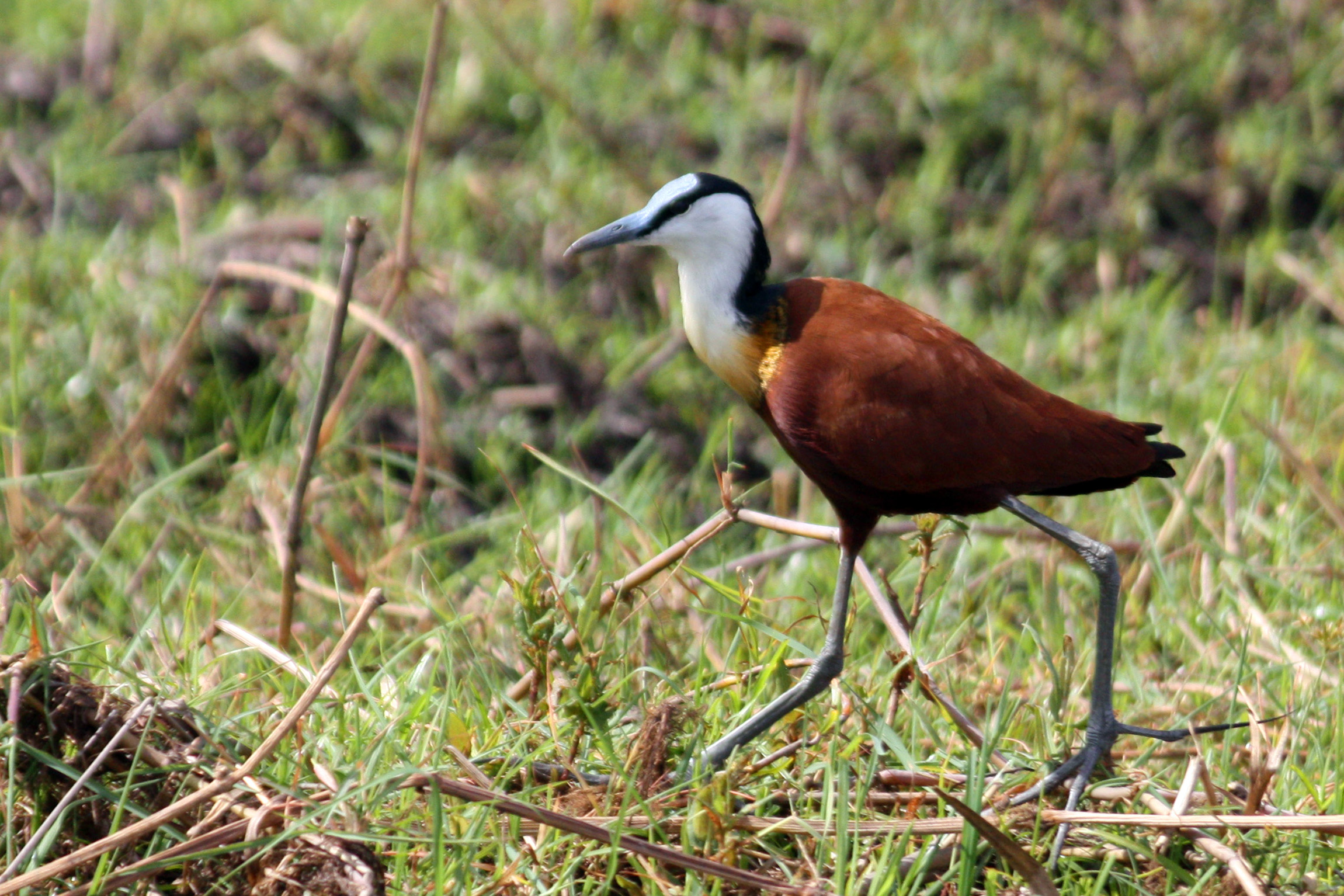
African jacana

Order: Charadriiformes Family: Jacanidae

The jacanas are a group of waders which are found throughout the tropics. They are identifiable by their huge feet and claws which enable them to walk on floating vegetation in the shallow lakes that are their preferred habitat.

- Lesser jacana, Microparra capensis
- African jacana, Actophilornis africanus

== Sandpipers and allies ==
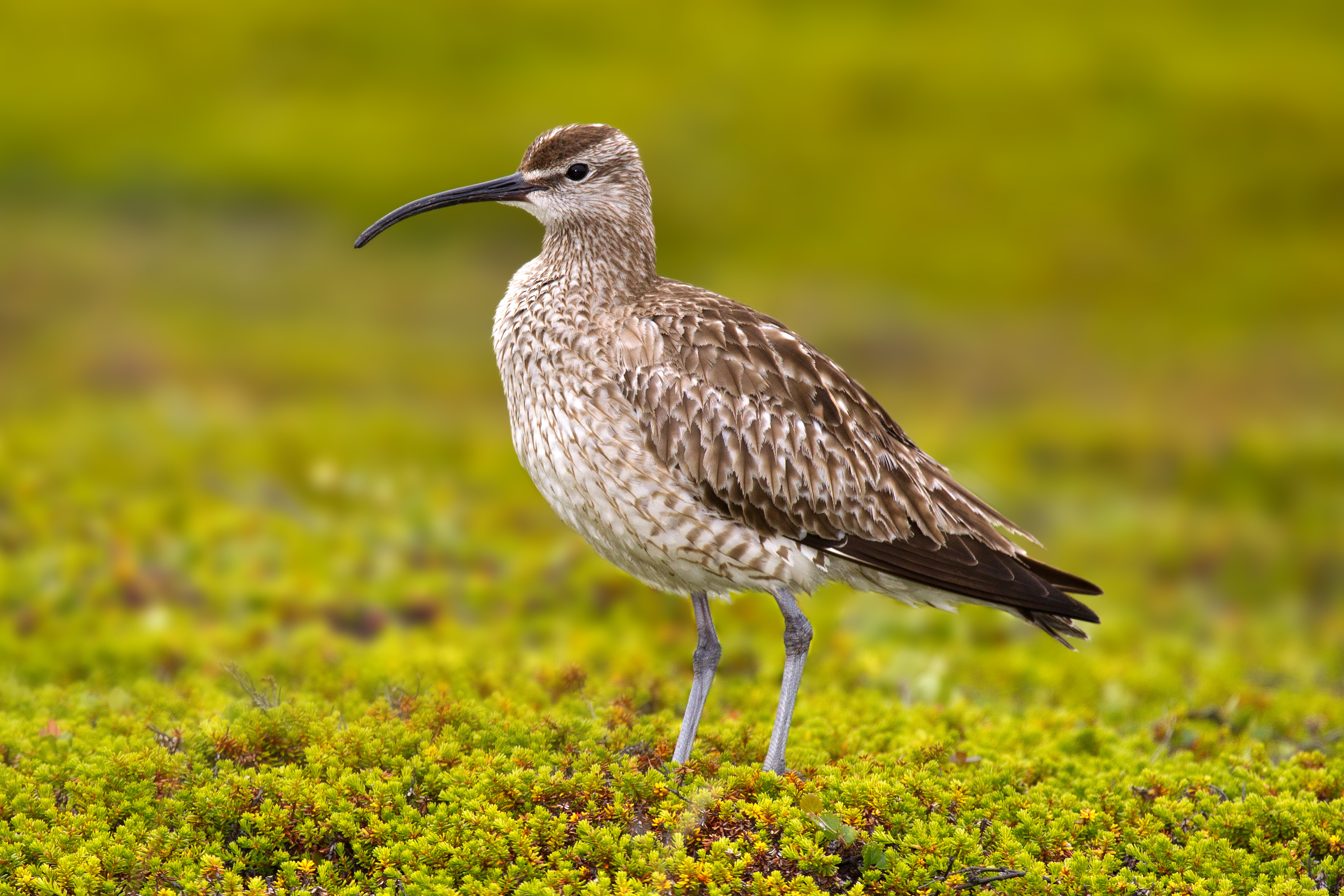
Whimbrel

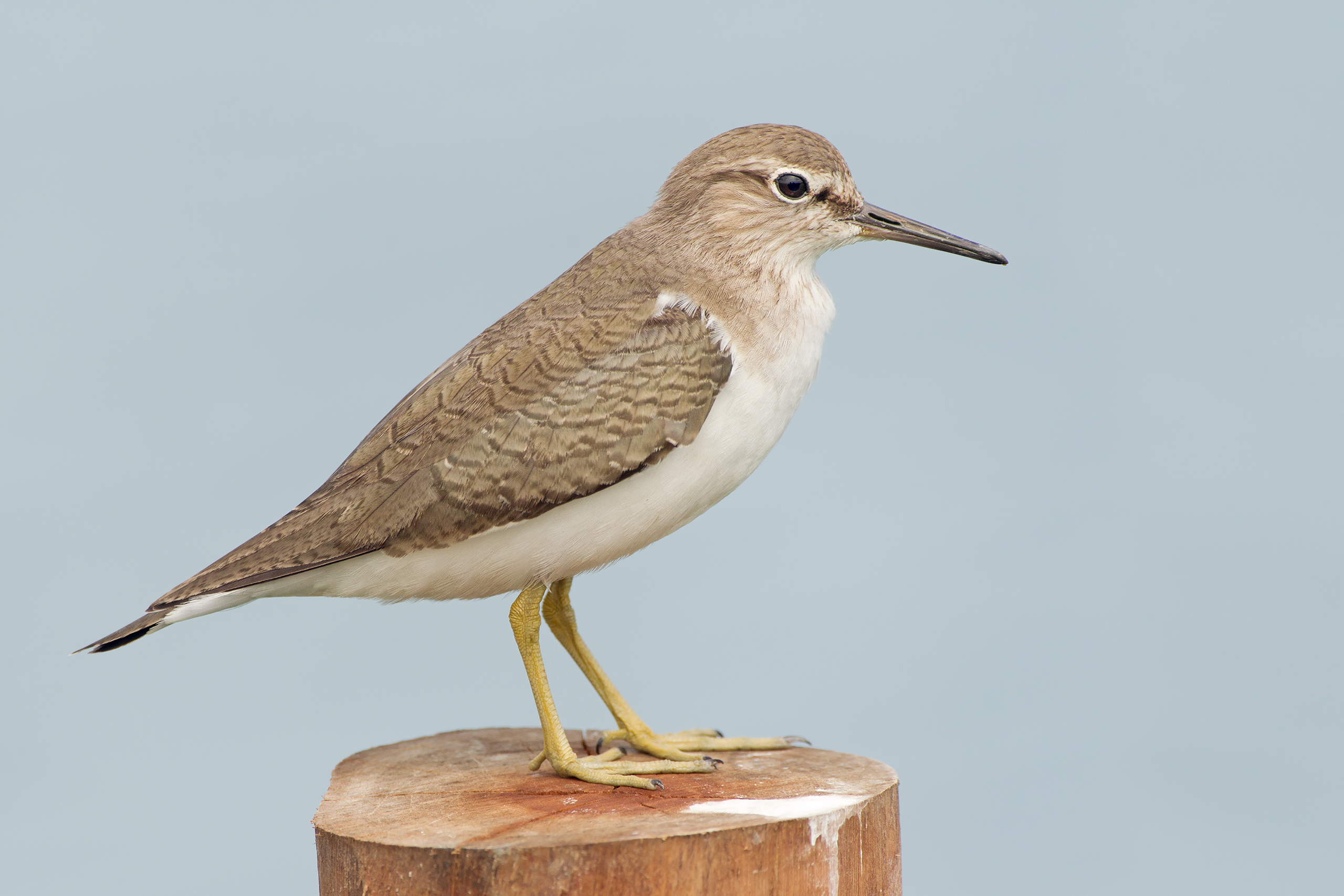
Common sandpiper

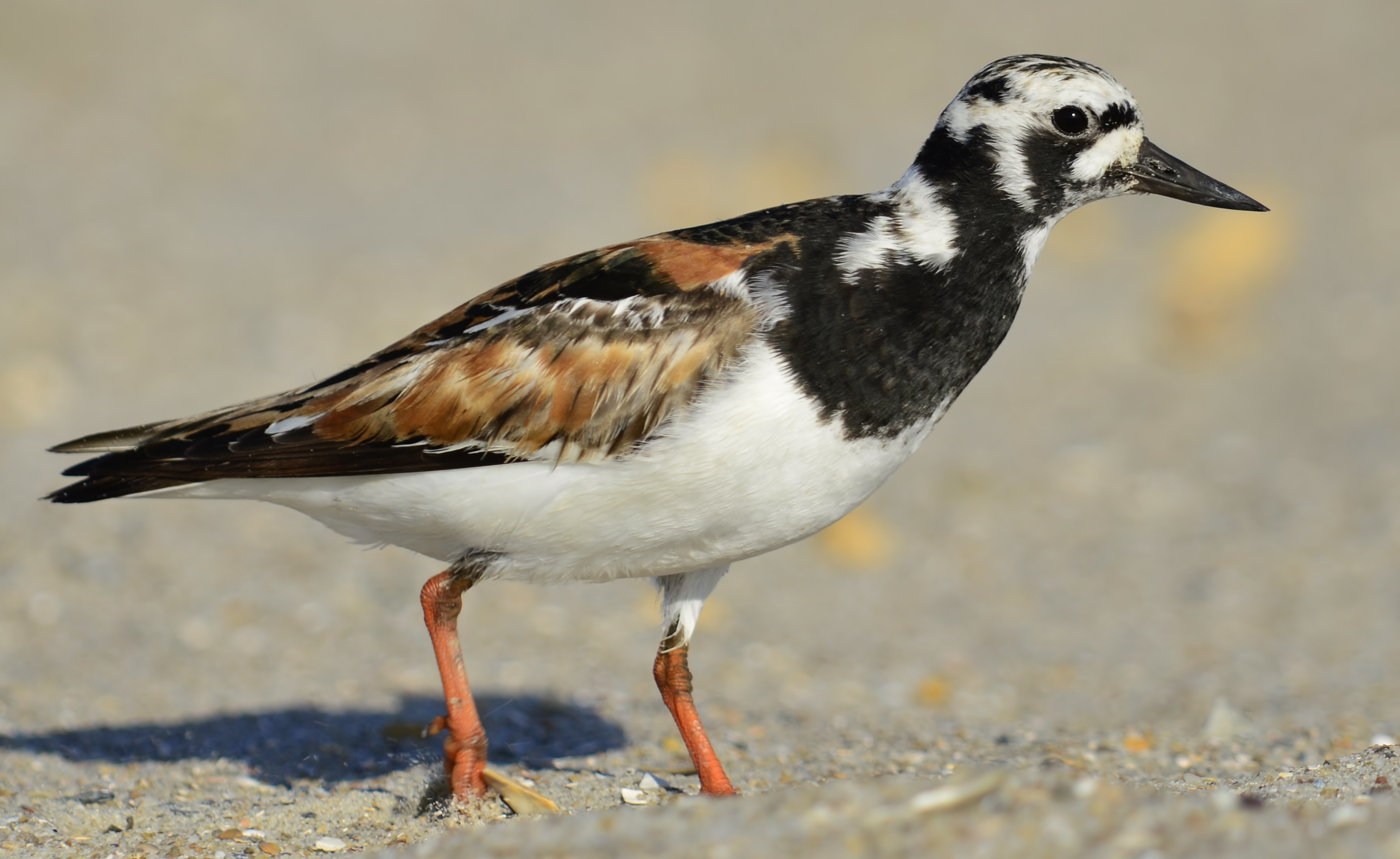
Ruddy turnstone

Order: Charadriiformes Family: Scolopacidae

Scolopacidae is a large diverse family of small to medium-sized shorebirds including the sandpipers, curlews, godwits, shanks, tattlers, woodcocks, snipes, dowitchers, and phalaropes. The majority of these species eat small invertebrates picked out of the mud or soil. Variation in length of legs and bills enables multiple species to feed in the same habitat, particularly on the coast, without direct competition for food.

- Whimbrel, Numenius phaeopus (B)
- Eurasian curlew, Numenius arquata (B)
- Bar-tailed godwit, Limosa lapponica (A)
- Black-tailed godwit, Limosa limosa (B)
- Ruddy turnstone, Arenaria interpres (B)
- Red knot, Calidris canutus (A)
- Ruff, Calidris pugnax
- Curlew sandpiper, Calidris ferruginea (B)
- Temminck's stint, Calidris temminckii (A)
- Long-toed stint, Calidris subminuta (A)
- Sanderling, Calidris alba (B)
- Little stint, Calidris minuta
- Buff-breasted sandpiper, Calidris subruficollis (A)
- Pectoral sandpiper, Calidris melanotos (B)
- Great snipe, Gallinago media (A)
- African snipe, Gallinago nigripennis
- Terek sandpiper, Xenus cinereus (B)
- Red-necked phalarope, Phalaropus lobatus (A)
- Red phalarope, Phalaropus fulicarius (A)
- Common sandpiper, Actitis hypoleucos
- Green sandpiper, Tringa ochropus (B)
- Spotted redshank, Tringa erythropus (A)
- Greater yellowlegs, Tringa melanoleuca (A)
- Common greenshank, Tringa nebularia
- Lesser yellowlegs, Tringa flavipes (A)
- Marsh sandpiper, Tringa stagnatilis
- Wood sandpiper, Tringa glareola
- Common redshank, Tringa totanus (A)

== Buttonquails ==
Order: Charadriiformes Family: Turnicidae

The buttonquails are small, drab, running birds which resemble the true quails. The female is the brighter of the sexes and initiates courtship. The male incubates the eggs and tends the young.

- Small buttonquail, Turnix sylvaticus

== Pratincoles and coursers ==
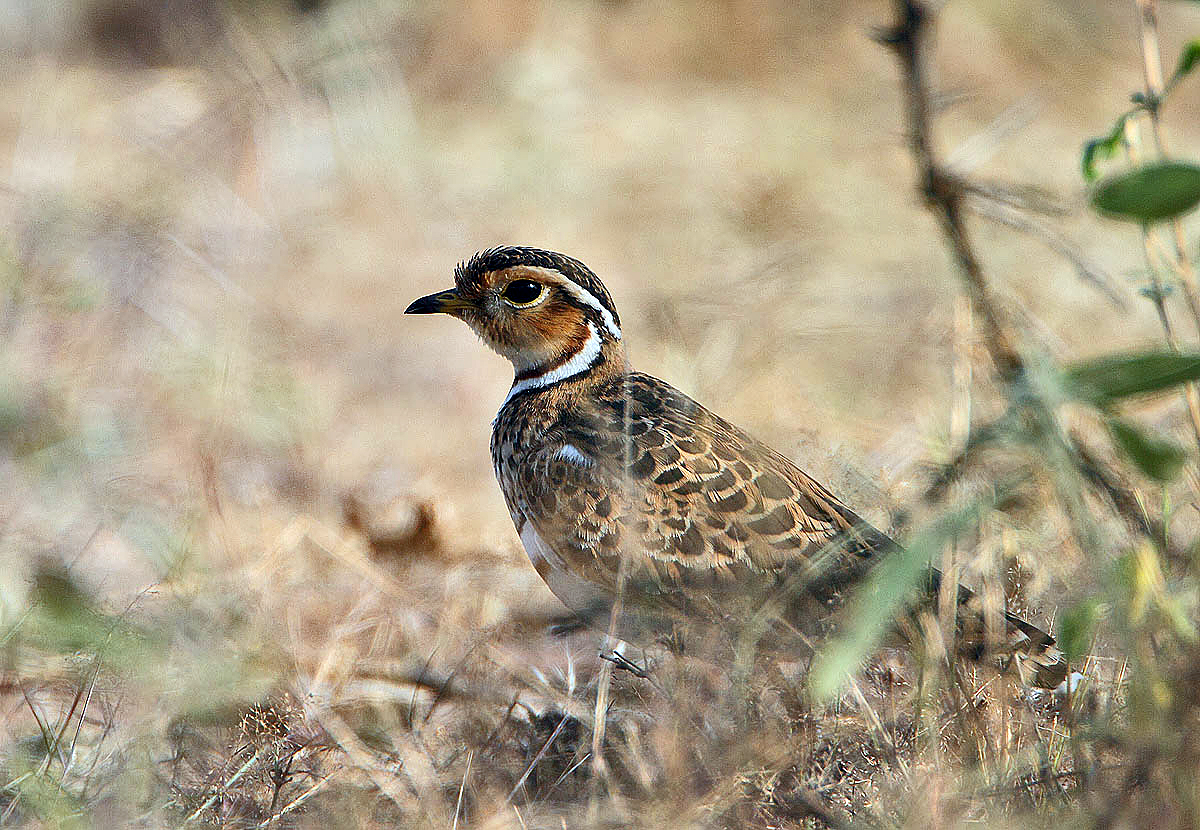
Three-banded courser

Order: Charadriiformes Family: Glareolidae

Glareolidae is a family of wading birds comprising the pratincoles, which have short legs, long pointed wings, and long forked tails, and the coursers, which have long legs, short wings, and long, pointed bills which curve downwards.

- Burchell's courser, Cursorius rufus (A)
- Temminck's courser, Cursorius temminckii
- Double-banded courser, Rhinoptilus africanus
- Three-banded courser, Rhinoptilus cinctus (B)
- Bronze-winged courser, Rhinoptilus chalcopterus
- Collared pratincole, Glareola pratincola
- Black-winged pratincole, Glareola nordmanni (B)
- Rock pratincole, Glareola nuchalis (A)

== Skuas and jaegers ==
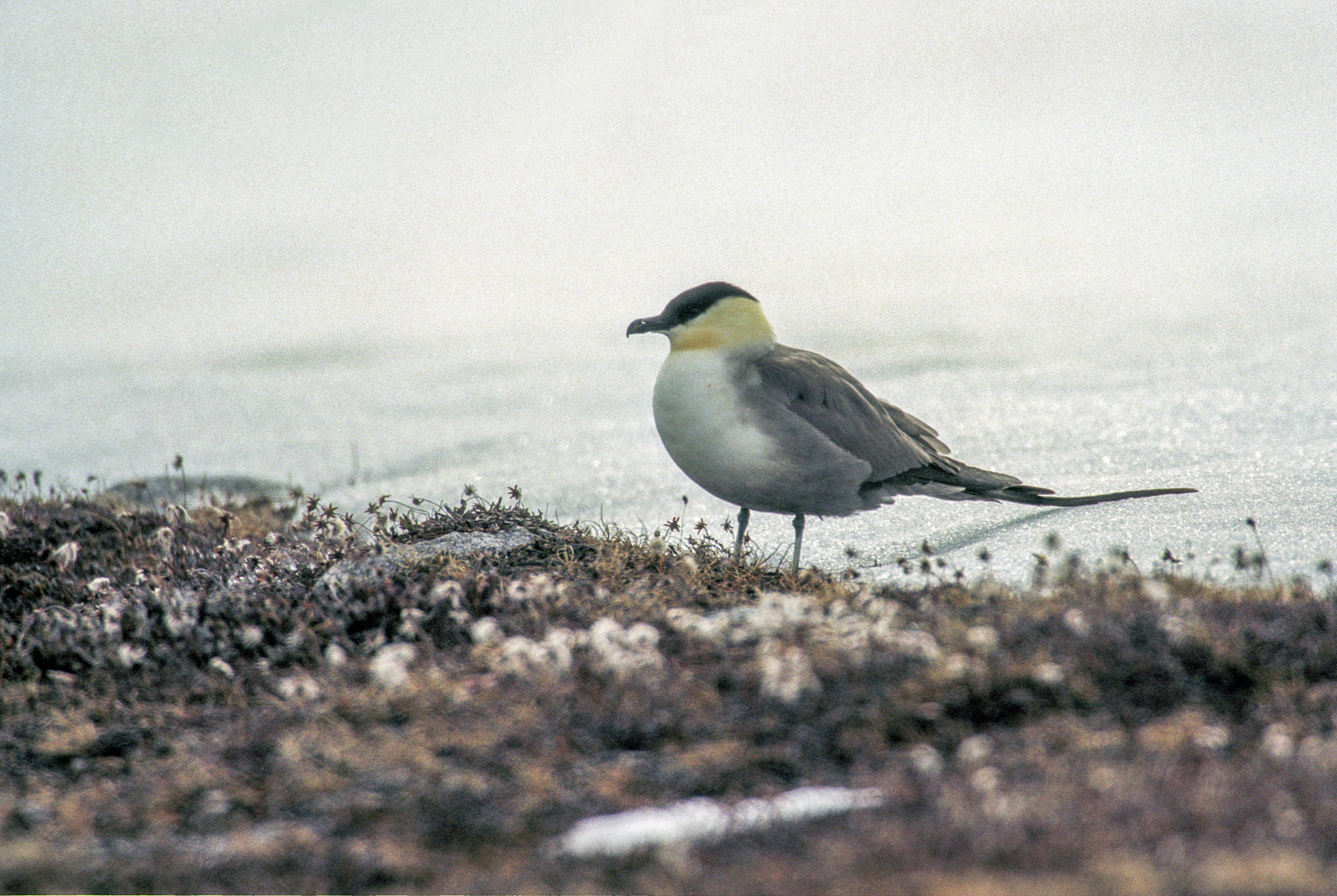
Long-tailed jaeger

Order: Charadriiformes Family: Stercorariidae

The family Stercorariidae are, in general, medium to large birds, typically with grey or brown plumage, often with white markings on the wings. They nest on the ground in temperate and arctic regions and are long-distance migrants.

- Long-tailed jaeger, Stercorarius longicaudus (A)

== Gulls, terns, and skimmers ==
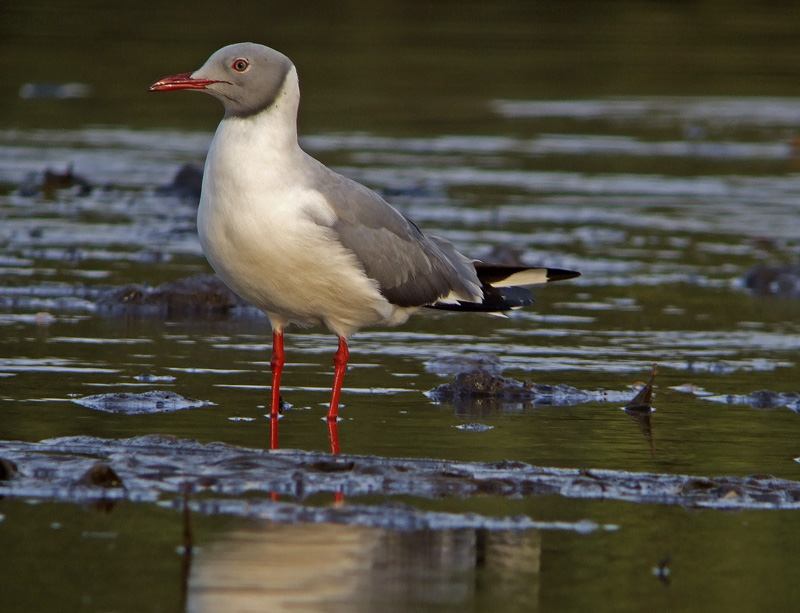
Gray-hooded gull

Order: Charadriiformes Family: Laridae

Laridae is a family of medium to large seabirds, the gulls, terns, and skimmers. Gulls are typically grey or white, often with black markings on the head or wings. They have stout, longish bills and webbed feet. Terns are a group of generally medium to large seabirds typically with grey or white plumage, often with black markings on the head. Most terns hunt fish by diving but some pick insects off the surface of fresh water. Terns are generally long-lived birds, with several species known to live in excess of 30 years. Skimmers are a small family of tropical tern-like birds. They have an elongated lower mandible which they use to feed by flying low over the water surface and skimming the water for small fish.

- Gray-hooded gull, Chroicocephalus cirrocephalus
- Black-headed gull, Chroicocephalus ridibundus (A)
- Lesser black-backed gull, Larus fuscus (B)
- Gull-billed tern, Gelochelidon nilotica (A)
- Caspian tern, Hydroprogne caspia (B)
- Black tern, Chlidonias niger
- White-winged tern, Chlidonias leucopterus
- Whiskered tern, Chlidonias hybrida
- African skimmer, Rynchops flavirostris (B)

== Storks ==
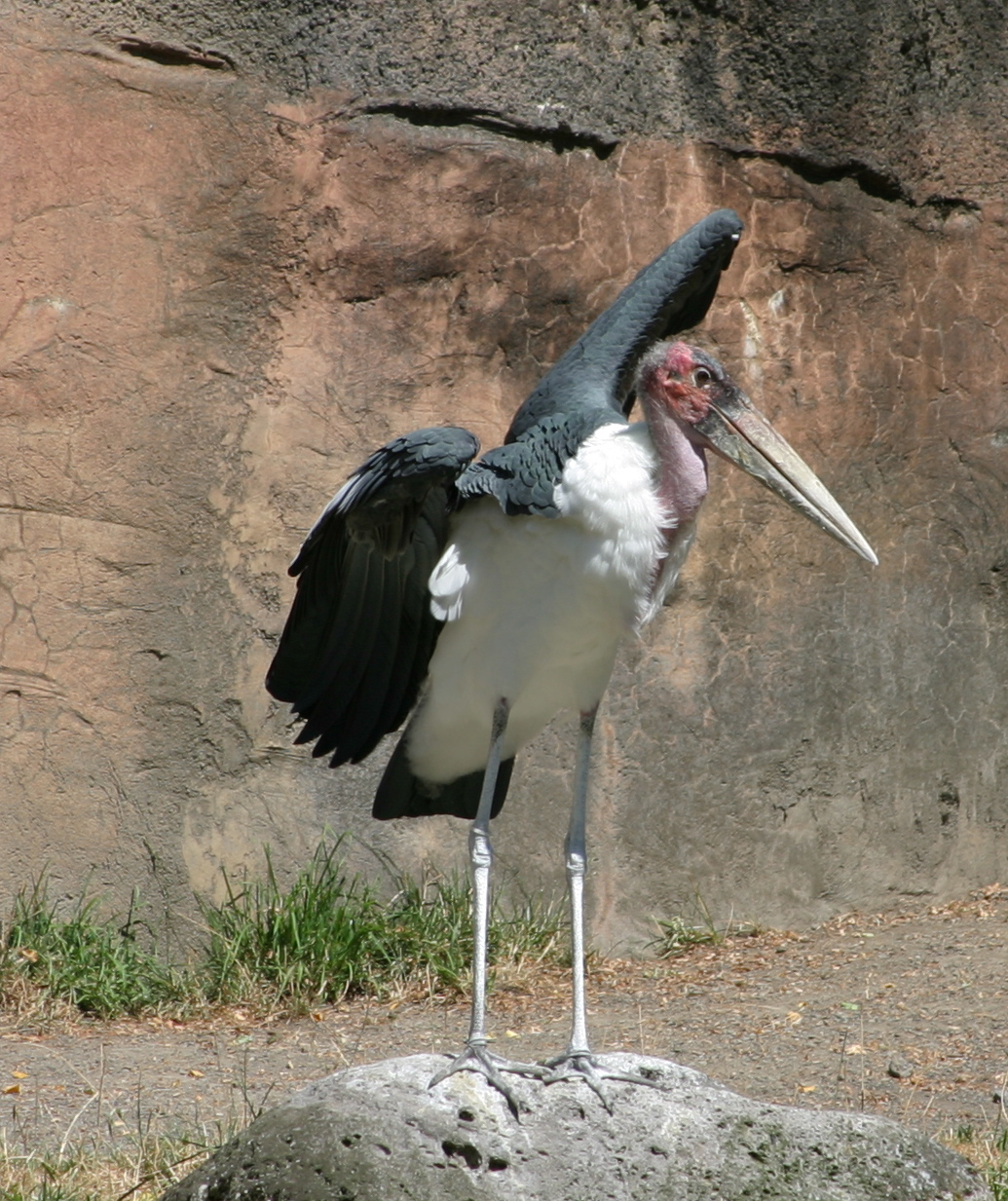
Marabou stork

Order: Ciconiiformes Family: Ciconiidae

Storks are large, long-legged, long-necked, wading birds with long, stout bills. Storks are mute, but bill-clattering is an important mode of communication at the nest. Their nests can be large and may be reused for many years. Many species are migratory.

- African openbill, Anastomus lamelligerus
- Black stork, Ciconia nigra (B)
- Abdim's stork, Ciconia abdimii
- African woolly-necked stork, Ciconia microscelis (B)
- White stork, Ciconia ciconia
- Saddle-billed stork, Ephippiorhynchus senegalensis (B)
- Marabou stork, Leptoptilos crumenifer
- Yellow-billed stork, Mycteria ibis

== Anhingas ==
Order: Suliformes Family: Anhingidae

Anhingas or darters are often called "snake-birds" because of their long thin neck, which gives a snake-like appearance when they swim with their bodies submerged. The males have black and dark-brown plumage, an erectile crest on the nape and a larger bill than the female. The females have much paler plumage especially on the neck and underparts. The darters have completely webbed feet and their legs are short and set far back on the body. Their plumage is somewhat permeable, like that of cormorants, and they spread their wings to dry after diving.

- African darter, Anhinga rufa

== Cormorants and shags ==
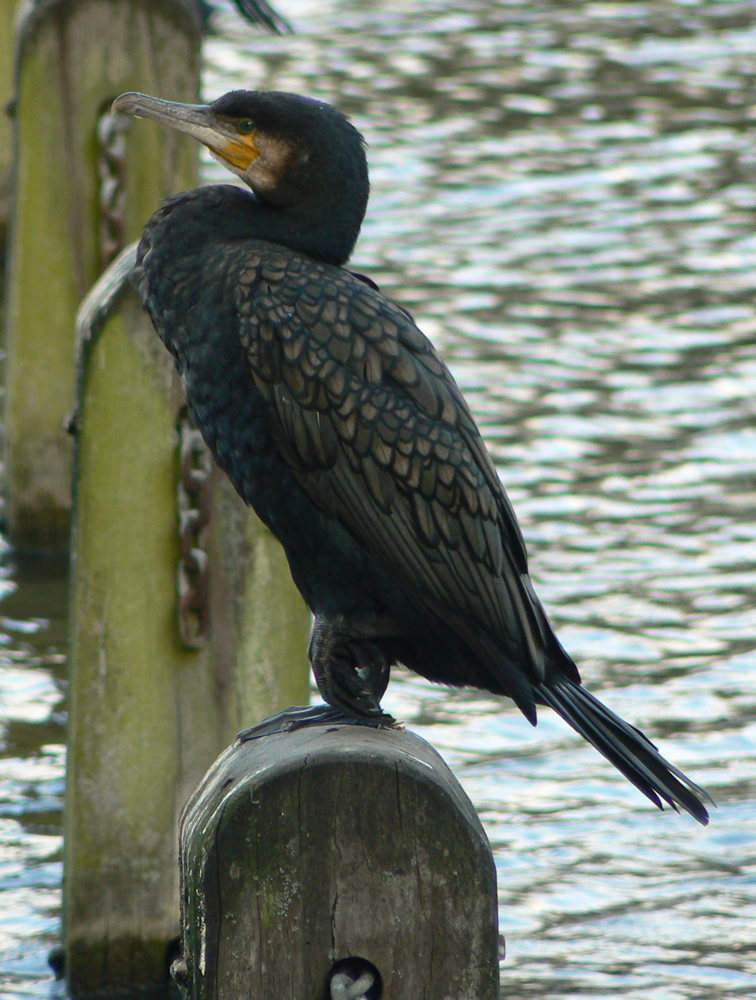
Great cormorant

Order: Suliformes Family: Phalacrocoracidae

Phalacrocoracidae is a family of medium to large coastal, fish-eating seabirds that includes cormorants and shags. Plumage colouration varies, with the majority having mainly dark plumage, some species being black-and-white, and a few being colourful.

- Long-tailed cormorant, Microcarbo africanus
- Great cormorant, Phalacrocorax carbo

== Pelicans ==
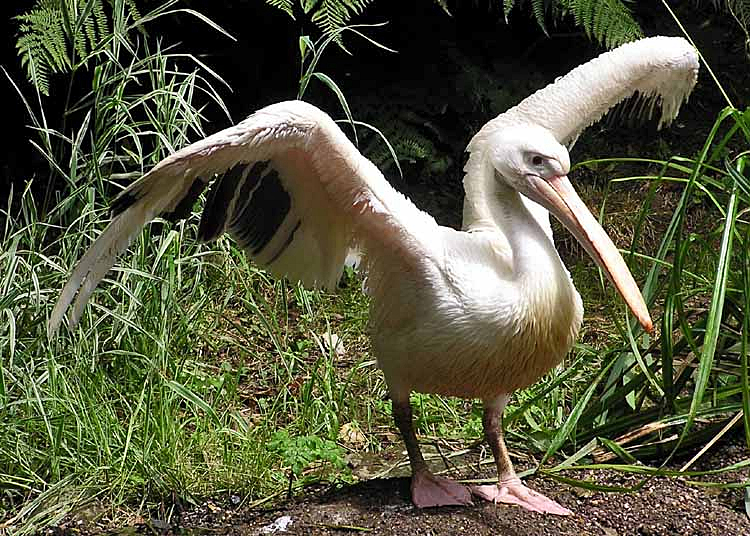
Great white pelican

Order: Pelecaniformes Family: Pelecanidae

Pelicans are large water birds with a distinctive pouch under their beak. They have webbed feet with four toes.

- Great white pelican, Pelecanus onocrotalus
- Pink-backed pelican, Pelecanus rufescens

== Hamerkop ==
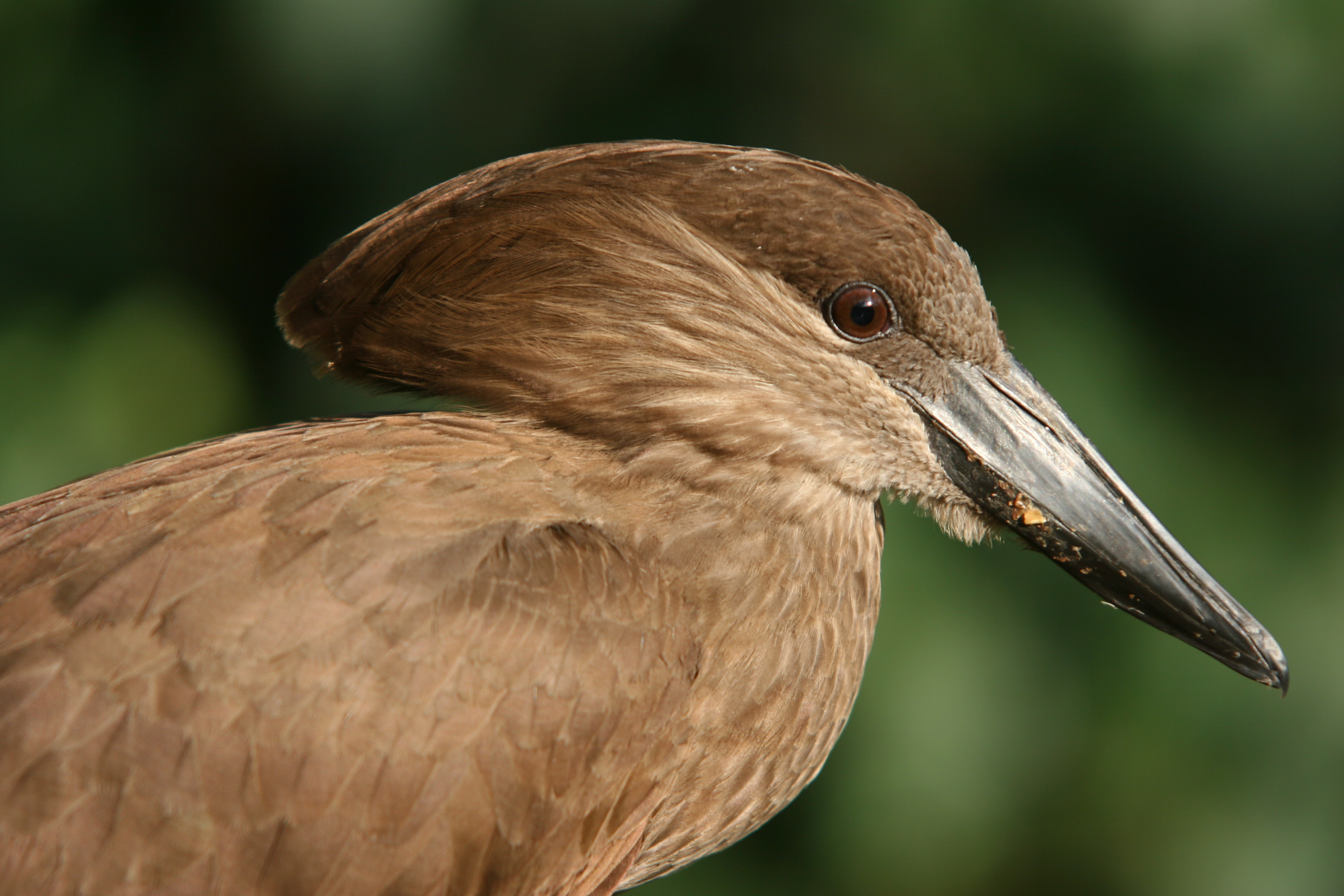
Hamerkop

Order: Pelecaniformes Family: Scopidae

The hamerkop is a medium-sized bird with a long shaggy crest. The shape of its head with a curved bill and crest at the back is reminiscent of a hammer, hence its name. Its plumage is drab-brown all over.

- Hamerkop, Scopus umbretta

== Herons, egrets, and bitterns ==
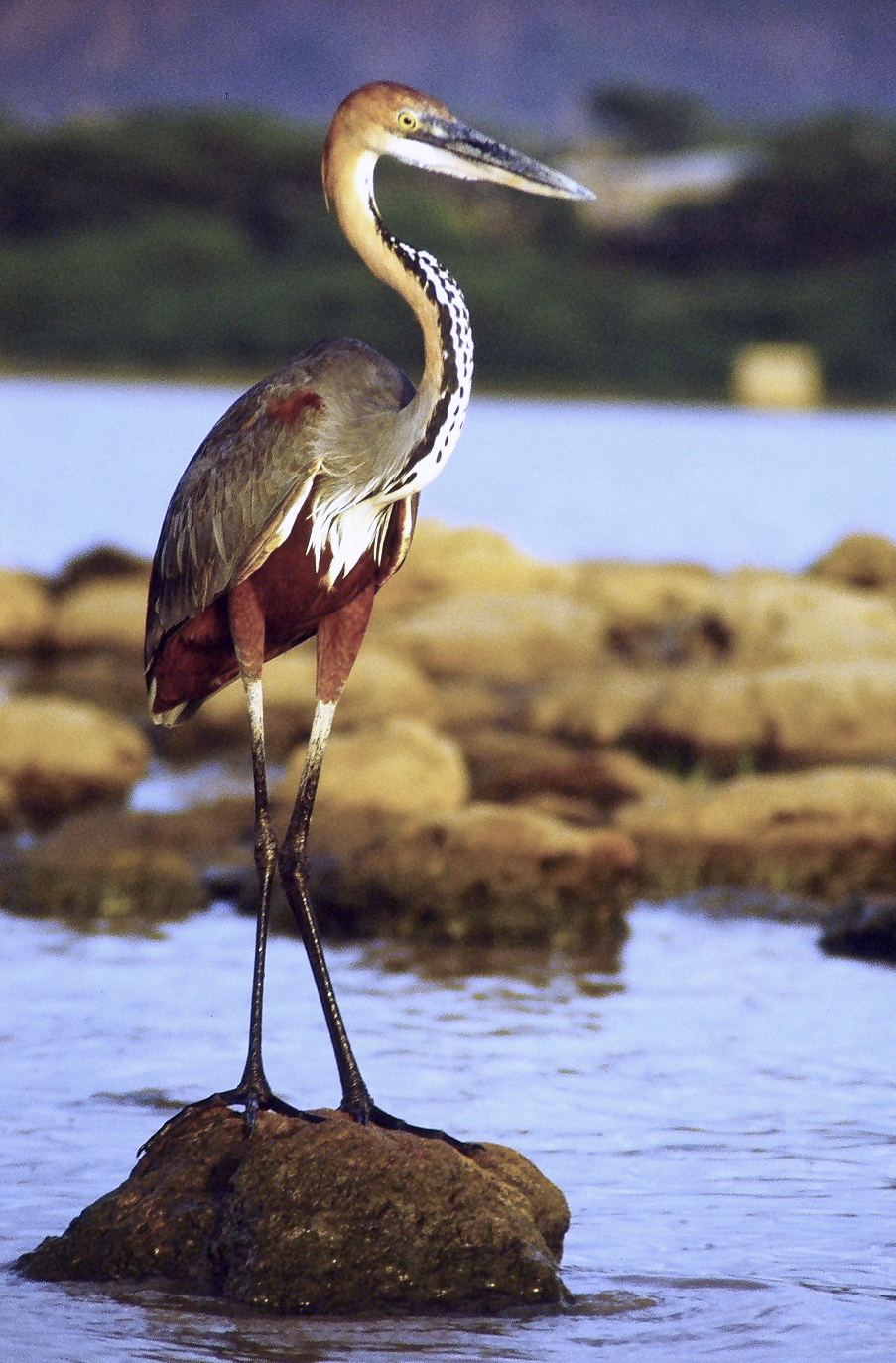
Goliath heron

Order: Pelecaniformes Family: Ardeidae

The family Ardeidae contains the bitterns, herons, and egrets. Herons and egrets are medium to large wading birds with long necks and legs. Bitterns tend to be shorter necked and more wary. Members of Ardeidae fly with their necks retracted, unlike other long-necked birds such as storks, ibises, and spoonbills.

- Great bittern, Botaurus stellaris
- Little bittern, Botaurus minutus
- Dwarf bittern, Botaurus sturmii
- Gray heron, Ardea cinerea
- Black-headed heron, Ardea melanocephala
- Goliath heron, Ardea goliath
- Purple heron, Ardea purpurea
- Great egret, Ardea alba
- Intermediate egret, Ardea intermedia (B)
- Little egret, Egretta garzetta
- Slaty egret, Egretta vinaceigula (B)
- Black heron, Egretta ardesiaca
- Western cattle egret, Ardea ibis
- Squacco heron, Ardeola ralloides
- Rufous-bellied heron, Ardeola rufiventris
- Striated heron, Butorides striata
- Black-crowned night-heron, Nycticorax nycticorax
- White-backed night-heron, Calherodius leuconotus (B)

== Ibises and spoonbills ==
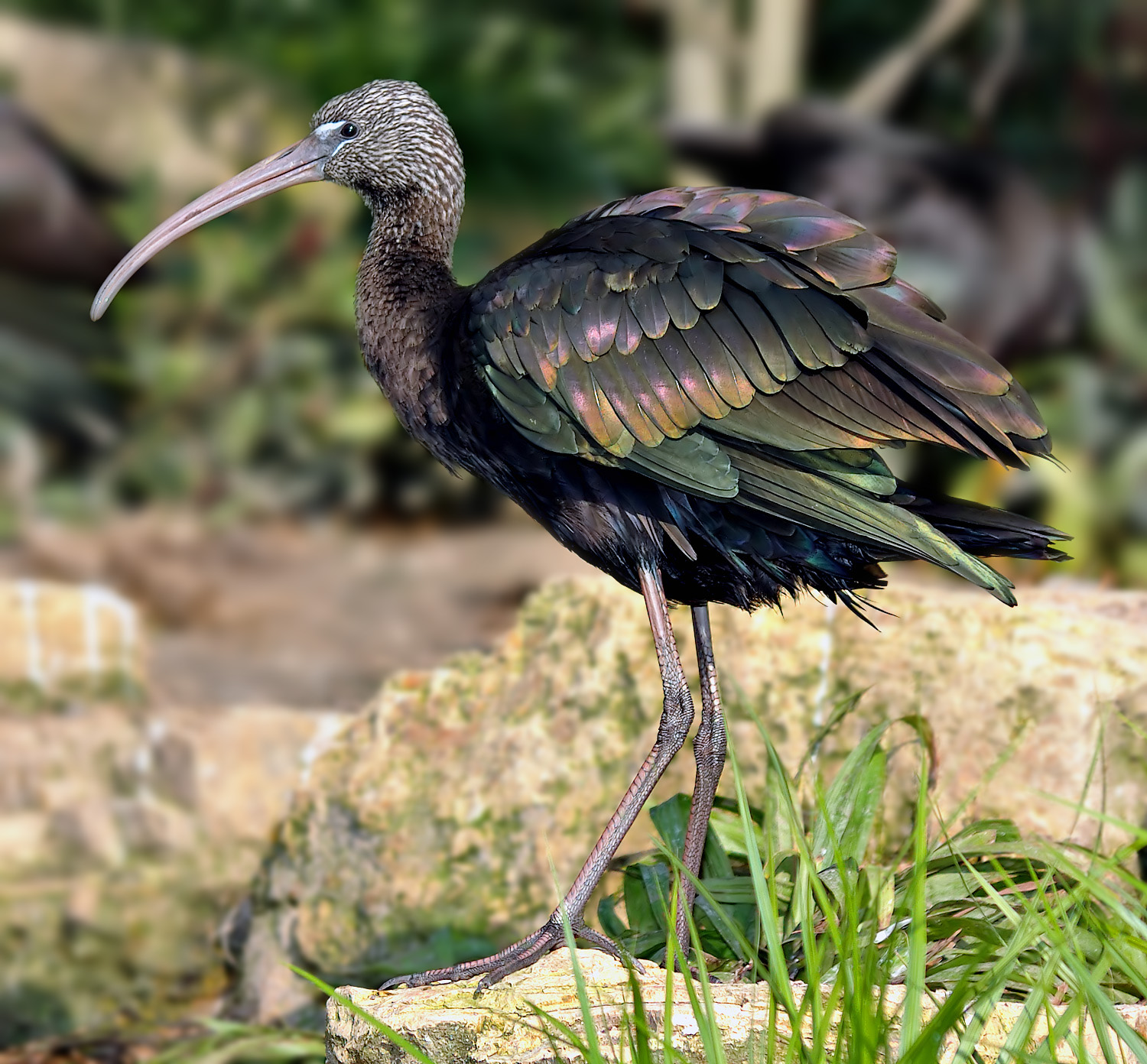
Glossy ibis

Order: Pelecaniformes Family: Threskiornithidae

Threskiornithidae is a family of large terrestrial and wading birds which includes the ibises and spoonbills. They have long, broad wings with 11 primary and about 20 secondary feathers. They are strong fliers and despite their size and weight, very capable soarers.

- Glossy ibis, Plegadis falcinellus
- African sacred ibis, Threskiornis aethiopicus
- Southern bald ibis, Geronticus calvus (A)
- Hadada ibis, Bostrychia hagedash
- African spoonbill, Platalea alba

== Secretarybird ==
Order: Accipitriformes Family: Sagittariidae

The secretarybird is a bird of prey but is easily distinguished from other raptors by its long crane-like legs.

- Secretarybird, Sagittarius serpentarius (B)

== Osprey ==
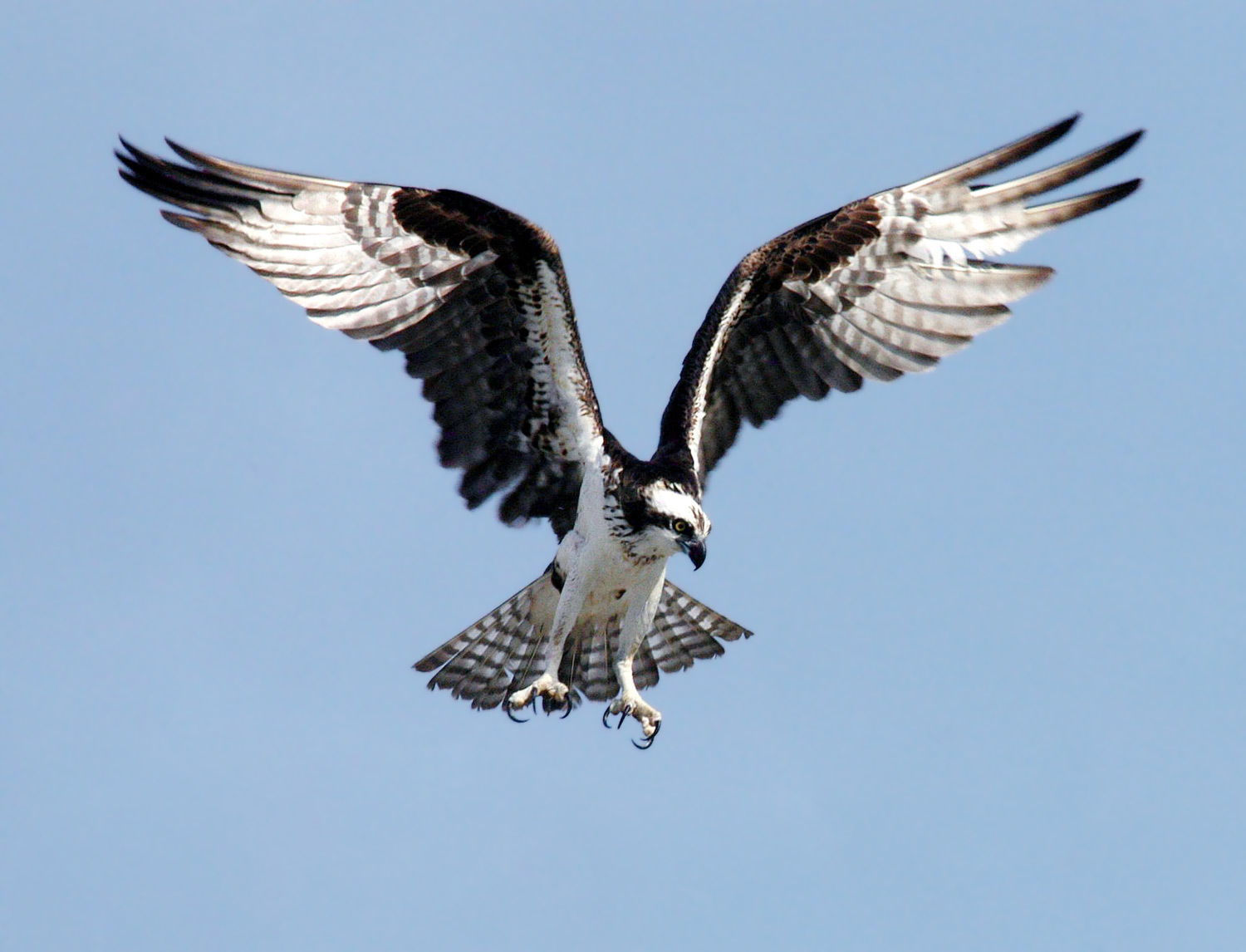
Osprey

Order: Accipitriformes Family: Pandionidae

The family Pandionidae contains only one species, the osprey. The osprey is a medium-large raptor which is a specialist fish-eater with a worldwide distribution.

- Osprey, Pandion haliaetus (B)

== Hawks, eagles, and kites ==
Order: Accipitriformes Family: Accipitridae

Accipitridae is a family of birds of prey which includes hawks, eagles, kites, harriers, and Old World vultures. These birds have powerful hooked beaks for tearing flesh from their prey, strong legs, powerful talons, and keen eyesight.

- Black-winged kite, Elanus caeruleus
- African harrier-hawk, Polyboroides typus
- Palm-nut vulture, Gypohierax angolensis (A)
- Egyptian vulture, Neophron percnopterus (A)
- European honey-buzzard, Pernis apivorus (B)
- African cuckoo-hawk, Aviceda cuculoides (A)
- White-headed vulture, Trigonoceps occipitalis (B)
- Lappet-faced vulture, Torgos tracheliotos (B)
- Hooded vulture, Necrosyrtes monachus (B)
- White-backed vulture, Gyps africanus (B)
- Cape griffon, Gyps coprotheres (B)
- Bateleur, Terathopius ecaudatus (B)
- Black-chested snake-eagle, Circaetus pectoralis
- Brown snake-eagle, Circaetus cinereus
- Banded snake-eagle, Circaetus cinerascens
- Bat hawk, Macheiramphus alcinus (B)
- Crowned eagle, Stephanoaetus coronatus (A)
- Martial eagle, Polemaetus bellicosus (B)
- Long-crested eagle, Lophaetus occipitalis (B)
- Lesser spotted eagle, Clanga pomarina (B)
- Wahlberg's eagle, Hieraaetus wahlbergi
- Booted eagle, Hieraaetus pennatus (B)
- Ayres's hawk-eagle, Hieraaetus ayresii (B)
- Tawny eagle, Aquila rapax
- Steppe eagle, Aquila nipalensis (B)
- Verreaux's eagle, Aquila verreauxii
- African hawk-eagle, Aquila spilogaster
- Lizard buzzard, Kaupifalco monogrammicus (B)
- Dark chanting-goshawk, Melierax metabates
- Pale chanting-goshawk, Melierax canorus
- Gabar goshawk, Micronisus gabar
- Eurasian marsh-harrier, Circus aeruginosus (B)
- African marsh-harrier, Circus ranivorus (B)
- Black harrier, Circus maurus (A)
- Pallid harrier, Circus macrourus (B)
- Montagu's harrier, Circus pygargus
- African goshawk, Aerospiza tachiro (A)
- Shikra, Tachyspiza badia
- Little sparrowhawk, Tachyspiza minulla
- Ovambo sparrowhawk, Accipiter ovampensis
- Black goshawk, Astur melanoleucus (B)
- Black kite, Milvus migrans
- African fish-eagle, Icthyophaga vocifer
- Common buzzard, Buteo buteo
- Long-legged buzzard, Buteo rufinus (A)
- Red-necked buzzard, Buteo auguralis (A)
- Augur buzzard, Buteo augur (A)
- Jackal buzzard, Buteo rufofuscus (B)
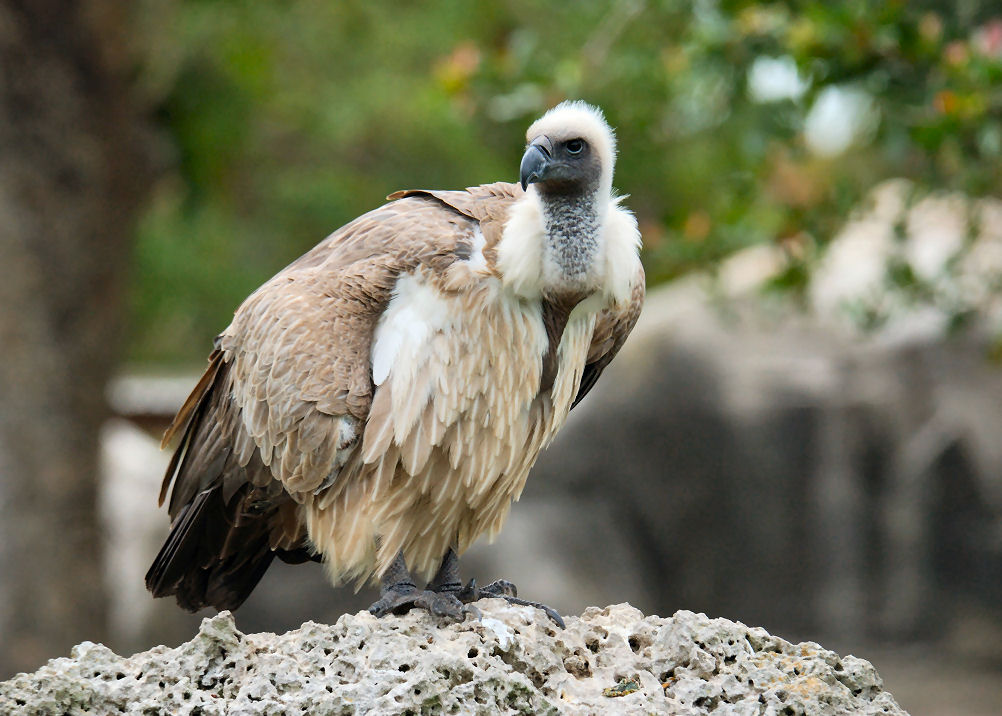
White-backed vulture

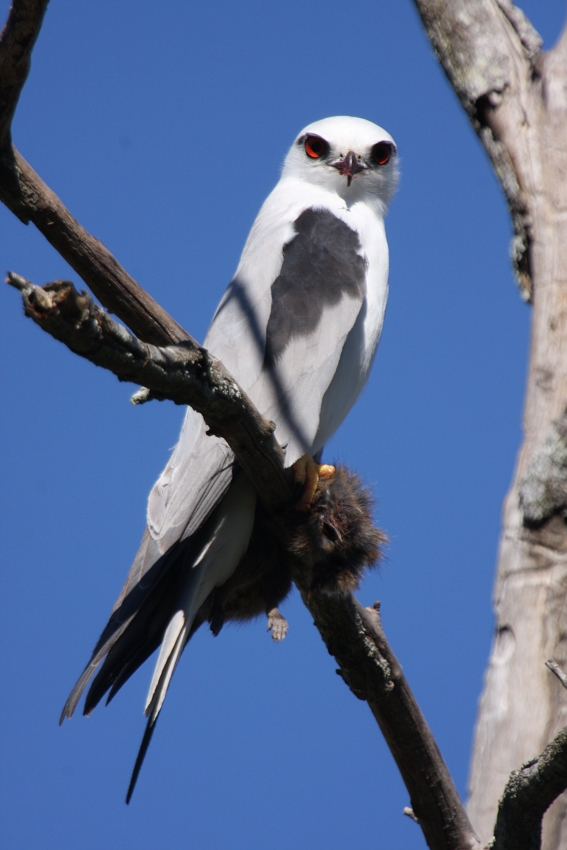
Black-winged kite

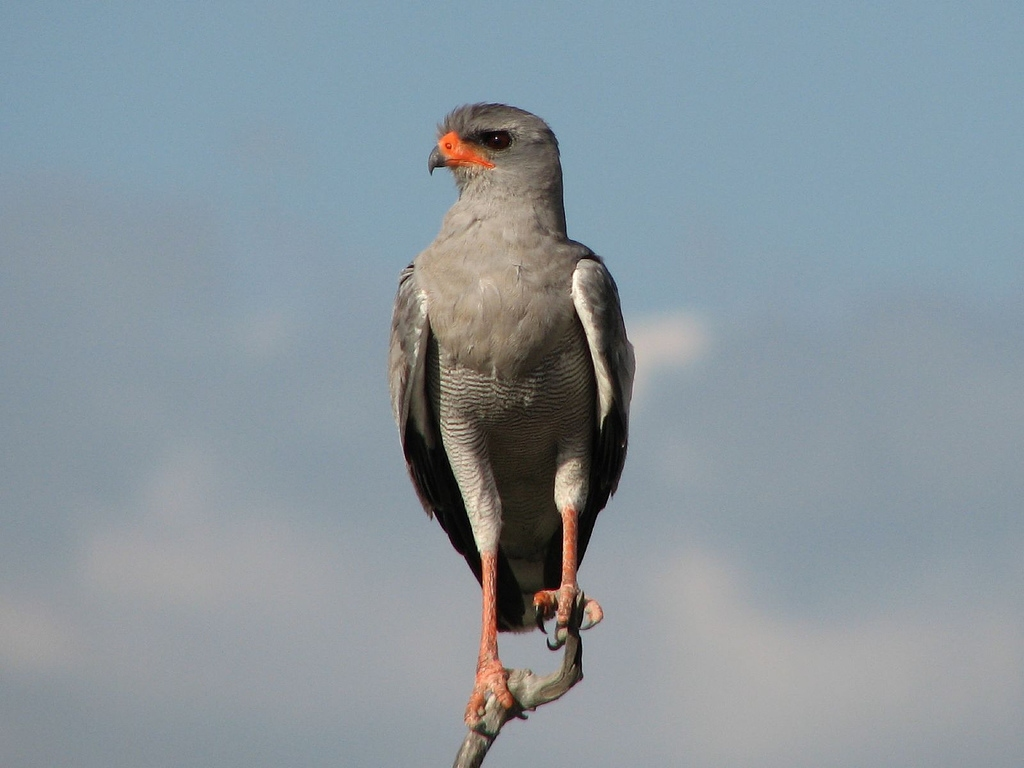
Pale chanting-goshawk

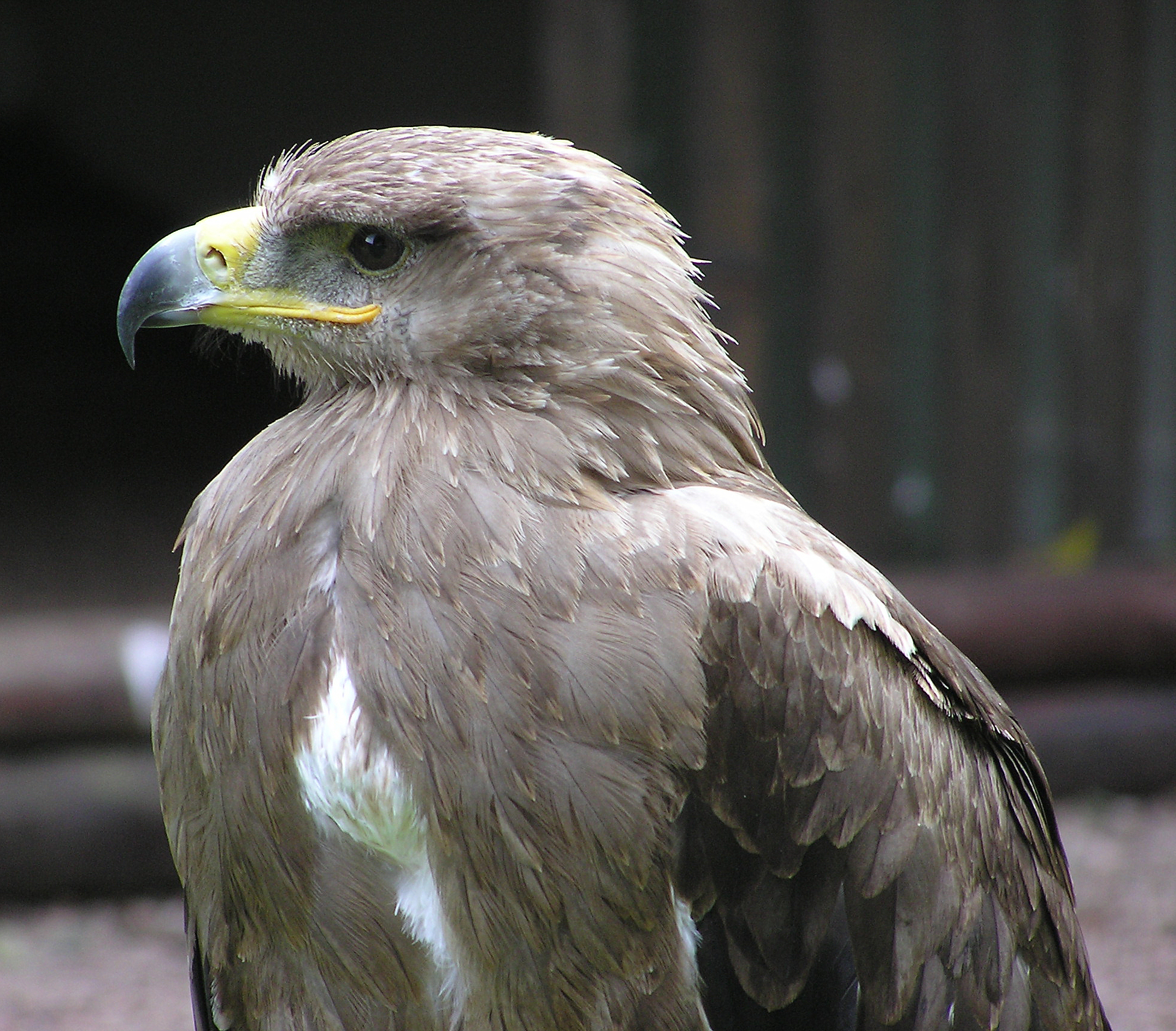
Tawny eagle

== Barn-owls ==
Order: Strigiformes Family: Tytonidae

Barn-owls are medium to large owls with large heads and characteristic heart-shaped faces. They have long strong legs with powerful talons.

- African grass-owl, Tyto capensis (A)
- Western barn owl, Tyto alba

== Owls ==
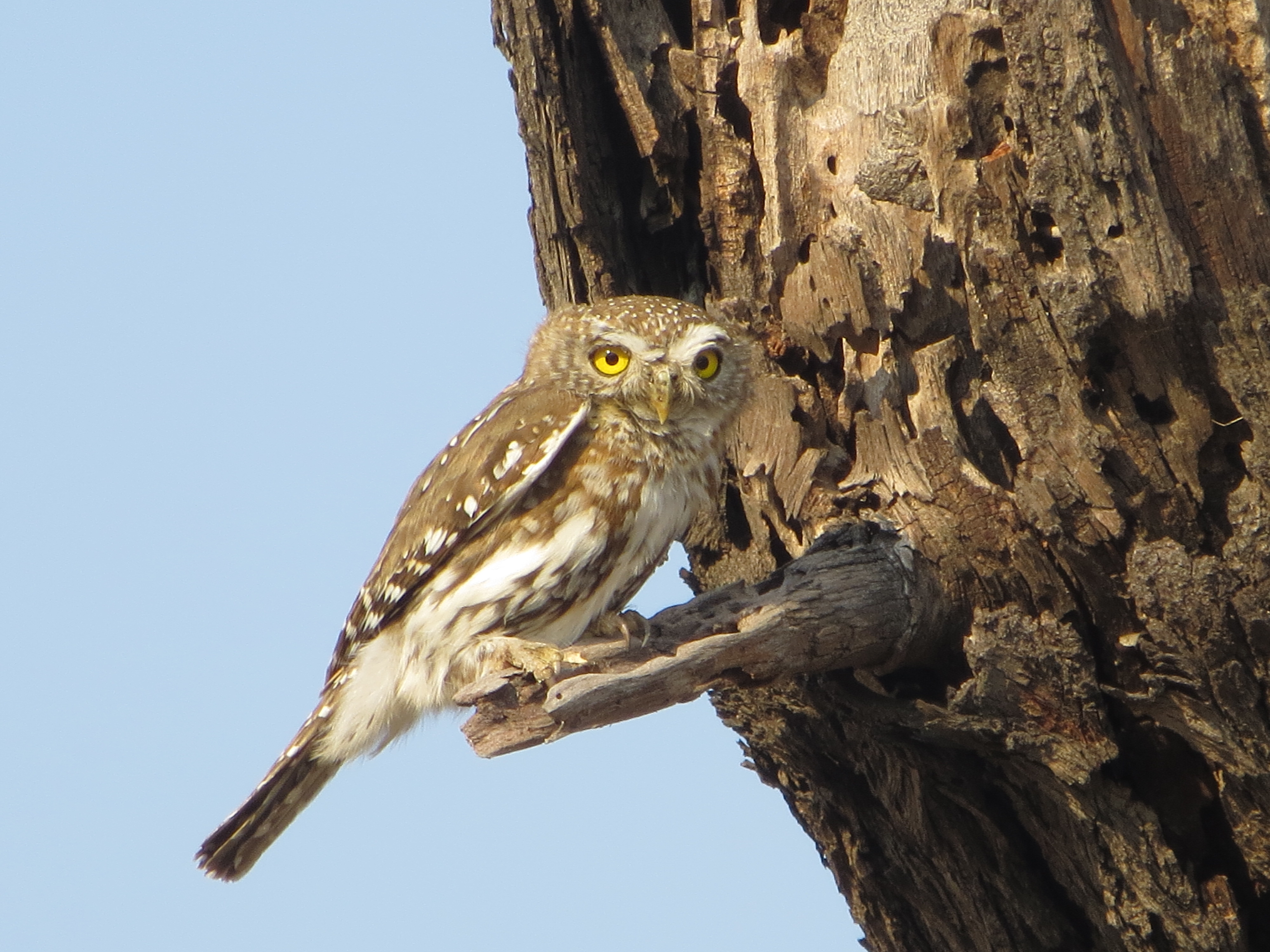
Pearl-spotted owlet

Order: Strigiformes Family: Strigidae

The typical owls are small to large solitary nocturnal birds of prey. They have large forward-facing eyes and ears, a hawk-like beak, and a conspicuous circle of feathers around each eye called a facial disk.

- Eurasian scops-owl, Otus scops
- African scops-owl, Otus senegalensis
- Southern white-faced owl, Ptilopsis granti
- Spotted eagle-owl, Bubo africanus
- Verreaux's eagle-owl, Ketupa lactea
- Pel's fishing-owl, Scotopelia peli
- Pearl-spotted owlet, Glaucidium perlatum
- African barred owlet, Glaucidium capense
- African wood-owl, Strix woodfordii
- Marsh owl, Asio capensis

== Mousebirds ==
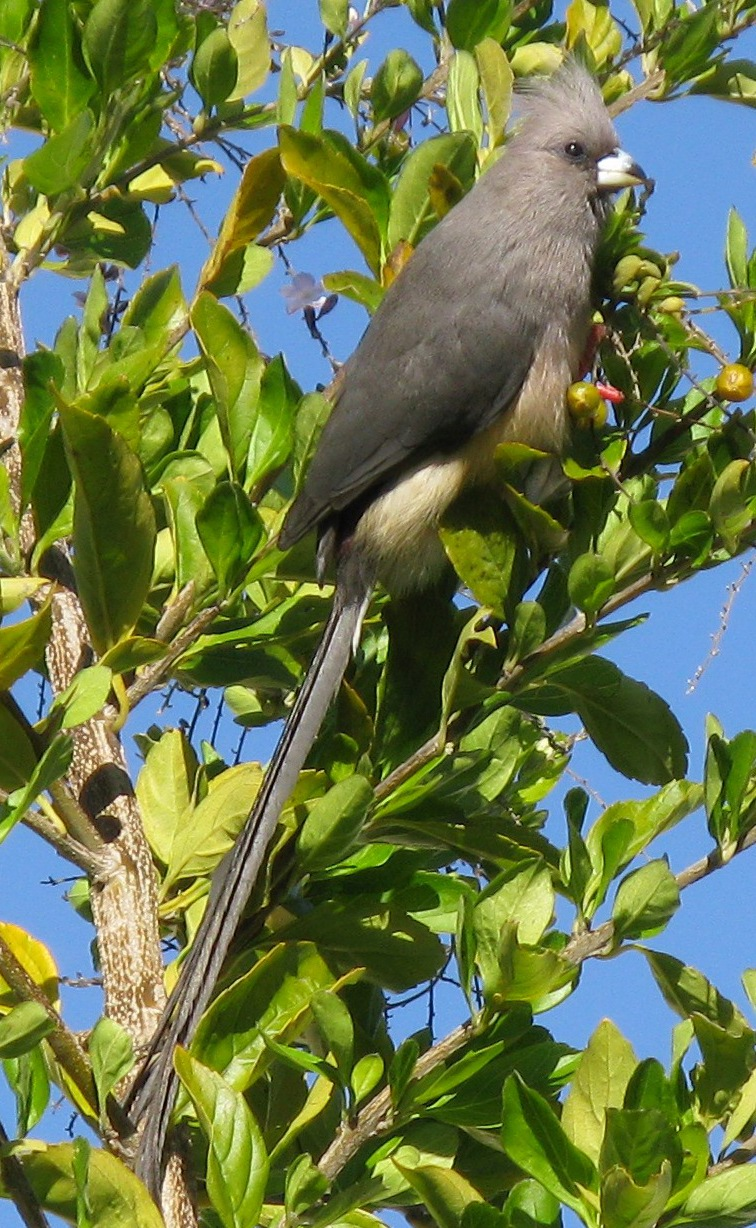
White-backed mousebird

Order: Coliiformes Family: Coliidae

The mousebirds are slender greyish or brown birds with soft, hairlike body feathers and very long thin tails. They are arboreal and scurry through the leaves like rodents in search of berries, fruit, and buds. They are acrobatic and can feed upside down. All species have strong claws and reversible outer toes. They also have crests and stubby bills.

- Speckled mousebird, Colius striatus
- White-backed mousebird, Colius colius
- Red-faced mousebird, Urocolius indicus

== Trogons ==
Order: Trogoniformes Family: Trogonidae

The family Trogonidae includes trogons and quetzals. Found in tropical woodlands worldwide, they feed on insects and fruit, and their broad bills and weak legs reflect their diet and arboreal habits. Although their flight is fast, they are reluctant to fly any distance. Trogons have soft, often colourful, feathers with distinctive male and female plumage.

- Narina trogon, Apaloderma narina (B)

== Hoopoes ==
Order: Bucerotiformes Family: Upupidae

Hoopoes have black, white, and orangey-pink colouring with a large erectile crest on their head.

- Eurasian hoopoe, Upupa epops

== Woodhoopoes and scimitarbills ==
Order: Bucerotiformes Family: Phoeniculidae

The woodhoopoes and scimitarbills are related to the hoopoes, ground-hornbills, and hornbills. They most resemble the hoopoes with their long curved bills, used to probe for insects, and short rounded wings. However, they differ in that they have metallic plumage, often blue, green, or purple, and lack an erectile crest.

- Green woodhoopoe, Phoeniculus purpureus
- Common scimitarbill, Rhinopomastus cyanomelas

== Ground-hornbills ==
Order: Bucerotiformes Family: Bucorvidae

The ground-hornbills are terrestrial birds which feed almost entirely on insects, other birds, snakes, and amphibians.

- Southern ground-hornbill, Bucorvus leadbeateri (B)

== Hornbills ==
Order: Bucerotiformes Family: Bucerotidae

Hornbills are a group of birds whose bill is shaped like a cow's horn, but without a twist, sometimes with a casque on the upper mandible. Frequently, the bill is brightly coloured.

- Crowned hornbill, Lophoceros alboterminatus (A)
- Bradfield's hornbill, Lophoceros bradfieldi
- African gray hornbill, Lophoceros nasutus
- Southern yellow-billed hornbill, Tockus leucomelas
- Southern red-billed hornbill, Tockus rufirostris
- Trumpeter hornbill, Bycanistes bucinator

== Kingfishers ==
Order: Coraciiformes Family: Alcedinidae

Kingfishers are medium-sized birds with large heads, long pointed bills, short legs, and stubby tails.

- Half-collared kingfisher, Alcedo semitorquata (A)
- Malachite kingfisher, Corythornis cristatus
- African pygmy kingfisher, Ispidina picta (B)
- Gray-headed kingfisher, Halcyon leucocephala (B)
- Woodland kingfisher, Halcyon senegalensis
- Brown-hooded kingfisher, Halcyon albiventris
- Striped kingfisher, Halcyon chelicuti
- Giant kingfisher, Megaceryle maxima
- Pied kingfisher, Ceryle rudis

== Bee-eaters ==
Order: Coraciiformes Family: Meropidae

The bee-eaters are a group of near passerine birds; most species are found in Africa but others occur in southern Europe, Madagascar, Australia, and New Guinea. They are characterised by richly coloured plumage, slender bodies, and usually elongated central tail feathers. All are colourful and have long downturned bills and pointed wings, which give them a swallow-like appearance when seen from afar.

- White-fronted bee-eater, Merops bullockoides
- Little bee-eater, Merops pusillus
- Swallow-tailed bee-eater, Merops hirundineus
- Blue-cheeked bee-eater, Merops persicus
- Madagascar bee-eater, Merops superciliosus (A)
- European bee-eater, Merops apiaster
- Southern carmine bee-eater, Merops nubicoides

== Rollers ==
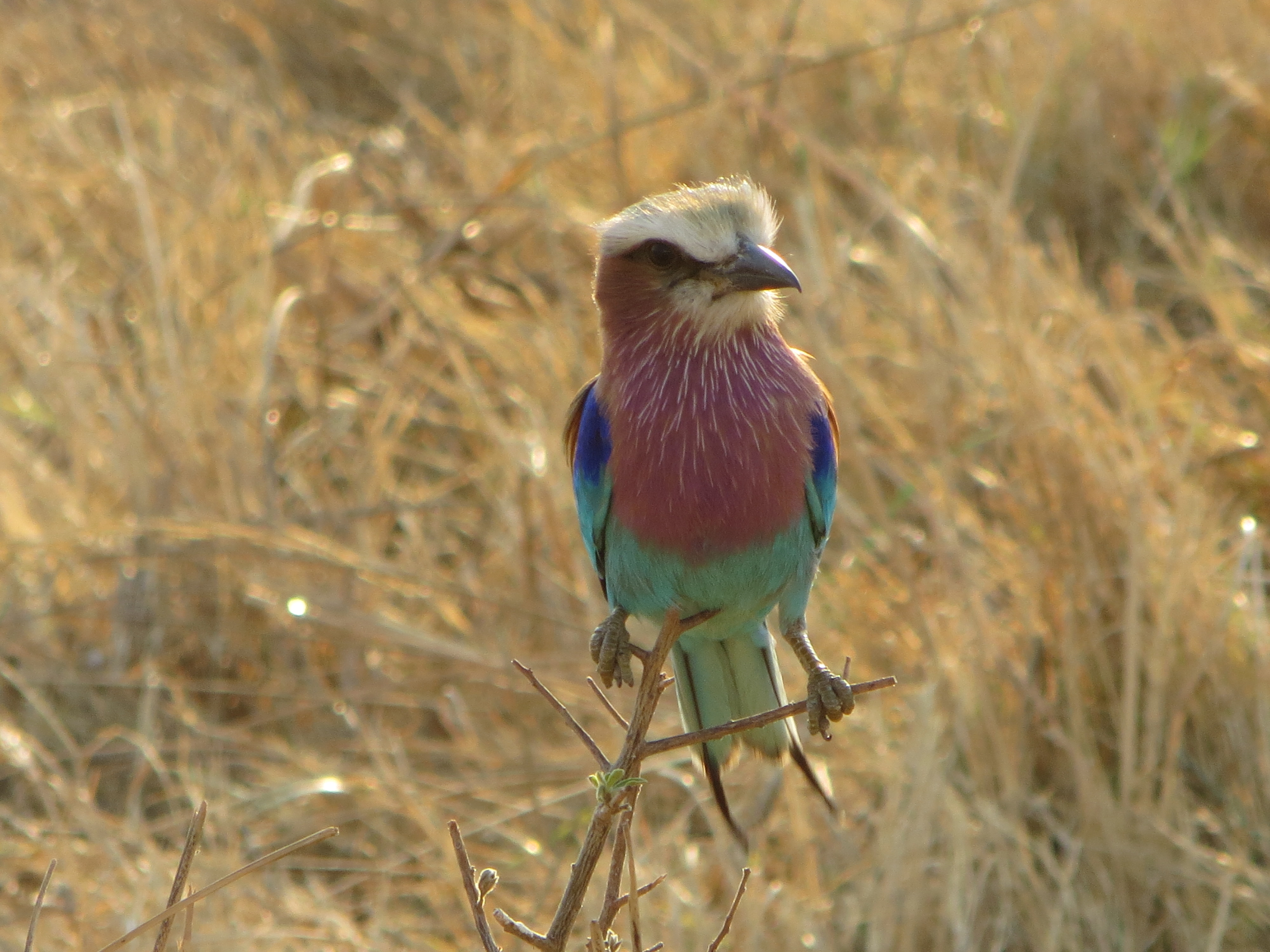
Lilac-breasted roller

Order: Coraciiformes Family: Coraciidae

Rollers resemble crows in size and build, but are more closely related to the kingfishers and bee-eaters. They share the colourful appearance of those groups with blues and browns predominating. The two inner front toes are connected, but the outer toe is not.

- European roller, Coracias garrulus (B)
- Lilac-breasted roller, Coracias caudatus
- Racket-tailed roller, Coracias spatulatus (B)
- Rufous-crowned roller, Coracias naevius
- Broad-billed roller, Eurystomus glaucurus

== African barbets ==
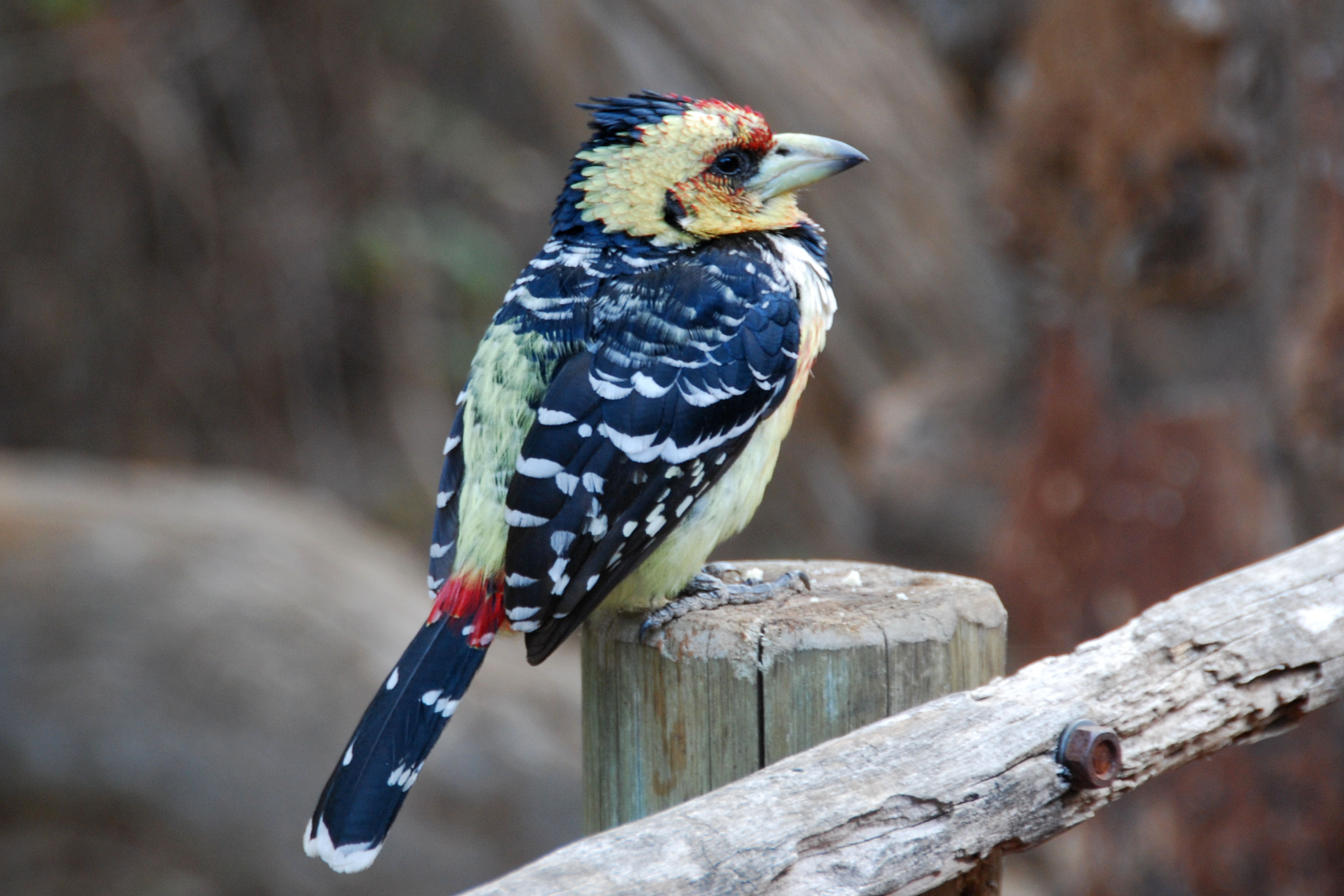
Crested barbet

Order: Piciformes Family: Lybiidae

The African barbets are plump birds with short necks and large heads. They get their name from the bristles which fringe their heavy bills. Most species are brightly coloured.

- Crested barbet, Trachyphonus vaillantii
- Yellow-fronted tinkerbird, Pogoniulus chrysoconus
- Pied barbet, Tricholaema leucomelas
- Black-collared barbet, Lybius torquatus

== Honeyguides ==
Order: Piciformes Family: Indicatoridae

Honeyguides are among the few birds that feed on wax. They are named for the greater honeyguide which leads traditional honey-hunters to bees' nests and, after the hunters have harvested the honey, feeds on the remaining contents of the hive.

- Green-backed honeyguide, Prodotiscus zambesiae (A)
- Wahlberg's honeyguide, Prodotiscus regulus (B)
- Lesser honeyguide, Indicator minor
- Greater honeyguide, Indicator indicator

== Woodpeckers ==
Order: Piciformes Family: Picidae

Woodpeckers are small to medium-sized birds with chisel-like beaks, short legs, stiff tails, and long tongues used for capturing insects. Some species have feet with two toes pointing forward and two backward, while several species have only three toes. Many woodpeckers have the habit of tapping noisily on tree trunks with their beaks.

- Cardinal woodpecker, Dendropicos fuscescens
- Bearded woodpecker, Chloropicus namaquus
- Olive woodpecker, Dendropicos griseocephalus (A)
- Bennett's woodpecker, Campethera bennettii
- Golden-tailed woodpecker, Campethera abingoni

== Falcons and caracaras ==
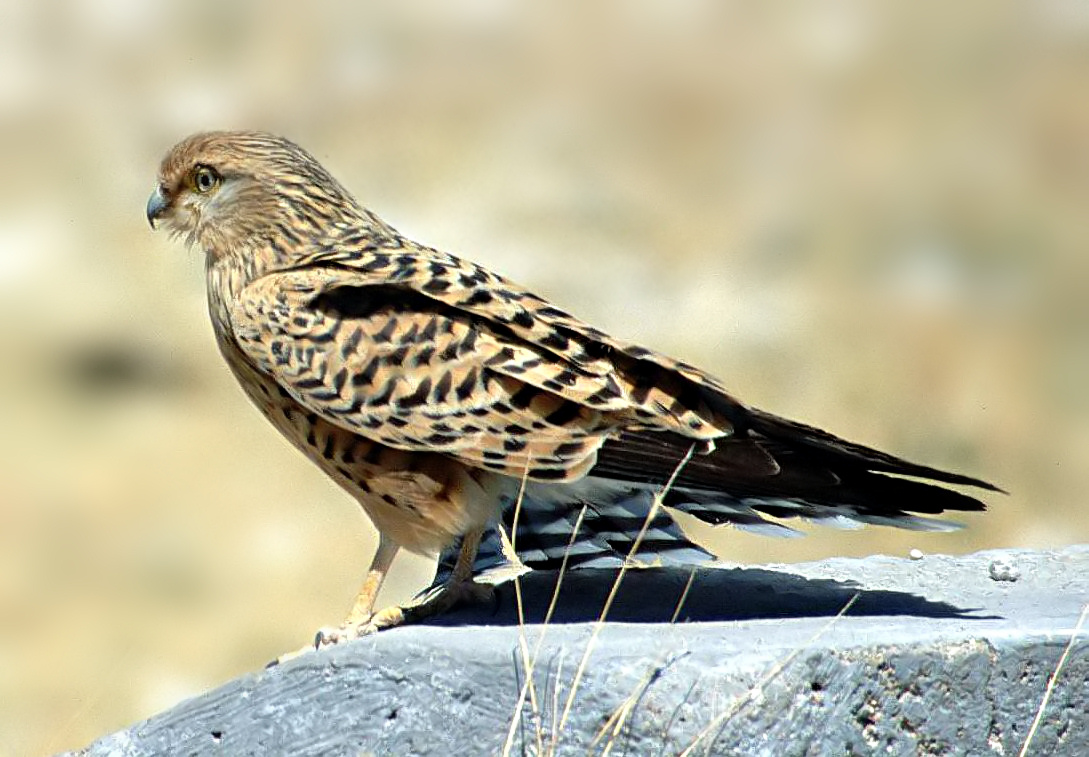
Greater kestrel

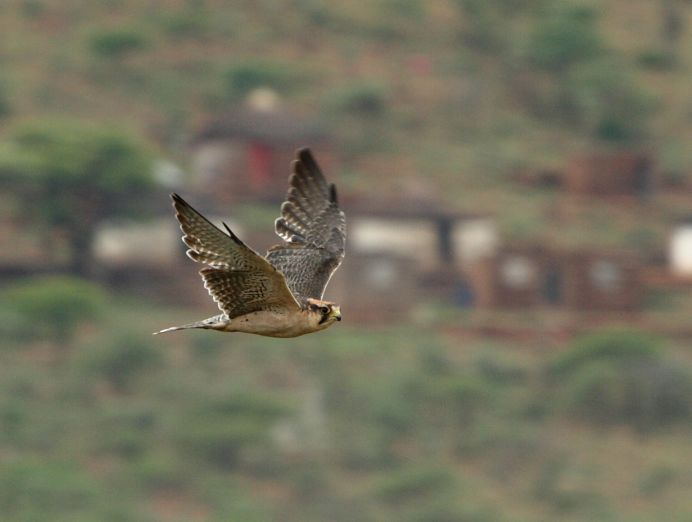
Lanner falcon

Order: Falconiformes Family: Falconidae

Falconidae is a family of diurnal birds of prey. They differ from hawks, eagles, and kites in that they kill with their beaks instead of their talons.

- Pygmy falcon, Polihierax semitorquatus
- Lesser kestrel, Falco naumanni (B)
- Eurasian kestrel, Falco tinnunculus
- Rock kestrel, Falco rupicolus
- Greater kestrel, Falco rupicoloides
- Dickinson's kestrel, Falco dickinsoni
- Red-necked falcon, Falco chicquera
- Red-footed falcon, Falco vespertinus (B)
- Amur falcon, Falco amurensis (B)
- Eleonora's falcon, Falco eleonorae (A)
- Sooty falcon, Falco concolor (A)
- Eurasian hobby, Falco subbuteo (B)
- African hobby, Falco cuvierii (B)
- Lanner falcon, Falco biarmicus
- Peregrine falcon, Falco peregrinus (B)

== Old World parrots ==
Order: Psittaciformes Family: Psittaculidae.

Characteristic features of parrots include a strong curved bill, an upright stance, strong legs, and clawed zygodactyl feet. Many parrots are vividly colored, and some are multi-colored. In size they range from 8 cm (3.1 in) to 1 m (3.3 ft) in length. Old World parrots are found from Africa east across south and southeast Asia and Oceania to Australia and New Zealand.

- Rosy-faced lovebird, Agapornis roseicollis (A)

== African and New World parrots ==
Order: Psittaciformes Family: Psittacidae.

Characteristic features of parrots include a strong curved bill, an upright stance, strong legs, and clawed zygodactyl feet. Many parrots are vividly coloured, and some are multi-coloured. In size they range from 8 cm (3.1 in) to 1 m (3.3 ft) in length. Most of the more than 150 species in this family are found in the New World.

- Brown-necked parrot, Poicephalus fuscicollis (A)
- Meyer's parrot, Poicephalus meyeri

== African and green broadbills ==
Order: Passeriformes Family: Calyptomenidae

The broadbills are small, brightly coloured birds which feed on fruit and also take insects in flycatcher fashion, snapping their broad bills. Their habitat is canopies of wet forests.

- African broadbill, Smithornis capensis

== Cuckooshrikes ==
Order: Passeriformes Family: Campephagidae

The cuckooshrikes are small to medium-sized passerine birds. They are predominantly greyish with white and black, although some species are brightly coloured.

- White-breasted cuckooshrike, Ceblepyris pectoralis
- Black cuckooshrike, Campephaga flava

== Old World orioles ==
Order: Passeriformes Family: Oriolidae

The Old World orioles are colourful passerine birds which are not related to the similar-appearing New World orioles.

- Eurasian golden oriole, Oriolus oriolus
- African golden oriole, Oriolus auratus
- African black-headed oriole, Oriolus larvatus

== Wattle-eyes and batises ==
Order: Passeriformes Family: Platysteiridae

The wattle-eyes, or puffback flycatchers, are small stout passerine birds of the African tropics. They get their name from the brightly coloured fleshy eye decorations found in most species in this group.

- Cape batis, Batis capensis (A)
- Chinspot batis, Batis molitor
- Pririt batis, Batis pririt

== Vangas, helmetshrikes, and allies ==
Order: Passeriformes Family: Vangidae

The helmetshrikes are similar in build to the shrikes, but tend to be colourful species with distinctive crests or other head ornaments, such as wattles, from which they get their name.

- White helmetshrike, Prionops plumatus
- Retz's helmetshrike, Prionops retzii

== Bushshrikes and allies ==
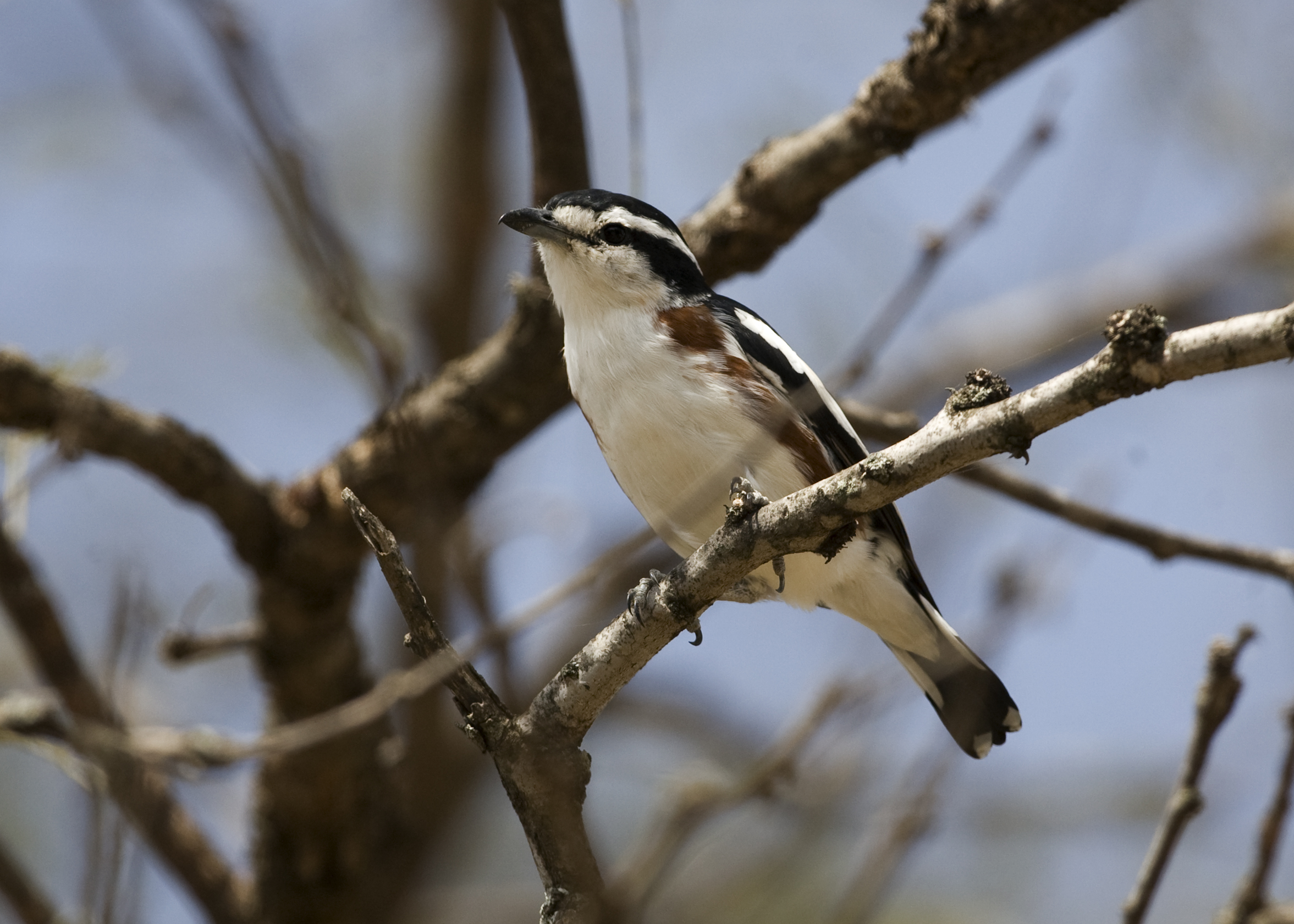
Brubru

Order: Passeriformes Family: Malaconotidae

Bushshrikes are similar in habits to shrikes, hunting insects and other small prey from a perch on a bush. Although similar in build to the shrikes, these tend to be either colourful species or largely black; some species are quite secretive.

- Brubru, Nilaus afer
- Black-backed puffback, Dryoscopus cubla
- Black-crowned tchagra, Tchagra senegalus
- Brown-crowned tchagra, Tchagra australis
- Tropical boubou, Laniarius major
- Gabon boubou, Laniarius bicolor
- Southern boubou, Laniarius ferrugineus
- Crimson-breasted gonolek, Laniarius atrococcineus
- Bokmakierie, Telophorus zeylonus (B)
- Sulphur-breasted bushshrike, Chlorophoneus sulfureopectus
- Gray-headed bushshrike, Malaconotus blanchoti

== Drongos ==
Order: Passeriformes Family: Dicruridae

The drongos are mostly black or dark grey in colour, sometimes with metallic tints. They have long forked tails, and some Asian species have elaborate tail decorations. They have short legs and sit very upright when perched, like a shrike. They flycatch or take prey from the ground.

- Fork-tailed drongo, Dicrurus adsimilis

== Monarch flycatchers ==
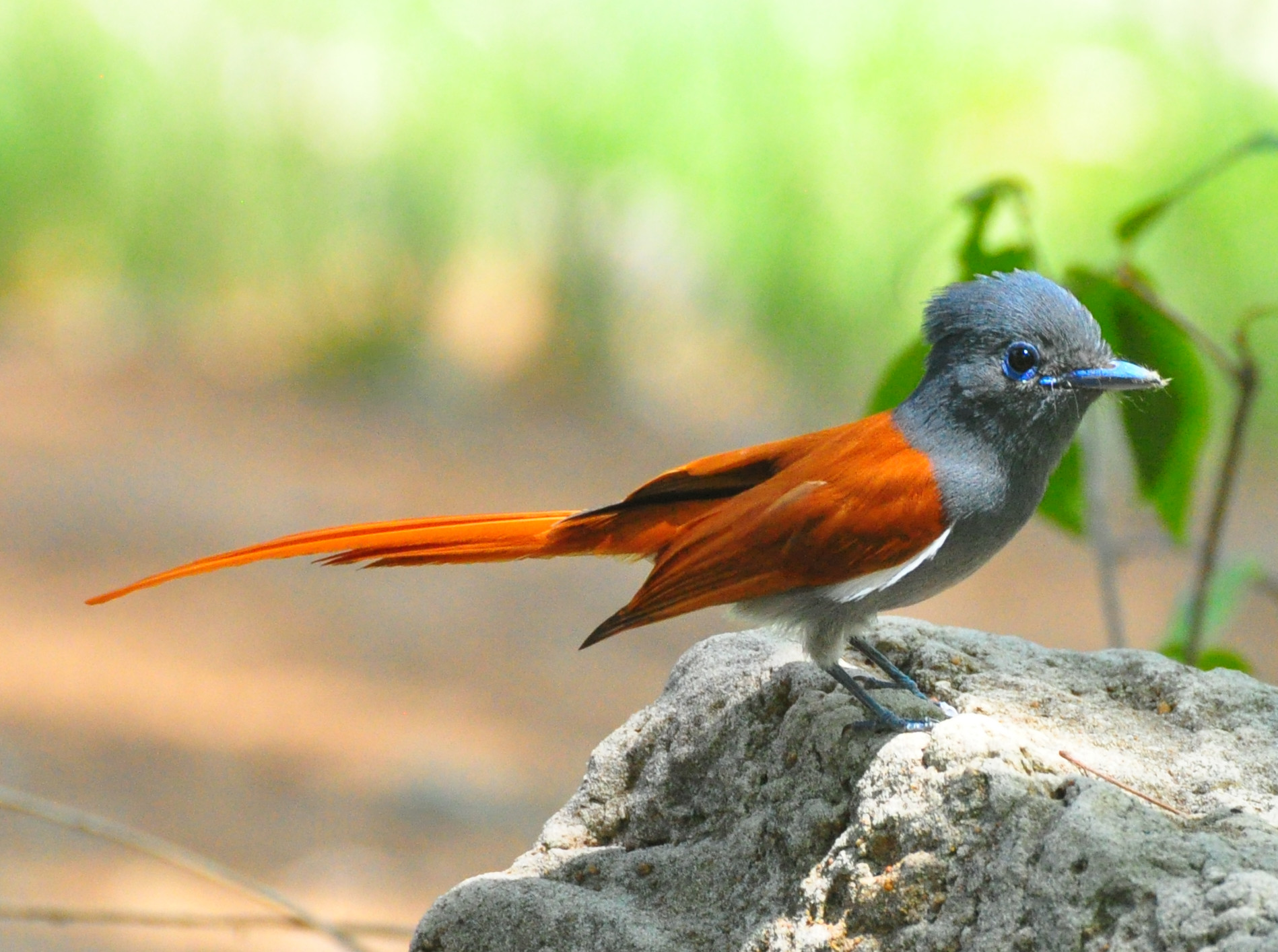
African paradise-flycatcher

Order: Passeriformes Family: Monarchidae

The monarch flycatchers are small to medium-sized insectivorous passerines which hunt by flycatching.

- African paradise-flycatcher, Terpsiphone viridis

== Shrikes ==
Order: Passeriformes Family: Laniidae

Shrikes are passerine birds known for their habit of catching other birds and small animals and impaling the uneaten portions of their bodies on thorns. A shrike's beak is hooked, like that of a typical bird of prey.

- Red-backed shrike, Lanius collurio
- Isabelline shrike, Lanius isabellinus (A)
- Lesser gray shrike, Lanius minor
- Magpie shrike, Lanius melanoleucus
- Northern fiscal, Lanius humeralis
- Southern fiscal, Lanius collaris
- Souza's shrike, Lanius souzae (A)
- White-crowned shrike, Eurocephalus anguitimens

== Crows, jays, and magpies ==
Order: Passeriformes Family: Corvidae

The family Corvidae includes crows, ravens, jays, choughs, magpies, treepies, nutcrackers, and ground jays. Corvids are above average in size among the Passeriformes, and some of the larger species show high levels of intelligence.

- Cape crow, Corvus capensis
- Pied crow, Corvus albus
- White-necked raven, Corvus albicollis (A)

== Fairy flycatchers ==
Order: Passeriformes Family: Stenostiridae

Most of the species of this small family are found in Africa, though a few inhabit tropical Asia. They are not closely related to other birds called "flycatchers".

- Fairy flycatcher, Stenostira scita (B)

== Tits, chickadees, and titmice ==
Order: Passeriformes Family: Paridae

The Paridae are mainly small stocky woodland species with short stout bills. Some have crests. They are adaptable birds, with a mixed diet including seeds and insects.

- Rufous-bellied tit, Melaniparus rufiventris
- Southern black-tit, Melaniparus niger
- Ashy tit, Melaniparus cinerascens

== Penduline-tits ==
Order: Passeriformes Family: Remizidae

The penduline-tits are a group of small passerine birds related to the true tits. They are insectivores.

- African penduline-tit, Anthoscopus caroli
- Southern penduline-tit, Anthoscopus minutus

== Larks ==
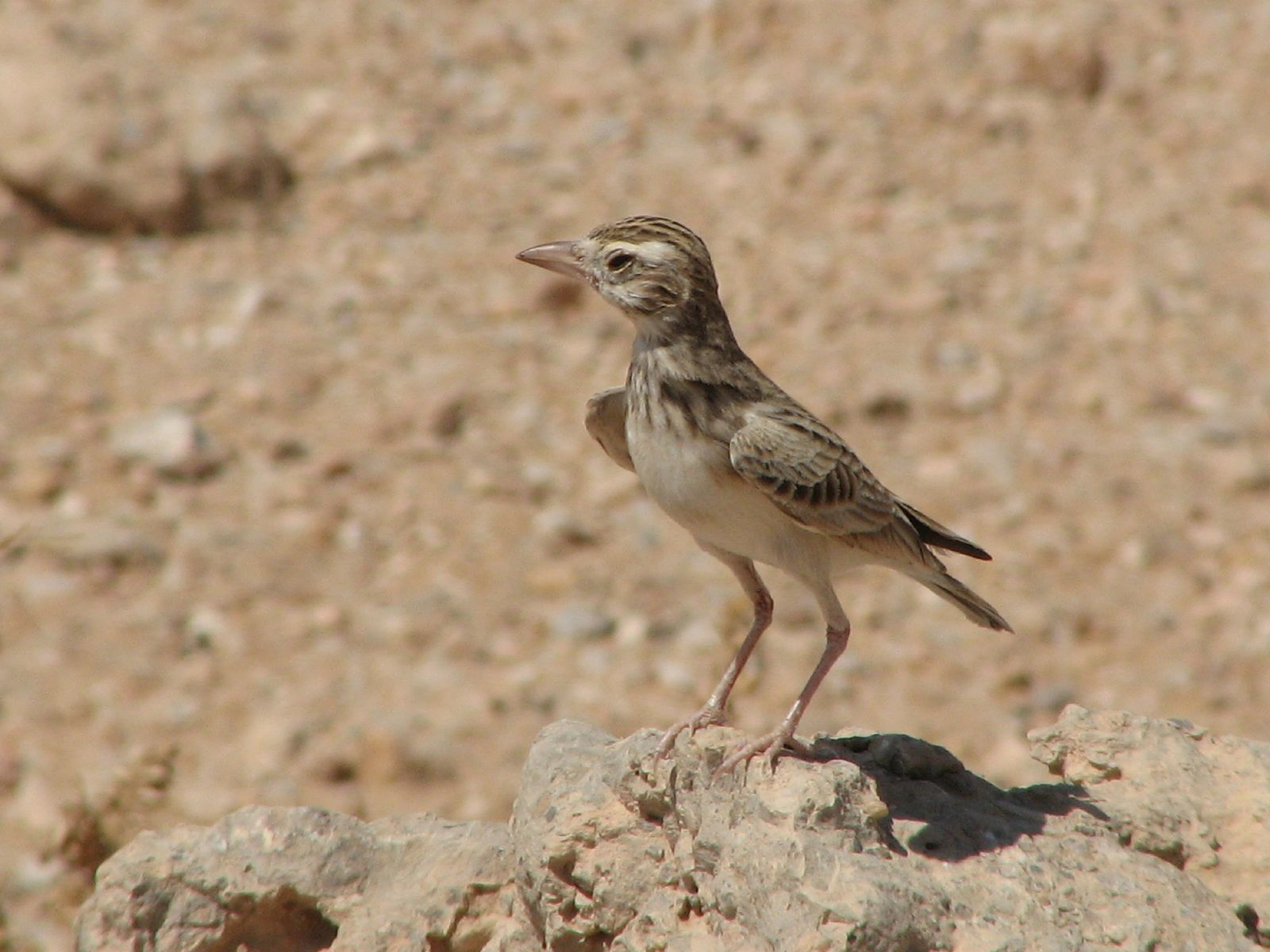
Stark's lark

Order: Passeriformes Family: Alaudidae

Larks are small terrestrial birds with often extravagant songs and display flights. Most larks are fairly dull in appearance. Their food is insects and seeds.

- Spike-heeled lark, Chersomanes albofasciata
- Short-clawed lark, Certhilauda chuana
- Dusky lark, Pinarocorys nigricans
- Black-eared sparrow-lark, Eremopterix australis (A)
- Chestnut-backed sparrow-lark, Eremopterix leucotis
- Gray-backed sparrow-lark, Eremopterix verticalis
- Sabota lark, Calendulauda sabota
- Fawn-colored lark, Calendulauda africanoides
- Red lark, Calendulauda burra
- Eastern clapper lark, Corypha fasciolata
- Rufous-naped lark, Corypha africana
- Flappet lark, Amirafra rufocinnamomea
- Monotonous lark, Mirafra passerina
- Latakoo lark, Mirafra cheniana (A)
- Red-capped lark, Calandrella cinerea
- Stark's lark, Spizocorys starki (B)
- Pink-billed lark, Spizocorys conirostris

== Nicators ==
Order: Passeriformes Family: Nicatoridae

The nicators are shrike-like, with hooked bills. They are endemic to sub-Saharan Africa.

- Eastern nicator, Nicator gularis (A)

== African warblers ==
Order: Passeriformes Family: Macrosphenidae

The African warblers are small to medium-sized insectivores which are found in a wide variety of habitats south of the Sahara.

- Red-faced crombec, Sylvietta whytii (A)
- Cape crombec, Sylvietta rufescens

== Cisticolas and allies ==
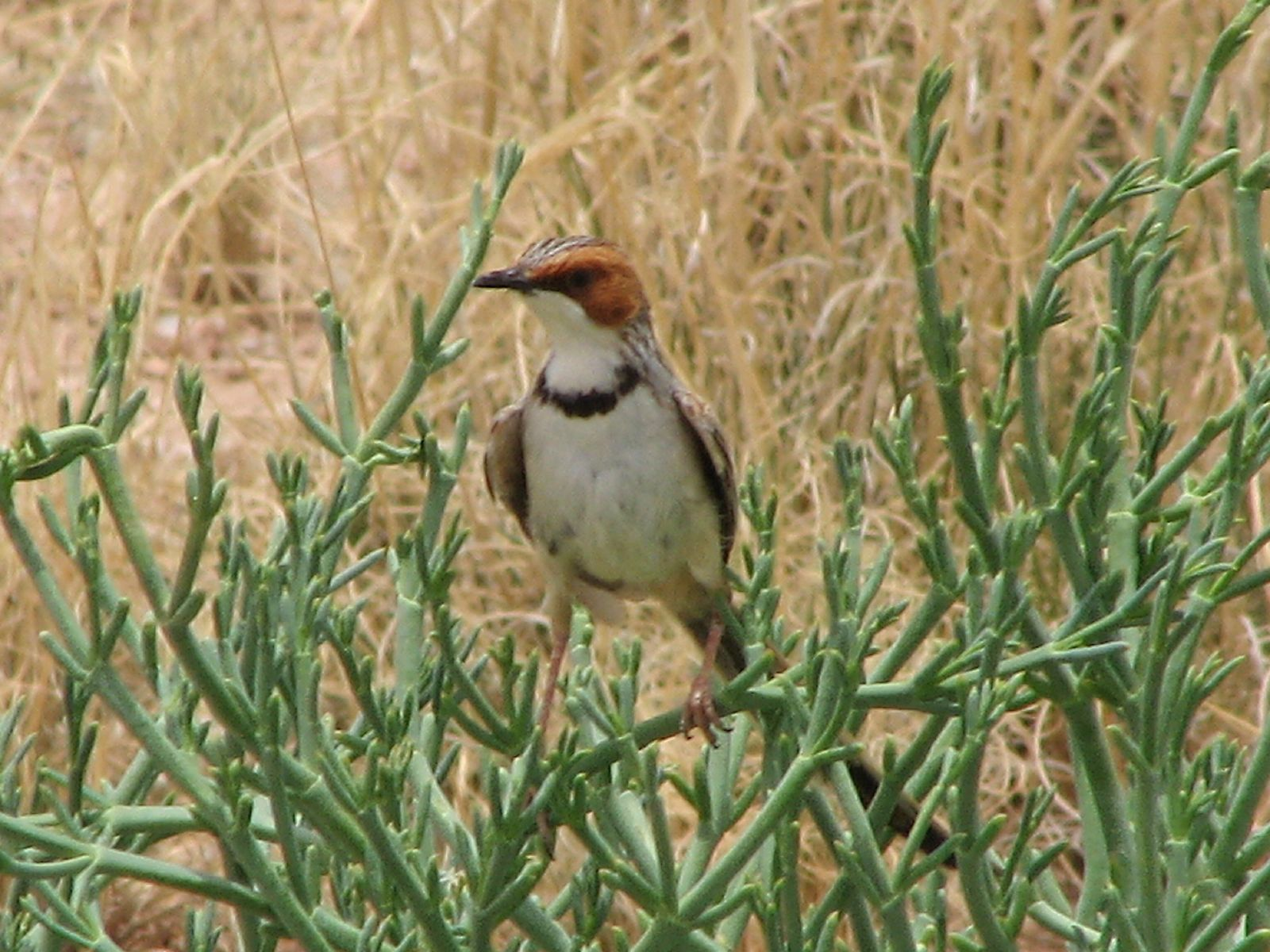
Rufous-eared warbler

Order: Passeriformes Family: Cisticolidae

The Cisticolidae are warblers found mainly in warmer southern regions of the Old World. They are generally very small birds of drab brown or grey appearance found in open country such as grassland or scrub.

- Yellow-bellied eremomela, Eremomela icteropygialis
- Greencap eremomela, Eremomela scotops
- Burnt-necked eremomela, Eremomela usticollis
- Miombo wren-warbler, Calamonastes undosus
- Stierling's wren-warbler, Calamonastes stierlingi
- Barred wren-warbler, Calamonastes fasciolatus
- Green-backed camaroptera, Camaroptera brachyura
- Bar-throated apalis, Apalis thoracica
- Yellow-breasted apalis, Apalis flavida
- Tawny-flanked prinia, Prinia subflava
- Black-chested prinia, Prinia flavicans
- Rufous-eared warbler, Malcorus pectoralis
- Red-faced cisticola, Cisticola erythrops
- Rock-loving cisticola, Cisticola aberrans
- Rattling cisticola, Cisticola chiniana
- Tinkling cisticola, Cisticola rufilatus
- Luapula cisticola, Cisticola luapula
- Chirping cisticola, Cisticola pipiens
- Rufous-winged cisticola, Cisticola galactotes
- Levaillant's cisticola, Cisticola tinniens
- Croaking cisticola, Cisticola natalensis
- Piping cisticola, Cisticola fulvicapilla
- Zitting cisticola, Cisticola juncidis
- Desert cisticola, Cisticola aridulus
- Cloud cisticola, Cisticola textrix (A)
- Pale-crowned cisticola, Cisticola cinnamomeus (A)

== Reed warblers and allies ==
Order: Passeriformes Family: Acrocephalidae

The members of this family are usually rather large for "warblers". Most are rather plain olivaceous brown above with much yellow to beige below. They are usually found in open woodland, reedbeds, or tall grass. The family occurs mostly in southern to western Eurasia and surroundings, but it also ranges far into the Pacific, with some species in Africa.

- African yellow-warbler, Iduna natalensis (A)
- Olive-tree warbler, Hippolais olivetorum (B)
- Icterine warbler, Hippolais icterina
- Sedge warbler, Acrocephalus schoenobaenus
- Marsh warbler, Acrocephalus palustris
- Common reed warbler, Acrocephalus scirpaceus
- Basra reed warbler, Acrocephalus griseldis (A)
- Lesser swamp warbler, Acrocephalus gracilirostris
- Greater swamp warbler, Acrocephalus rufescens
- Great reed warbler, Acrocephalus arundinaceus

== Grassbirds and allies ==
Order: Passeriformes Family: Locustellidae

Locustellidae are a family of small insectivorous songbirds found mainly in Eurasia, Africa, and the Australian region. They are smallish birds with tails that are usually long and pointed, and tend to be drab brownish or buffy all over.

- River warbler, Locustella fluviatilis (B)
- Little rush warbler, Bradypterus baboecala

== Swallows ==
Order: Passeriformes Family: Hirundinidae

The family Hirundinidae is adapted to aerial feeding. They have a slender streamlined body, long pointed wings, and a short bill with a wide gape. The feet are adapted to perching rather than walking, and the front toes are partially joined at the base.

- Plain martin, Riparia paludicola (B)
- Bank swallow, Riparia riparia
- Banded martin, Neophedina cincta
- Rock martin, Ptyonoprogne fuligula
- Barn swallow, Hirundo rustica
- Red-chested swallow, Hirundo lucida (A)
- Angola swallow, Hirundo angolensis (A)
- White-throated swallow, Hirundo albigularis
- Wire-tailed swallow, Hirundo smithii
- Pearl-breasted swallow, Hirundo dimidiata (B)
- Greater striped swallow, Cecropis cucullata
- Lesser striped swallow, Cecropis abyssinica
- Rufous-chested swallow, Cecropis semirufa
- Mosque swallow, Cecropis senegalensis (B)
- South African swallow, Petrochelidon spilodera (B)
- Common house-martin, Delichon urbicum
- Black sawwing, Psalidoprocne pristoptera (A)
- Gray-rumped swallow, Pseudhirundo griseopyga

== Bulbuls ==
Order: Passeriformes Family: Pycnonotidae

Bulbuls are medium-sized songbirds. Some are colourful with yellow, red, or orange vents, cheeks, throats, or supercilia, but most are drab, with uniform olive-brown to black plumage. Some species have distinct crests.

- Yellow-bellied greenbul, Chlorocichla flaviventris
- Terrestrial brownbul, Phyllastrephus terrestris
- Common bulbul, Pycnonotus barbatus
- Black-fronted bulbul, Pycnonotus nigricans

== Leaf warblers ==
Order: Passeriformes Family: Phylloscopidae

Leaf warblers are a family of small insectivorous birds found mostly in Eurasia and ranging into Wallacea and Africa. The species are of various sizes, often green-plumaged above and yellow below, or more subdued with greyish-green to greyish-brown colours.

- Willow warbler, Phylloscopus trochilus

== Sylviid warblers, Parrotbills, and allies ==
Order: Passeriformes Family: Sylviidae

The family Sylviidae ("Old World warblers") is a group of small insectivorous passerine birds. They mainly occur as breeding species, as the common name implies, in Europe, Asia and, to a lesser extent, Africa. Most are of generally undistinguished appearance, but many have distinctive songs.

- Eurasian blackcap, Sylvia atricapilla (A)
- Garden warbler, Sylvia borin (B)
- Barred warbler, Curruca nisoria
- Chestnut-vented warbler, Curruca subcoerulea
- Greater whitethroat, Curruca communis

== White-eyes, yuhinas, and allies ==
Order: Passeriformes Family: Zosteropidae

The white-eyes are small and mostly undistinguished, their plumage above being generally some dull colour like greenish-olive, but some species have a white or bright yellow throat, breast or lower parts, and several have buff flanks. As their name suggests, many species have a white ring around each eye.

- Orange River white-eye, Zosterops pallidus
- Cape white-eye, Zosterops virens
- Southern yellow white-eye, Zosterops anderssoni

== Laughingthrushes and allies ==
Order: Passeriformes Family: Leiothrichidae

The members of this family are diverse in size and colouration, though those of genus Turdoides tend to be brown or greyish. The family is found in Africa, India, and southeast Asia.

- Arrow-marked babbler, Turdoides jardineii
- Southern pied-babbler, Turdoides bicolor
- Hartlaub's babbler, Turdoides hartlaubii
- Black-faced babbler, Turdoides melanops

== Treecreepers ==
Order: Passeriformes Family: Certhiidae

Treecreepers are small woodland birds, brown above and white below. They have thin pointed down-curved bills, which they use to extricate insects from bark. They have stiff tail feathers, like woodpeckers, which they use to support themselves on vertical trees.

- African spotted creeper, Salpornis salvadori (A)

== Oxpeckers ==
Order: Passeriformes Family: Buphagidae

As both the English and scientific names of these birds imply, they feed on ectoparasites, primarily ticks, found on large mammals.

- Red-billed oxpecker, Buphagus erythrorynchus
- Yellow-billed oxpecker, Buphagus africanus

== Starlings ==
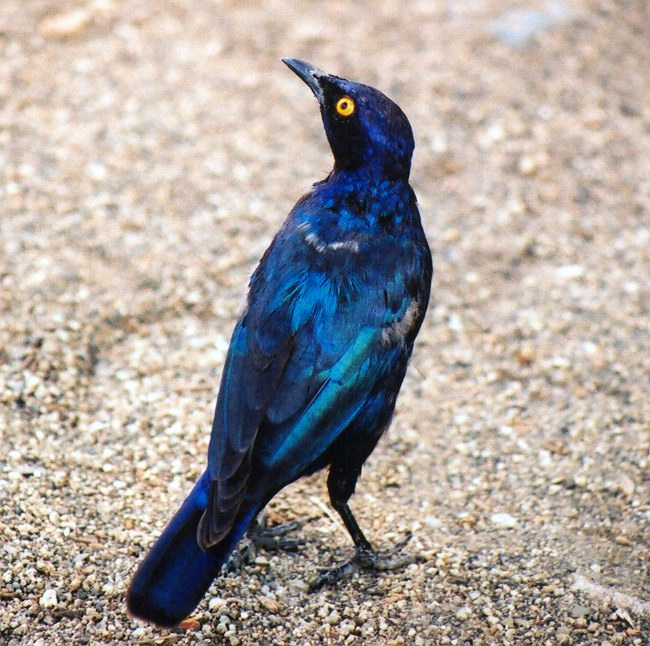
Cape starling

Order: Passeriformes Family: Sturnidae

Starlings are small to medium-sized passerine birds. Their flight is strong and direct and they are very gregarious. Their preferred habitat is fairly open country. They eat insects and fruit. Plumage is typically dark with a metallic sheen.

- European starling, Sturnus vulgaris (A)
- Wattled starling, Creatophora cinerea
- Common myna, Acridotheres tristis (I)
- Violet-backed starling, Cinnyricinclus leucogaster
- Pale-winged starling, Onychognathus nabouroup (A)
- Red-winged starling, Onychognathus morio
- Burchell's starling, Lamprotornis australis
- Meves's starling, Lamprotornis mevesii
- Lesser blue-eared starling, Lamprotornis chloropterus (A)
- Sharp-tailed starling, Lamprotornis acuticaudus (B)
- Greater blue-eared starling, Lamprotornis chalybaeus
- Cape starling, Lamprotornis nitens

== Thrushes and allies ==
Order: Passeriformes Family: Turdidae

The thrushes are a group of passerine birds that occur mainly in the Old World. They are plump, soft plumaged, small to medium-sized insectivores or sometimes omnivores, often feeding on the ground. Many have attractive songs.

- Groundscraper thrush, Turdus litsitsirupa
- Kurrichane thrush, Turdus libonyana
- Olive thrush, Turdus olivaceus
- Karoo thrush, Turdus smithi

== Old World flycatchers ==
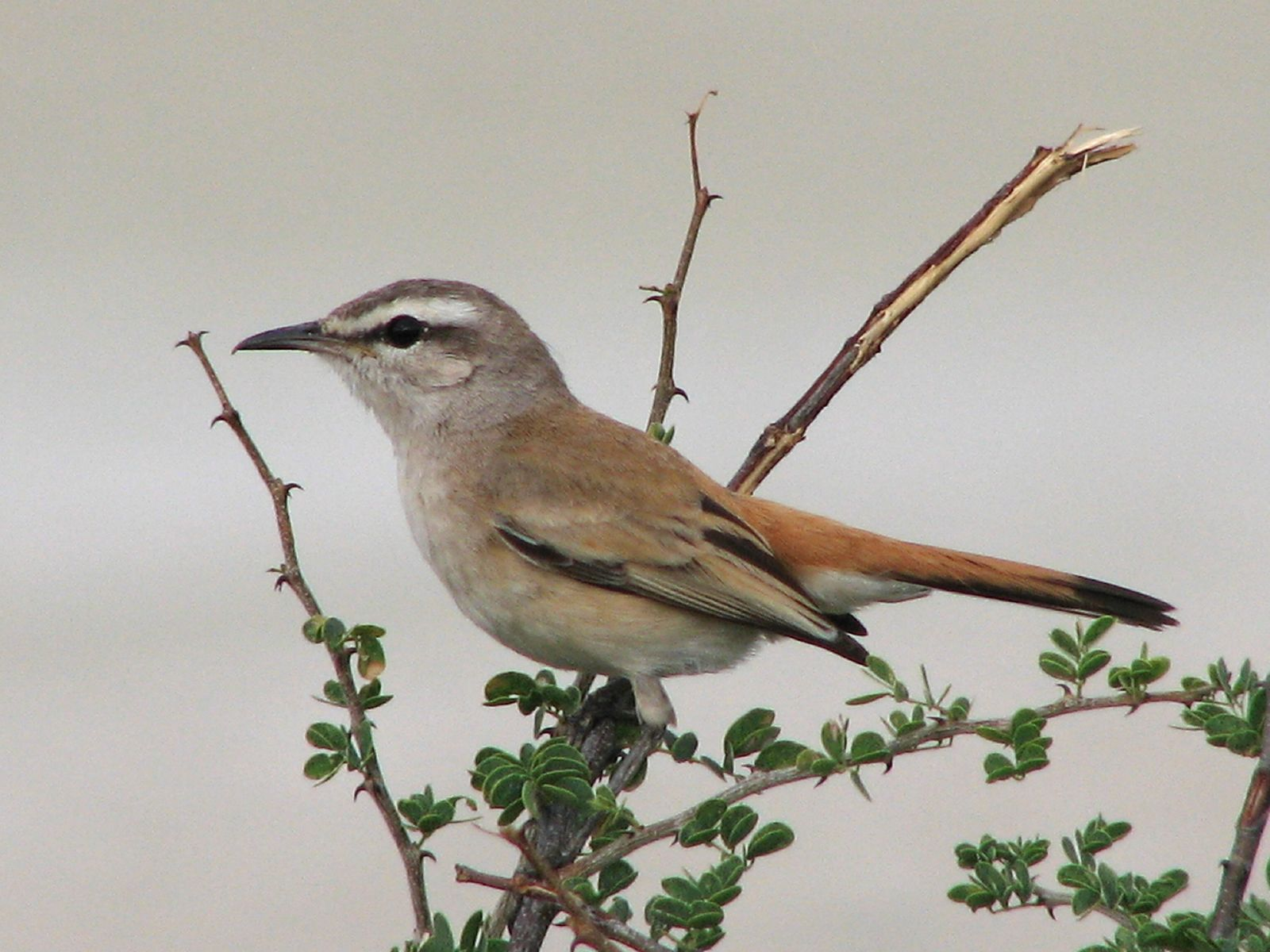
Kalahari scrub-robin

Order: Passeriformes Family: Muscicapidae

Old World flycatchers are a large group of small passerine birds native to the Old World. They are mainly small arboreal insectivores. The appearance of these birds is highly varied, but they mostly have weak songs and harsh calls.

- Spotted flycatcher, Muscicapa striata
- Mariqua flycatcher, Bradornis mariquensis
- Pale flycatcher, Agricola pallidus
- Chat flycatcher, Agricola infuscatus
- Gray tit-flycatcher, Fraseria plumbea
- Ashy flycatcher, Fraseria caerulescens
- Fiscal flycatcher, Sigelus silens
- Southern black-flycatcher, Melaenornis pammelaina
- Bearded scrub-robin, Tychaedon quadrivirgata (B)
- Kalahari scrub-robin, Cercotrichas paena
- Red-backed scrub-robin, Cercotrichas leucophrys
- Cape robin-chat, Dessonornis caffer (A)
- White-throated robin-chat, Dessonornis humeralis
- White-browed robin-chat, Cossypha heuglini
- Red-capped robin-chat, Cossypha natalensis (A)
- Collared palm-thrush, Cichladusa arquata (A)
- Thrush nightingale, Luscinia luscinia (B)
- Short-toed rock-thrush, Monticola brevipes
- Miombo rock-thrush, Monticola angolensis
- Cape rock-thrush, Monticola rupestris (A)
- Whinchat, Saxicola rubetra (A)
- African stonechat, Saxicola torquatus
- Sickle-winged chat, Emarginata sinuata (A)
- Mocking cliff-chat, Thamnolaea cinnamomeiventris
- Southern anteater-chat, Myrmecocichla formicivora
- Mountain wheatear, Myrmecocichla monticola (A)
- Arnot's chat, Myrmecocichla arnotti
- Northern wheatear, Oenanthe oenanthe (A)
- Capped wheatear, Oenanthe pileata
- Isabelline wheatear, Oenanthe isabellina (A)
- Pied wheatear, Oenanthe pleschanka (A)
- Familiar chat, Oenanthe familiaris
- Boulder chat, Pinarornis plumosus

== Sunbirds and spiderhunters ==
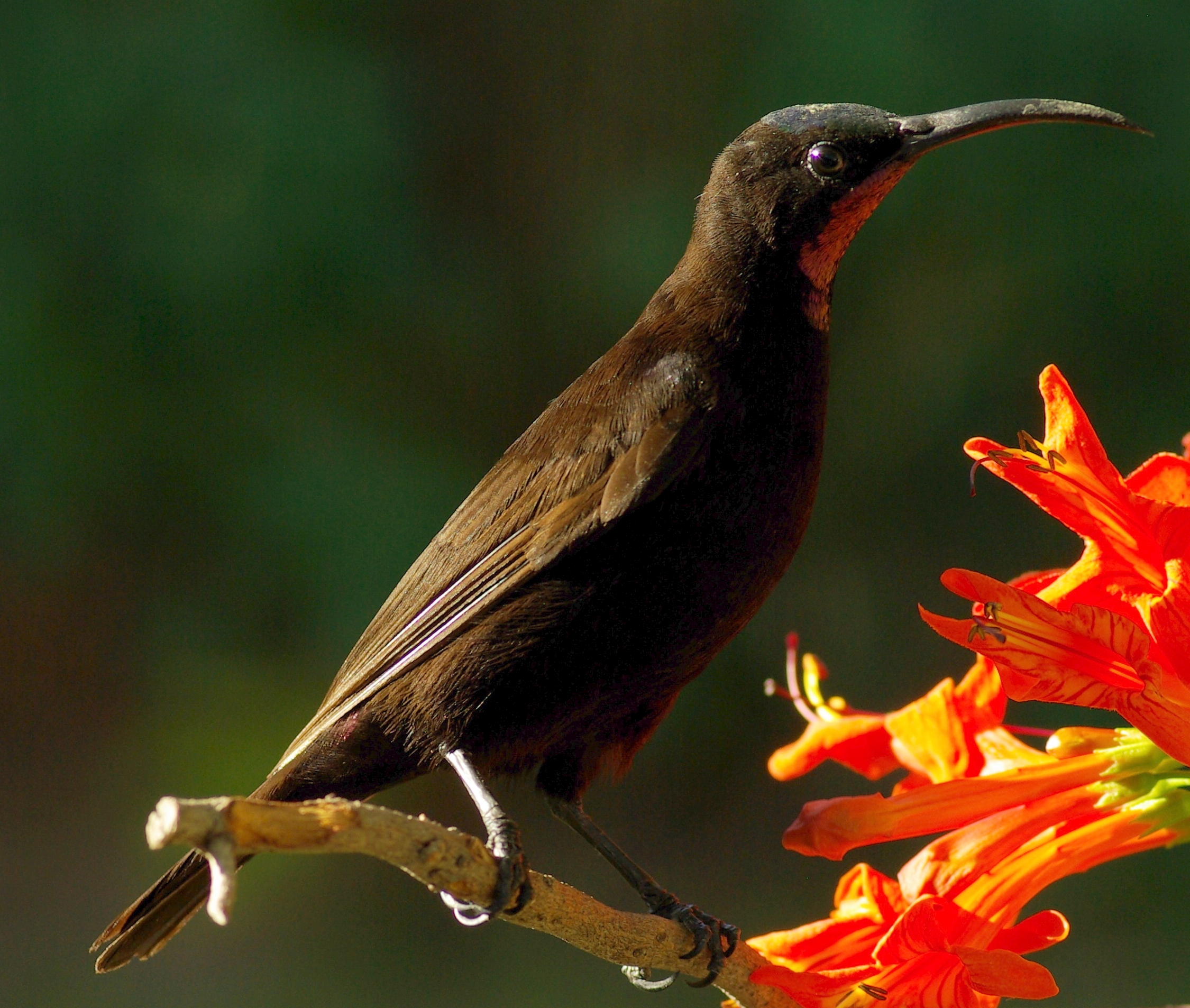
Amethyst sunbird

Order: Passeriformes Family: Nectariniidae

The sunbirds and spiderhunters are very small passerine birds which feed largely on nectar, although they will also take insects, especially when feeding young. Flight is fast and direct on their short wings. Most species can take nectar by hovering like a hummingbird, but usually perch to feed.

- Collared sunbird, Hedydipna collaris
- Amethyst sunbird, Chalcomitra amethystina
- Scarlet-chested sunbird, Chalcomitra senegalensis
- Marico sunbird, Cinnyris mariquensis
- Purple-banded sunbird, Cinnyris bifasciatus (B)
- White-breasted sunbird, Cinnyris talatala
- Dusky sunbird, Cinnyris fuscus (B)
- Copper sunbird, Cinnyris cupreus (A)

== Weavers and allies ==
Order: Passeriformes Family: Ploceidae

The weavers are small passerine birds related to the finches. They are seed-eating birds with rounded conical bills. The males of many species are brightly coloured, usually in red or yellow and black, and some species show variation in colour only in the breeding season.

- Red-billed buffalo-weaver, Bubalornis niger
- Scaly weaver, Sporopipes squamifrons
- White-browed sparrow-weaver, Plocepasser mahali
- Sociable weaver, Philetairus socius
- Red-headed weaver, Anaplectes rubriceps
- Spectacled weaver, Ploceus ocularis
- Holub's golden-weaver, Ploceus xanthops
- Southern brown-throated weaver, Ploceus xanthopterus
- Lesser masked-weaver, Ploceus intermedius
- Southern masked-weaver, Ploceus velatus
- Village weaver, Ploceus cucullatus (B)
- Chestnut weaver, Ploceus rubiginosus (B)
- Red-headed quelea, Quelea erythrops (A)
- Red-billed quelea, Quelea quelea
- Southern red bishop, Euplectes orix
- Yellow-crowned bishop, Euplectes afer
- White-winged widowbird, Euplectes albonotatus
- Red-collared widowbird, Euplectes ardens (A)
- Fan-tailed widowbird, Euplectes axillaris
- Long-tailed widowbird, Euplectes progne
- Grosbeak weaver, Amblyospiza albifrons

== Waxbills and allies ==
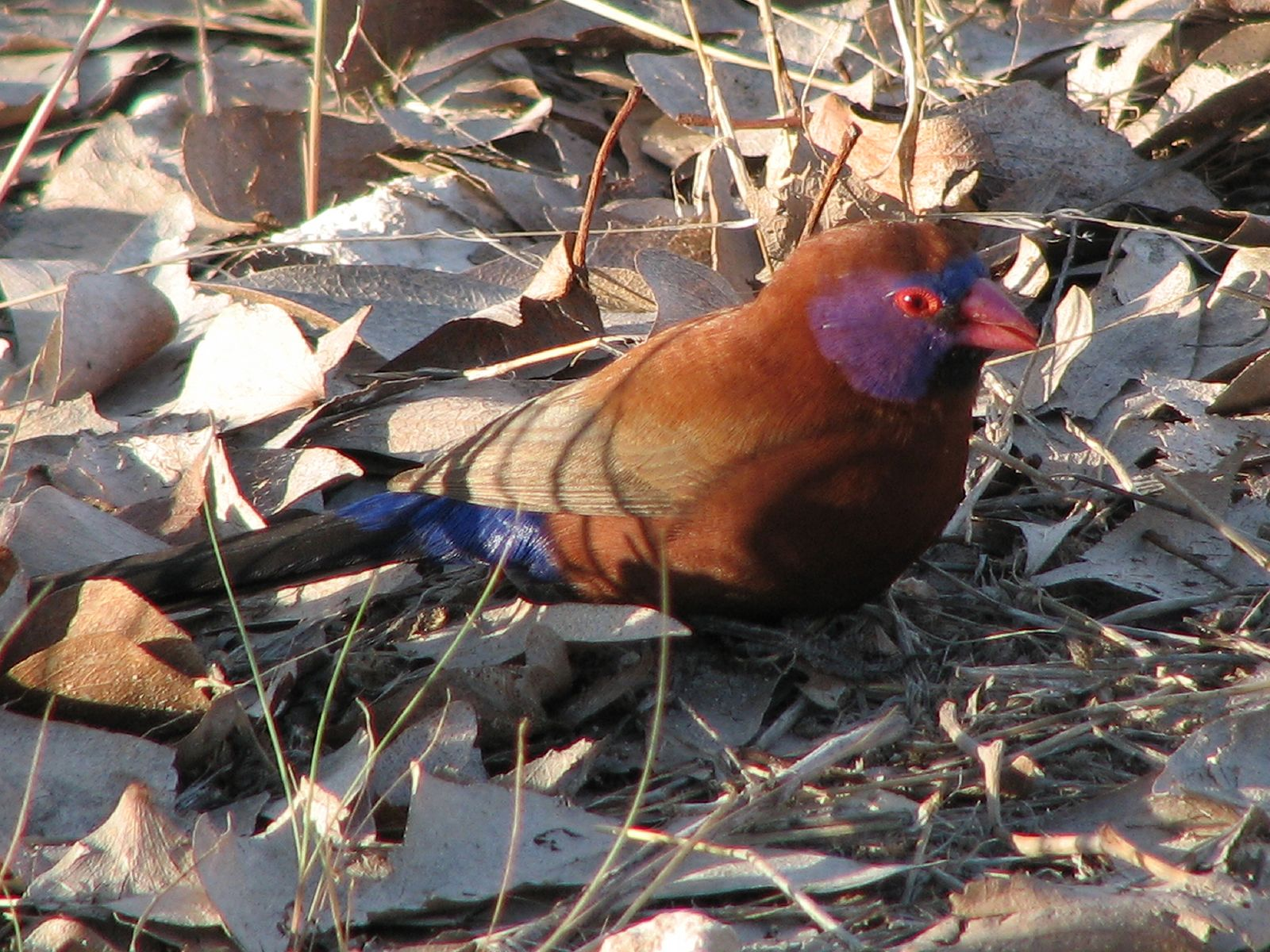
Violet-eared waxbill

Order: Passeriformes Family: Estrildidae

The estrildid finches are small passerine birds of the Old World tropics and Australasia. They are gregarious and often colonial seed eaters with short thick but pointed bills. They are all similar in structure and habits, but have wide variation in plumage colours and patterns.

- Bronze mannikin, Spermestes cucullata
- Magpie mannikin, Spermestes fringilloides (A)
- Black-faced waxbill, Brunhilda erythronotos
- Common waxbill, Estrilda astrild
- Quailfinch, Ortygospiza atricollis
- Locust finch, Paludipasser locustella (A)
- Cut-throat, Amadina fasciata
- Red-headed finch, Amadina erythrocephala
- Zebra waxbill, Amandava subflava (B)
- Violet-eared waxbill, Granatina granatina
- Southern cordonbleu, Uraeginthus angolensis
- Green-winged pytilia, Pytilia melba
- Orange-winged pytilia, Pytilia afra (B)
- Peters's twinspot, Hypargos niveoguttatus (A)
- Red-billed firefinch, Lagonosticta senegala
- Jameson's firefinch, Lagonosticta rhodopareia
- Brown firefinch, Lagonosticta nitidula

== Indigobirds ==
Order: Passeriformes Family: Viduidae

The indigobirds are finch-like species which usually have black or indigo predominating in their plumage. All are brood parasites, which lay their eggs in the nests of estrildid finches.

- Pin-tailed whydah, Vidua macroura
- Broad-tailed paradise-whydah, Vidua obtusa (B)
- Eastern paradise-whydah, Vidua paradisaea
- Shaft-tailed whydah, Vidua regia
- Village indigobird, Vidua chalybeata
- Purple indigobird, Vidua purpurascens
- Parasitic weaver, Anomalospiza imberbis (B)

== Old World sparrows ==
Order: Passeriformes Family: Passeridae

Sparrows are small passerine birds. In general, sparrows tend to be small, plump, brown or grey birds with short tails and short powerful beaks. Sparrows are seed eaters, but they also consume small insects.

- House sparrow, Passer domesticus (I)
- Great rufous sparrow, Passer motitensis
- Cape sparrow, Passer melanurus
- Northern gray-headed sparrow, Passer griseus (A)
- Southern gray-headed sparrow, Passer diffusus
- Yellow-throated bush sparrow, Gymnoris superciliaris

== Wagtails and pipits ==
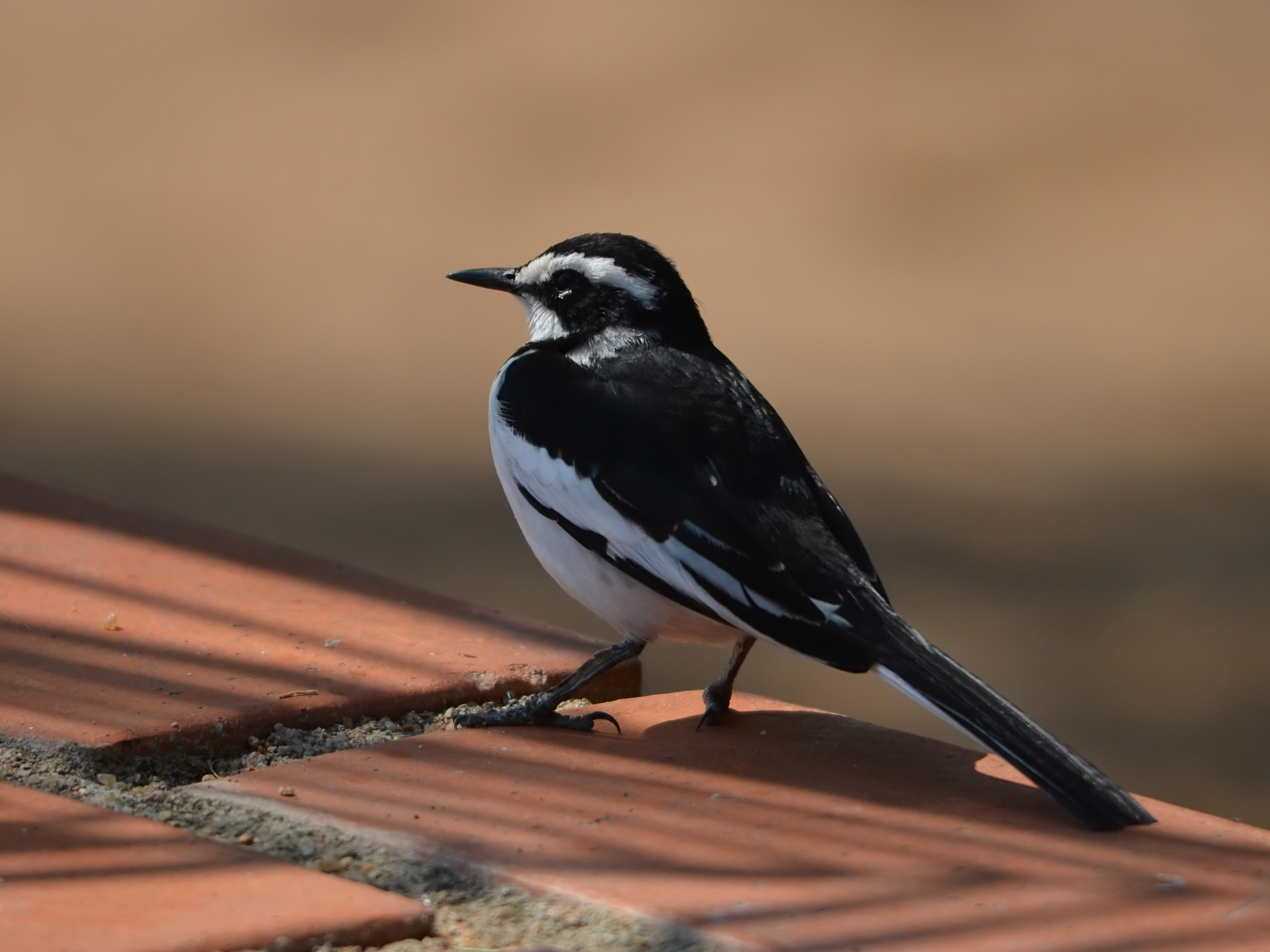
African pied wagtail

Order: Passeriformes Family: Motacillidae

Motacillidae is a family of small passerine birds with medium to long tails. They include the wagtails, longclaws, and pipits. They are slender ground-feeding insectivores of open country.

- Cape wagtail, Motacilla capensis
- Mountain wagtail, Motacilla clara (A)
- Gray wagtail, Motacilla cinerea (A)
- Western yellow wagtail, Motacilla flava
- African pied wagtail, Motacilla aguimp
- African pipit, Anthus cinnamomeus
- Mountain pipit, Anthus hoeschi
- Woodland pipit, Anthus nyassae (A)
- Nicholson's pipit, Anthus nicholsoni (B)
- Plain-backed pipit, Anthus leucophrys
- Buffy pipit, Anthus vaalensis
- Striped pipit, Anthus lineiventris (B)
- Tree pipit, Anthus trivialis
- Red-throated pipit, Anthus cervinus (A)
- Bush pipit, Anthus caffer (B)
- Orange-throated longclaw, Macronyx capensis (B)
- Rosy-throated longclaw, Macronyx ameliae

== Finches, euphonias, and allies ==
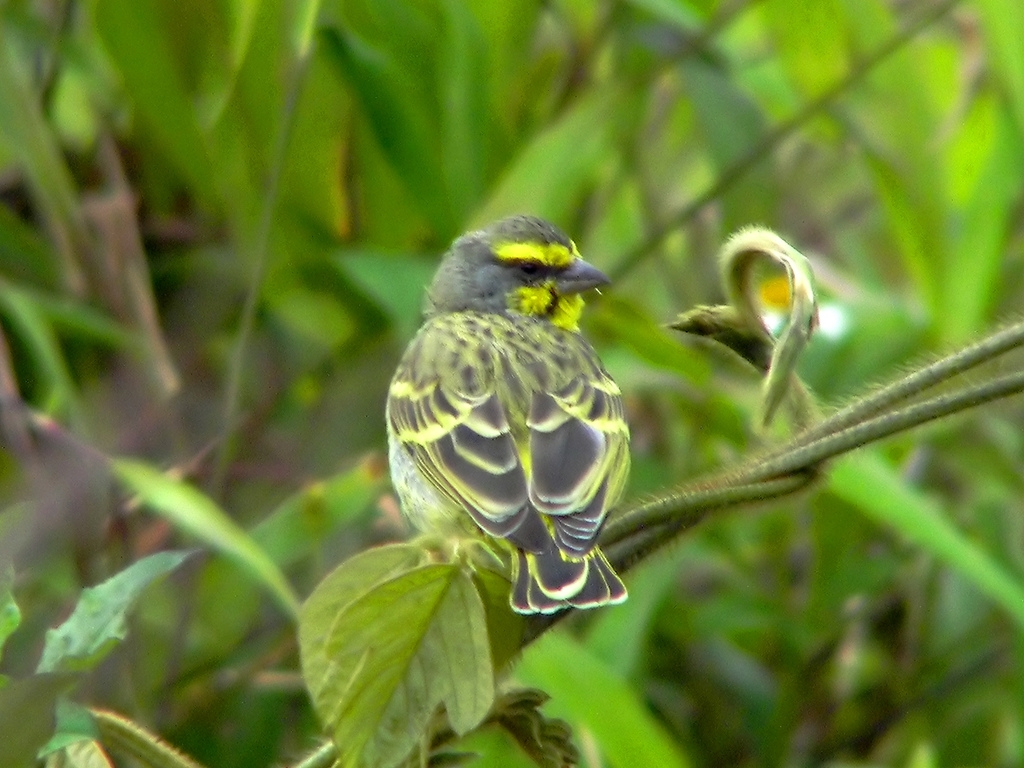
Yellow-fronted canary

Order: Passeriformes Family: Fringillidae

Finches are seed-eating passerine birds that are small to moderately large and have a strong beak, usually conical and in some species very large. All have twelve tail feathers and nine primaries. These birds have a bouncing flight with alternating bouts of flapping and gliding on closed wings, and most sing well.

- Yellow-fronted canary, Crithagra mozambica
- Black-throated canary, Crithagra atrogularis
- Yellow canary, Crithagra flaviventris
- Black-eared seedeater, Crithagra mennelli (A)
- Streaky-headed seedeater, Crithagra gularis (B)
- Cape canary, Serinus canicollis
- Black-headed canary, Serinus alario (A)

== Old World buntings ==
Order: Passeriformes Family: Emberizidae

The emberizids are a large family of passerine birds. They are seed-eating birds with distinctively shaped bills. Many emberizid species have distinctive head patterns.

- Golden-breasted bunting, Emberiza flaviventris
- Cape bunting, Emberiza capensis (A)
- Lark-like bunting, Emberiza impetuani
- Cinnamon-breasted bunting, Emberiza tahapisi

== See also ==
- Wildlife of Botswana
- List of birds
- Lists of birds by region
