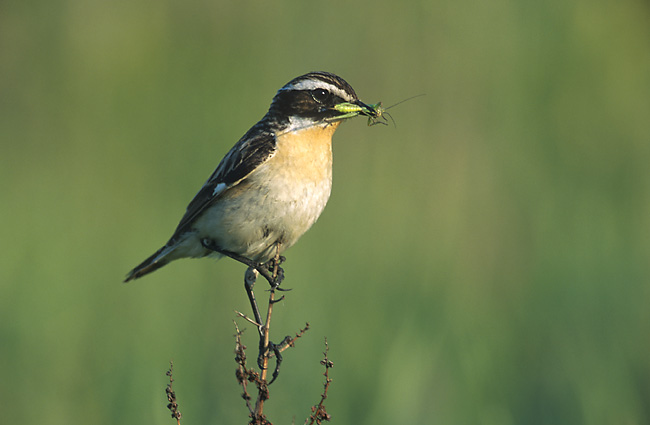
- Whinchat (Saxicola rubetra)

Scientific classification
- Kingdom: Animalia
- Phylum: Chordata
- Class: Aves
- Order: Passeriformes
- Family: Muscicapidae
- Subfamily: Saxicolinae; Vigors, 1825

Type genus
- Saxicola

Genera
- About 24, see text

= Chat (bird) =

Chats

Subfamily of birds

Chats (formerly sometimes known as "chat-thrushes") are a group of small Old World insectivorous birds formerly classified as members of the thrush family (Turdidae), but following genetic DNA analysis are now considered to belong to the Old World flycatcher family (Muscicapidae).

The name is normally applied to the more robust ground-feeding flycatchers found in Europe and Asia and most northern species are strong migrants. There are many genera and these birds in particular make up most of the subfamily Saxicolinae.

Other songbirds called "chats" are:

- Australian chats, genera Ashbyia and Epthianura of the honeyeater family (Meliphagidae). They belong to a more ancient lineage than Saxicolinae.
- American chats, genus Granatellus of the cardinal family (Cardinalidae), formerly placed in the wood-warbler family. They belong to a more modern lineage than Saxicolinae.
- Yellow-breasted chat (Icteria virens), an enigmatic North American songbird previously placed in the wood-warbler family (Parulidae) and now in the monotypic Icteriidae; its true relationships are unresolved.

== Taxonomy ==
The subfamily was introduced in 1825 by the Irish zoologist Nicholas Vigors with Saxicola as the type genus.

=== Genera ===
The subfamily formerly included fewer species. At the time of the publication of the third edition of the Howard and Moore Complete Checklist of the Birds of the World in 2003, the genera Myophonus, Brachypteryx and Heinrichia were included in the thrush family Turdidae. Subsequent molecular phylogenetic studies have shown that the species in these three genera are more closely related to species in Muscicapidae. As a consequence, these three genera are now placed here.

- Irania – single species: white-throated robin
- Luscinia – nightingales and relatives (4 species)
- Myiomela – robins (3 species)
- Calliope – rubythroats (5 species)
- Enicurus – forktails (8 species)
- Cinclidium – single species: blue-fronted robin
- Myophonus – whistling thrushes (9 species)
- Heinrichia – single species: great shortwing
- Vauriella – jungle flycatchers (4 species)
- Leonardina – single species: Bagobo babbler
- Brachypteryx – shortwings (10 species)
- Larvivora – East and South-East Asian robins (6 species)
- Ficedula – flycatchers (35 species)
- Tarsiger – bush robins and bluetails (8 species)
- Heteroxenicus – single species: Gould's shortwing
- Phoenicurus – redstarts (14 species)
- Monticola – rock thrushes (14 species)
- Saxicola – stonechats and chats (13 species)
- Campicoloides – single species: buff-streaked chat
- Emarginata – chats (3 species)
- Pinarochroa – single species: moorland chat
- Thamnolaea – single species: mocking cliff chat
- Myrmecocichla – chats (7 species)
- Oenanthe – wheatears (31 species)

The cladogram below is based on a molecular phylogenetic study by Min Zhao and collaborators that was published in 2023. Some regions of the phylogenetic tree were not strongly supported by the sequence data. Both the genera included and the number of species in each genera are taken from the AviList taxonomy.

- Saxicolinae
  - - - - Irania – white-throated robin
        - Luscinia – nightingales, redstart, bluethroat (4 species)
      - Calliope – rubythroats (5 species)
    - - - Enicurus – forktails (8 species)
        - - Cinclidium – blue-fronted robin
          - Myophonus – whistling thrushes (9 species)
      - - Myiomela – robins (3 species)
        - - - - Heinrichia – great shortwing
              - Vauriella – jungle flycatchers (4 species) & Leonardina – Bagobo babbler
            - - Brachypteryx – shortwings (10 species)
              - Larvivora – robins (8 species)
          - Ficedula – flycatchers (35 species)
  - - Tarsiger – bush robins, bluetails (8 species)
    - - Heteroxenicus – Gould's shortwing
      - - Phoenicurus – redstarts (14 species)
        - - Monticola – rock thrushes (14 species)
          - - Saxicola – bush chats, stonechats (13 species)
            - - - Campicoloides – buff-streaked chat
                - Emarginata – chats (3 species)
              - - - Pinarochroa – moorland chat
                  - Myrmecocichla – chats (7 species) & Thamnolaea – mocking cliff chat
                - Oenanthe – wheatears (31 species)
