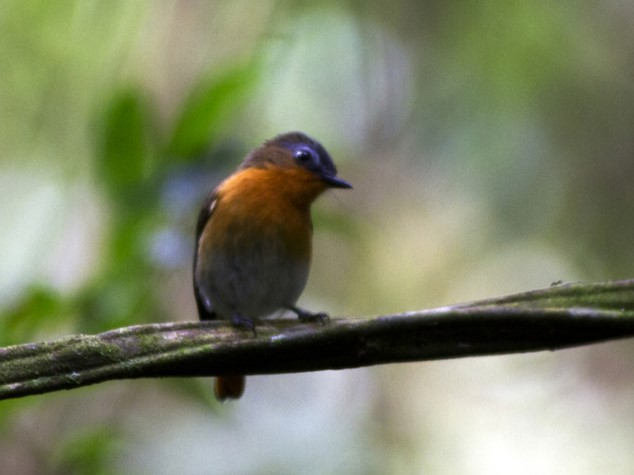

Conservation status
- Least Concern (IUCN 3.1)

Scientific classification
- Kingdom: Animalia
- Phylum: Chordata
- Class: Aves
- Order: Passeriformes
- Family: Muscicapidae
- Genus: Cossyphicula
- Species: C. roberti

Binomial name
- Cossyphicula roberti (Alexander, 1903)

= White-bellied robin-chat =

Species of bird

The white-bellied robin-chat (Cossyphicula roberti) is a species of bird in the Old World flycatcher family Muscicapidae. It is found across the Western High Plateau, Bioko and the Albertine Rift montane forests. Its natural habitats are subtropical or tropical moist lowland forest and subtropical or tropical moist montane forest.

A molecular phylogenetic study published in 2023 found that the white-bellied robin-chat was sister to the mountain robin-chat.
