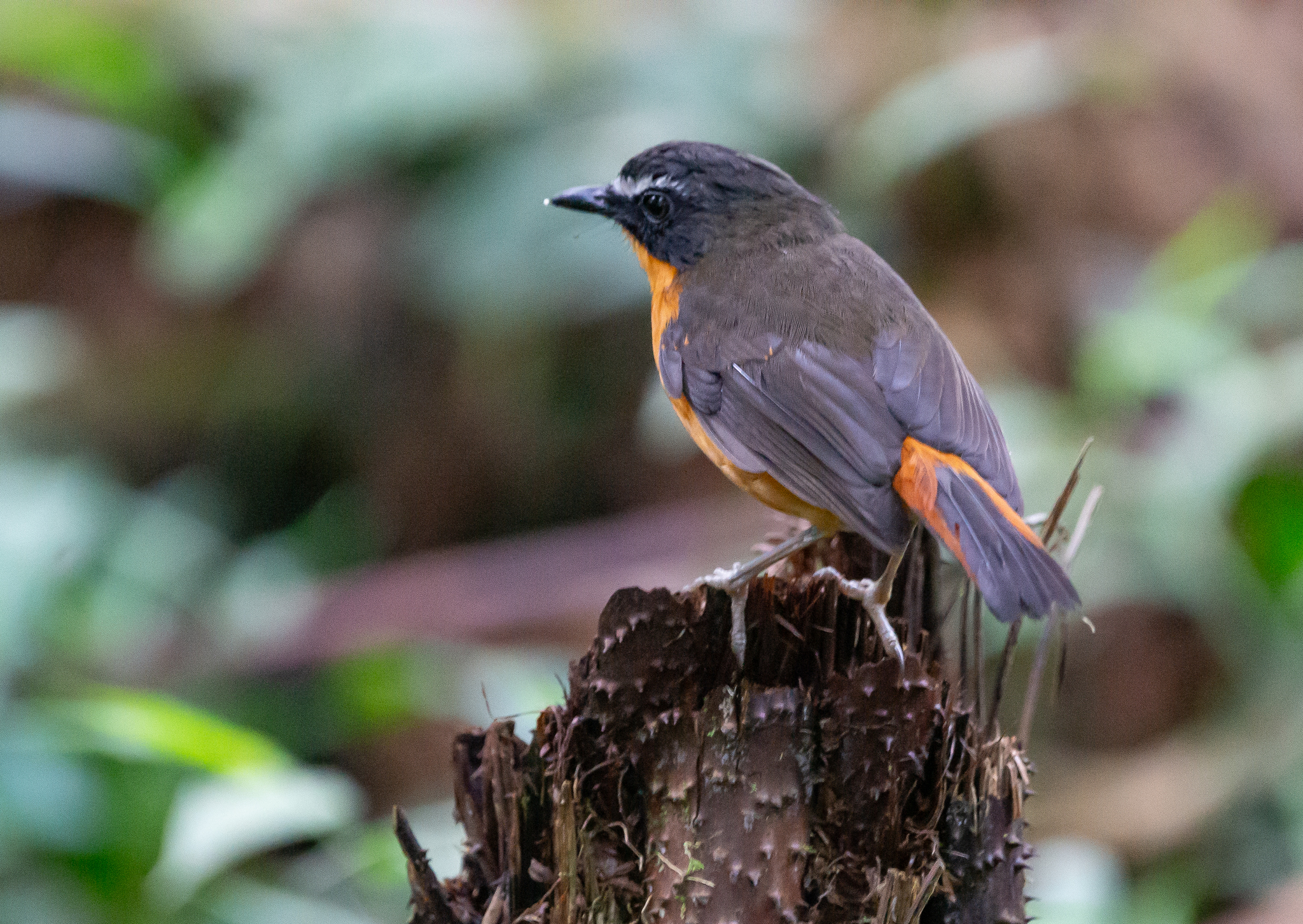

Conservation status
- Least Concern (IUCN 3.1)

Scientific classification
- Kingdom: Animalia
- Phylum: Chordata
- Class: Aves
- Order: Passeriformes
- Family: Muscicapidae
- Genus: Cossyphicula
- Species: C. isabellae

Binomial name
- Cossyphicula isabellae (GR Gray, 1862)

= Mountain robin-chat =

Species of bird

The mountain robin-chat (Cossyphicula isabellae) is a species of bird in the Old World flycatcher family Muscicapidae.

It is native to the Western High Plateau. Its natural habitat is subtropical or tropical moist montane forests.

A molecular phylogenetic study published in 2023 found that the mountain robin-chat was sister to the white-bellied robin-chat. Based on this result the mountain robin-chat was moved from the genus Cossypha to the genus Cossyphicula.
