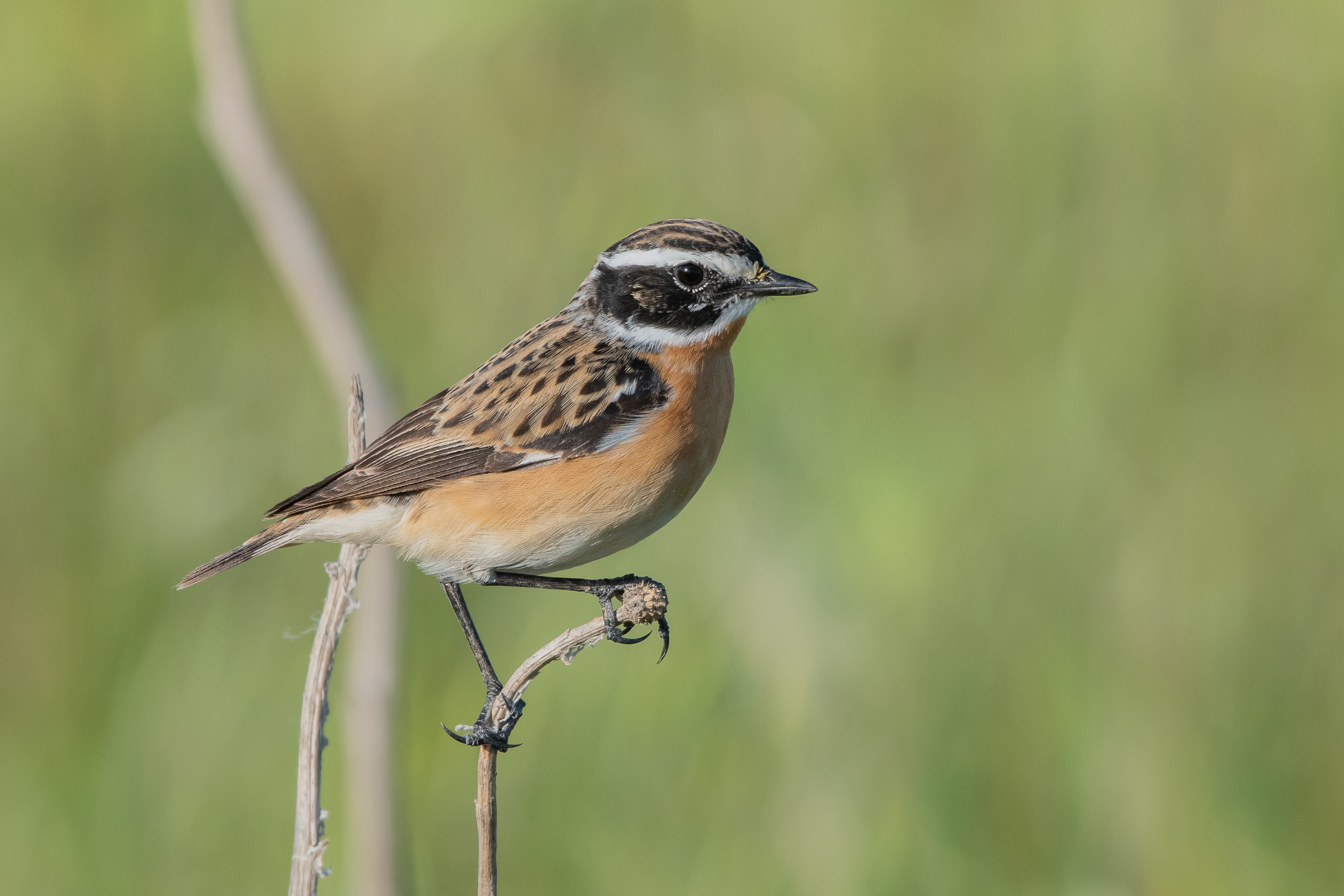
- Adult male in breeding plumage

Conservation status
- Least Concern (IUCN 3.1)

Scientific classification
- Kingdom: Animalia
- Phylum: Chordata
- Class: Aves
- Order: Passeriformes
- Family: Muscicapidae
- Genus: Saxicola
- Species: S. rubetra

Binomial name
- Saxicola rubetra (Linnaeus, 1758)
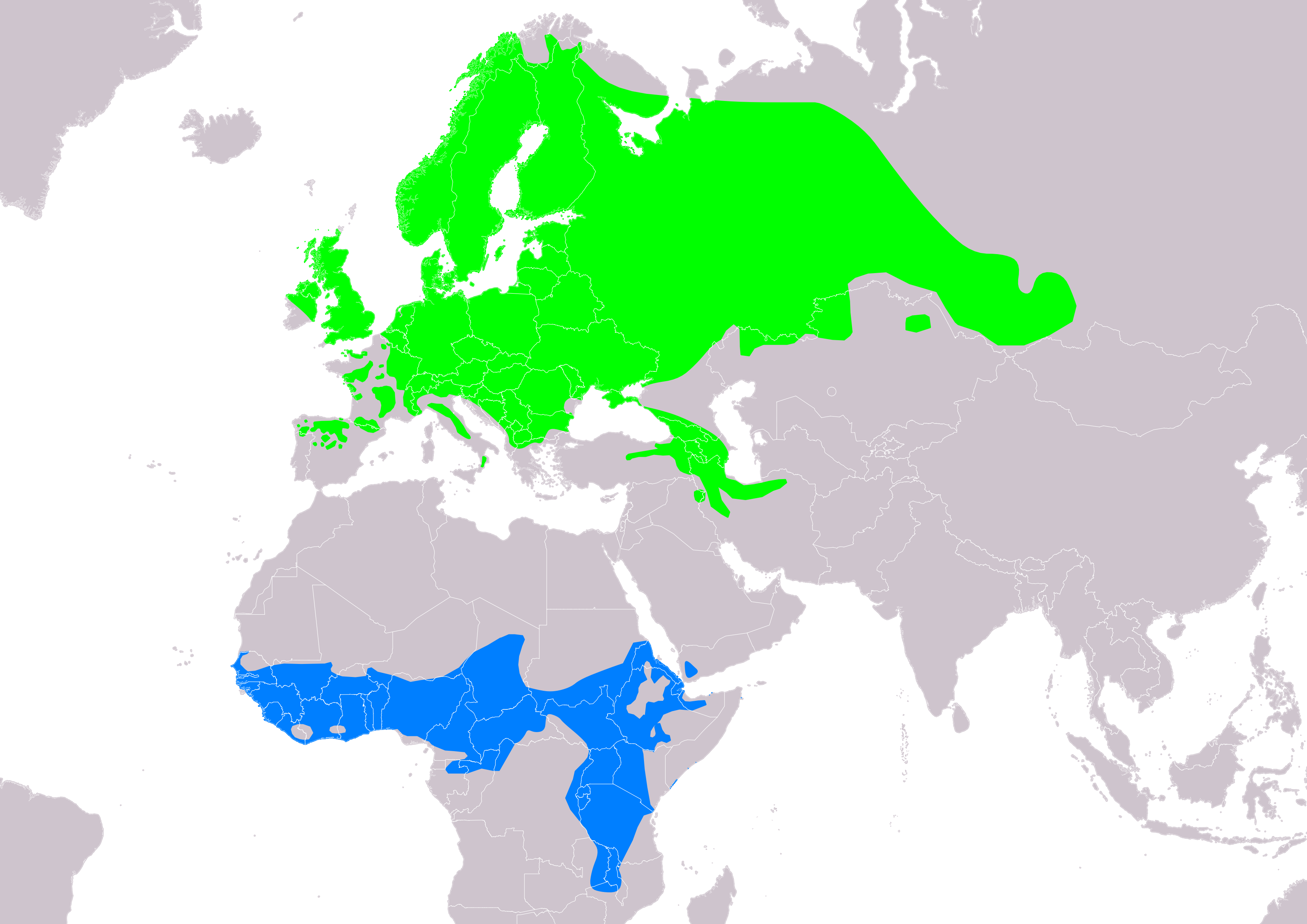
- Range of S. rubetra (Compiled by: BirdLife International and Handbook of the Birds of the World (2016) 2016.) Breeding Non-breeding

Synonyms
- Motacilla rubetra Linnaeus, 1758; Pratincola rubetra (Linnaeus)

Audio
- Song

= Whinchat =

Species of bird

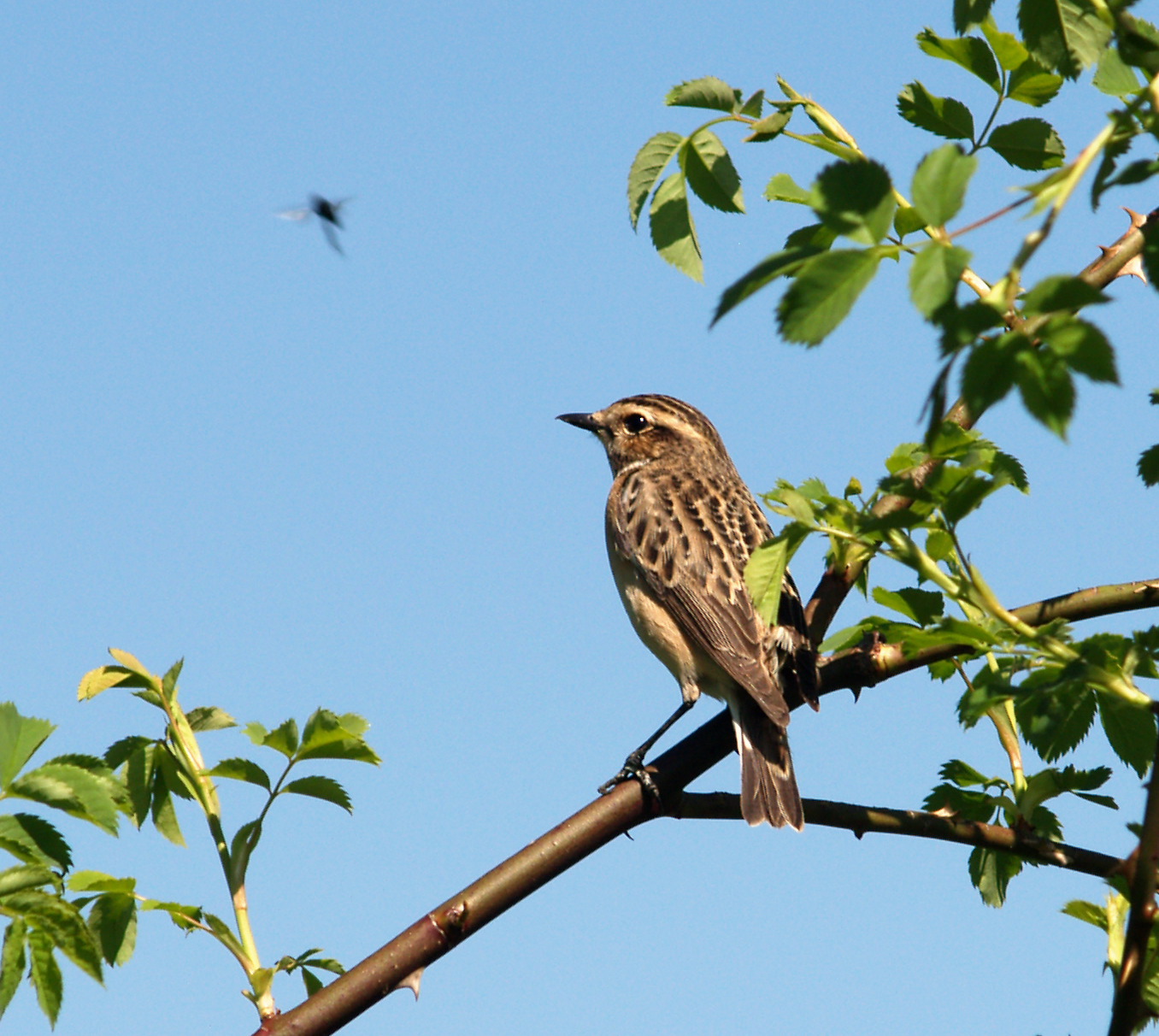
Adult female Chemnitz, Germany

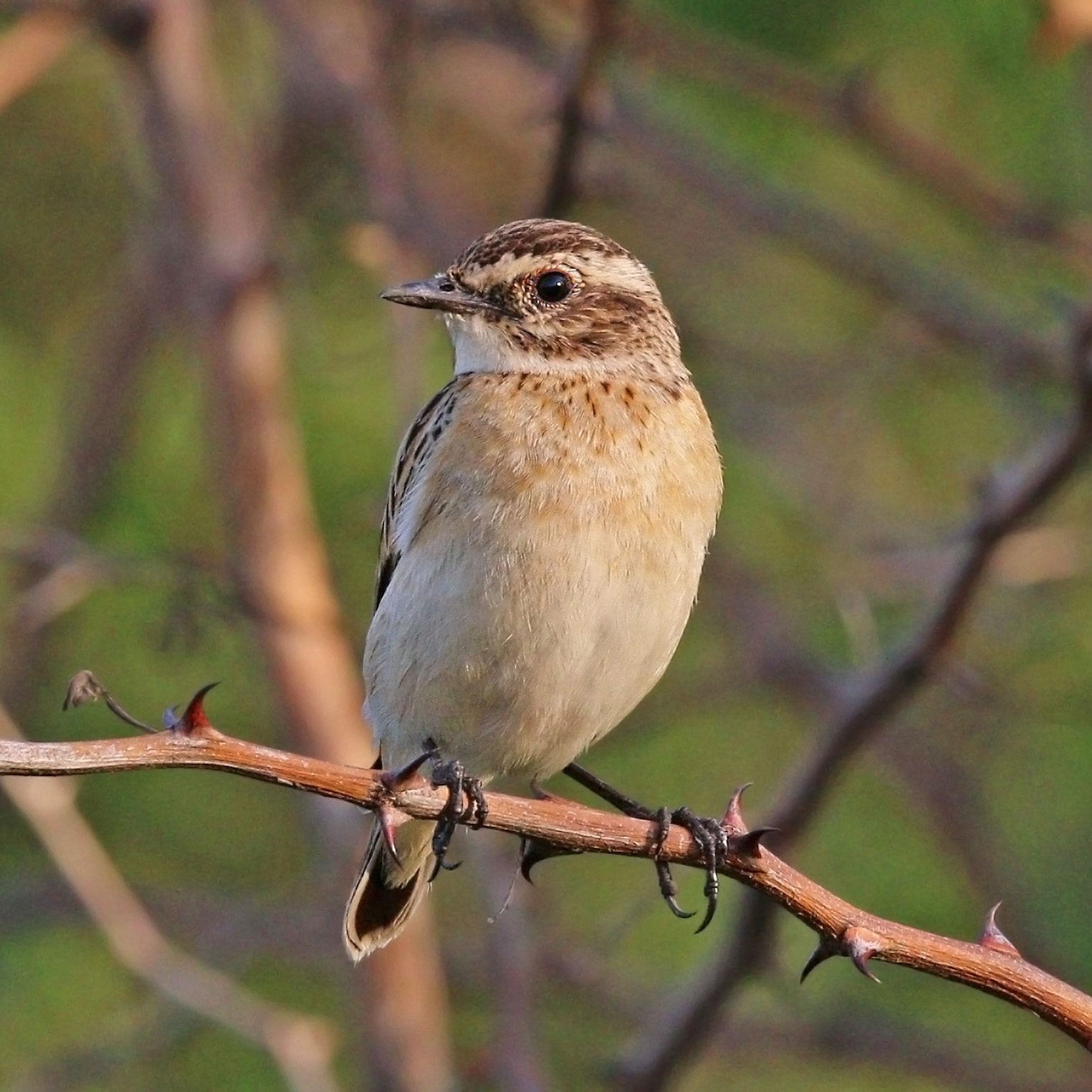
Adult female, Uganda

The whinchat (Saxicola rubetra) is a small migratory passerine bird breeding in Europe and western Asia and wintering in central Africa. At one time considered to be in the thrush family, Turdidae, it is now placed in the Old World flycatcher family, Muscicapidae. Both sexes have a strong supercilium, brownish upper parts mottled darker, a pale throat and breast, a pale buff to whitish belly, and a blackish tail with white bases to the outer tail feathers, but in the breeding season, the male has an orange-buff throat and breast.

The whinchat is a solitary species, favouring open grassy country with rough vegetation and scattered small shrubs. It perches in elevated locations ready to pounce on the insects and other small invertebrates that form its diet. The nest is built by the female on the ground in coarse vegetation, with a clutch of four to seven eggs being laid. The hen incubates the eggs for about thirteen days and then both parents feed the nestlings. Fledging takes place about eighteen days after hatching and the parents continue to feed the young for another fortnight. Moulting takes place in late summer before the migration southwards, and again on the wintering grounds in Africa before the migration northwards in spring. The whinchat is a common species with a wide range and the International Union for Conservation of Nature has classified it as being of "least concern".

== Taxonomy and systematics ==
The whinchat was formally described in 1758 by the Swedish naturalist Carl Linnaeus in the tenth edition of his Systema Naturae. He placed it in the genus Motacilla and coined the binomial name Motacilla rubetra. The whinchat is now one of 15 chats placed in the genus Saxicola that was introduced by the German naturalist Johann Matthäus Bechstein in 1802. The English name is derived from whin, the common gorse and chat referring to the nature of its calls. Its scientific name means "small rock-dweller", in reference to its habitat. Saxicola derives from Latin saxum ("rock") + incola ("dwelling"); rubetra is a Latin term for a small bird. No subspecies are recognised.

This species represents a fairly basal divergence of the genus Saxicola. It retains the supercilium found in many Muscicapidae but lost in the more derived Saxicola species such as the European stonechat or African stonechat (S. torquatus). As with other species of Saxicola, it was formerly considered a member of the thrush family (Turdidae), but is now placed in the Old World flycatcher family Muscicapidae. It, and similar thrush-like Muscicapidae species, are often called chats.

Very rarely, hybridisation occurs between the whinchat and the Siberian stonechat (Saxicola maurus), with a case being reported in Finland in 1997. It has also been reported to hybridise with the European stonechat in western and southern Europe.

== Description ==
The whinchat is a short-tailed bird, moving on the ground with small, rapid hops and frequently bobbing and flicking its wings and tail. It is similar in size to its relative the European robin (Erithacus rubecula), being 12 to 14 cm (4.7 to 5.5 in) long and weighing 13 to 26 g (0.46 to 0.92 oz). Both sexes have brownish upperparts mottled darker, a buff throat and breast, a pale buff to whitish belly, and a blackish tail with white bases to the outer tail feathers.

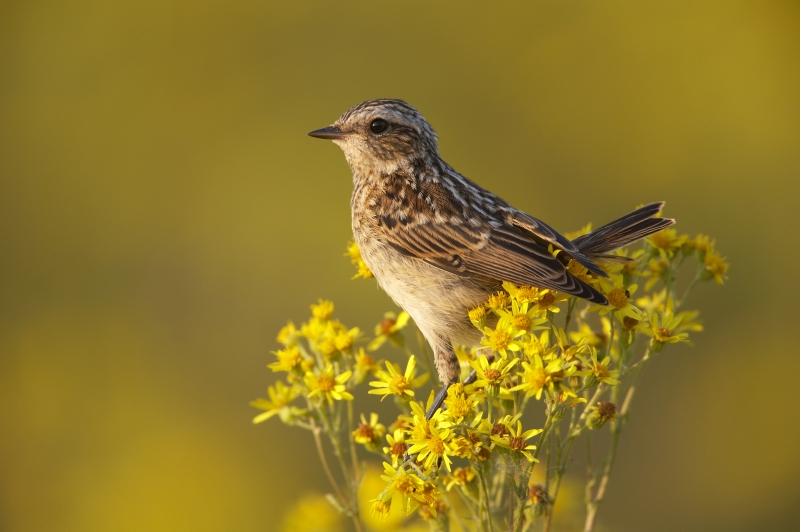
Juvenile whinchat

The male in breeding plumage has a blackish face mask almost encircled by a strong white supercilium and malar stripe, a bright orange-buff throat and breast, and small white wing patches on the greater coverts and inner median coverts. The female is duller overall, in particular having browner face mask, pale buffy-brown breast, and a buff supercilium and malar stripe, and smaller or no white wing patches. Males in immature and winter plumage are similar to females, except that adult males retain the white wing patches all year round.

Though fairly similar to females and immatures of the European stonechat (S. rubicola), the whinchat can readily be distinguished by its conspicuous supercilium and whiter belly, and also in western Europe, by being paler overall than the western European stonechat subspecies S. rubicola hibernans. It also differs structurally in being slightly slimmer and less 'dumpy', and having longer wingtips (an adaptation to its long-distance migration). It is more easily confused with female or immature Siberian stonechat (S. maura), which (also being a long-distance migrant) shares the longer wingtips; however, Siberian stonechat can be distinguished by its conspicuous unmarked pale orange-buff rump (in whinchat, the rump is the same mottled brown colour as the back).

Its main call is described as a hue-tac-tac, the 'tac' softer and less grating than that of the European stonechat; the call is used both for contact between birds and predator alarms. The male has a whistling, crackly but soft song used during the breeding season, consisting of a mixture of soft whistles, tacs and more grating sounds; it is often mimetic, including phrases from the songs of at least 12 other assorted bird species. It sings from a fence, bush, tree or wire, or occasionally from the ground or in flight, between about April and July. On the wintering grounds, it often gives alarm calls but only occasionally sings, being most likely to do so at the end of winter, when starting spring migration.

== Distribution and habitat ==
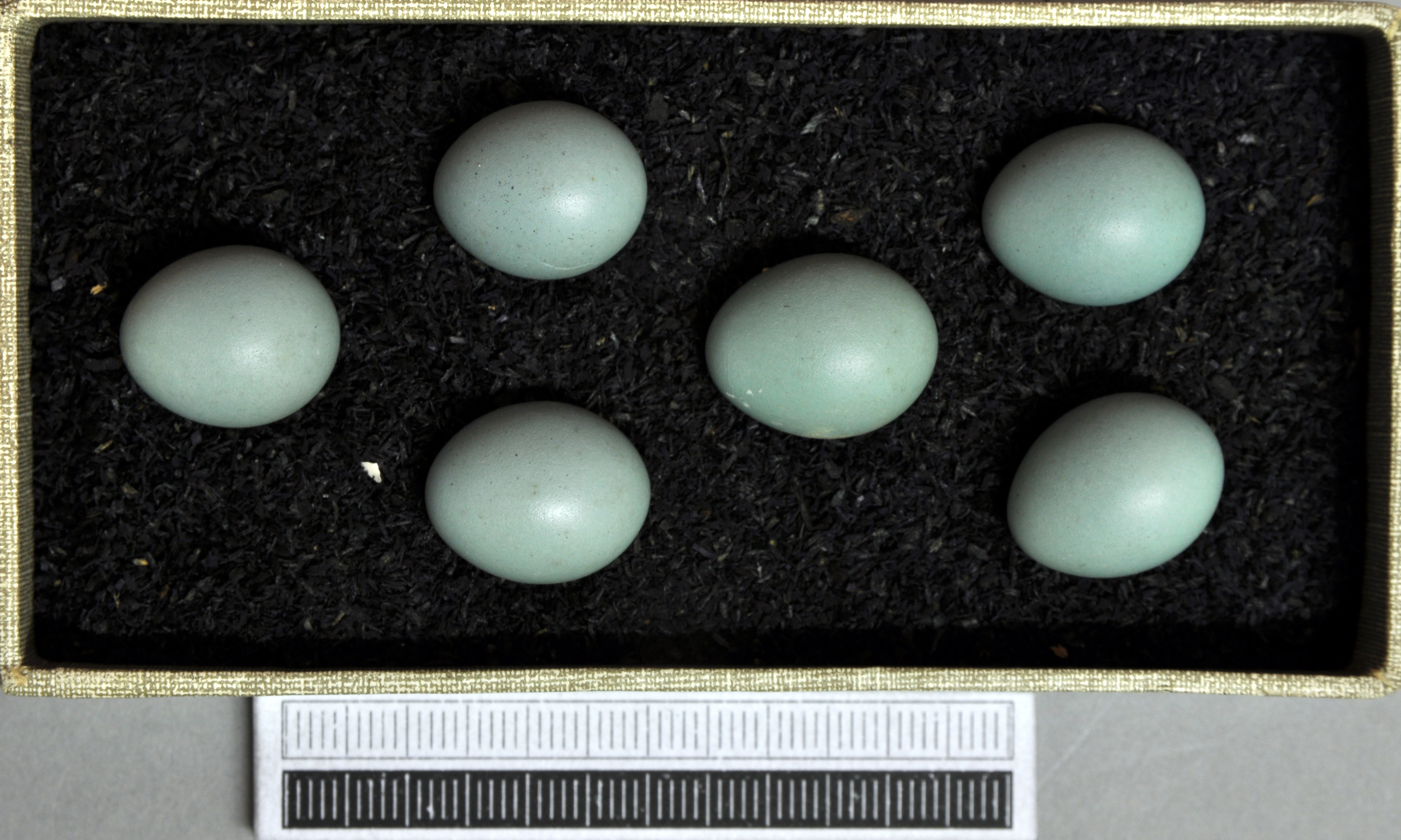
Eggs, Collection Museum Wiesbaden

The whinchat is a migratory species breeding in Europe and western Asia from Ireland and northern Portugal east to the Ob River basin near Novosibirsk, and from northern Norway south to central Spain, central Italy, northern Greece, and the Caucasus Mountains.

Birds arrive on the breeding grounds between the end of April and mid-May, and depart between mid-August and mid-September (odd birds lingering to October). They winter primarily in tropical sub-Saharan Africa from Senegal east to Kenya and south to Zambia, arriving in western Africa at the start of the dry season in late September to November, and leaving between February and March. Small numbers also winter in northwestern Africa in Morocco, northern Algeria and Tunisia. Available stopover sites are important for the successful migration of whinchat between Africa and Europe, where they face the barriers of the Sahara and Mediterranean Sea. Vagrants have reached northwest of the breeding range to Iceland, west on migration to the Canary Islands and Cape Verde, and south of the wintering range to northern South Africa.

During the breeding season in the UK, at the landscape-scale, whinchats favour habitats with high plant species richness and steeper slopes. However, at the territory scale, low-elevation areas with a heterogeneous vegetation structure and high density of perches and tussocks are preferred.

Whinchats wintering in Nigeria have a large breeding range that spreads across continental Europe indicating low connectivity, arising from wide migratory dispersal, with high mixing of breeding populations during the non-breeding season. A lone vagrant was sighted for the first time in India by birder R. Mohammed Saleem during their Great Indian Bird Expedition SEEK2019 at Chambal National Park.

== Behaviour and ecology ==
Typical behaviour

The whinchat is a largely solitary bird though it may form small family groups in autumn. It favours rough low vegetation habitats such as open rough pasture or similar minimally cultivated grassland with scattered small shrubs such as hawthorn (Crataegus monogyna), and bracken (Pteridium aquilinum) or heather (Calluna vulgaris) stands on rock-strewn ground. It also commonly inhabits new and clear-felled conifer plantations until the new tree crop is about five to six years old and a metre or two tall. It always needs at least a few perching points (shrubs, tall weeds, or fence posts) to scan from for food and for use as song posts.

Breeding takes place in late April and May. The nest is built solely by the female, and is made of dried grasses and moss, and lined with hairs and fine bents. It is built on the ground, hidden in dense low vegetation, often at the foot of a bush. The female lays and incubates a clutch of four to seven eggs which hatch after eleven to fourteen days. Both parents bring food to the young which leave the nest ten to fourteen days later, while still too young to fly. The chicks fledge at seventeen to nineteen days after hatching and remain largely dependent on the parents for a further two weeks. Whinchats are short-lived, typically only surviving two years, to a maximum recorded of just over five years in the wild; breeding starts when birds are a year old. Predators include weasels, stoats, and small raptors such as the merlin and nest predators such as crows and magpies. Nests are also lost due to agricultural operations such as silage cutting (the main factor in the species' decline in western Europe) or trampling by livestock, and are sometimes parasitised by the common cuckoo.

Whinchats are insectivorous, feeding largely (about 80–90%) on insects, but also consume a wide range of other invertebrates including spiders, small snails and worms. They also eat small amounts of fruit such as blackberries, primarily in autumn. The birds like to perch on elevated spots such as shrubs, from where they make sallies to catch insects, mostly taken off the ground, but also flying insects. While so perched, males in particular frequently flick their tail and sometimes their wings to show the white tail and wing flashes, for display or territorial communication signals to other whinchats.

Adult whinchats have a single complex complete moult in late summer (late July onward) after breeding and mainly completed before southbound migration. Juveniles have a partial moult at the same time, growing new body feathering but retaining the flight feathers. All ages also have a partial moult in early spring on the wintering grounds before northbound migration.

== Status and conservation ==
Fairly common across its wide range, the whinchat is classified as a species of "least concern" by the International Union for Conservation of Nature. Some populations are however in serious decline, particularly in the west of its range in Britain, Ireland, France, Belgium, the Netherlands, Denmark, and Germany, primarily due to agricultural intensification. In Britain it is amber-listed with an unfavourable conservation status; it had all but disappeared from former lowland breeding areas in the south and east between surveys in 1968–72 and 1988–91, remaining common only in upland areas of the north and west where low-intensity livestock rearing is the main land use. There has been a similar decline in Ireland, where it is now classified as "rare".
