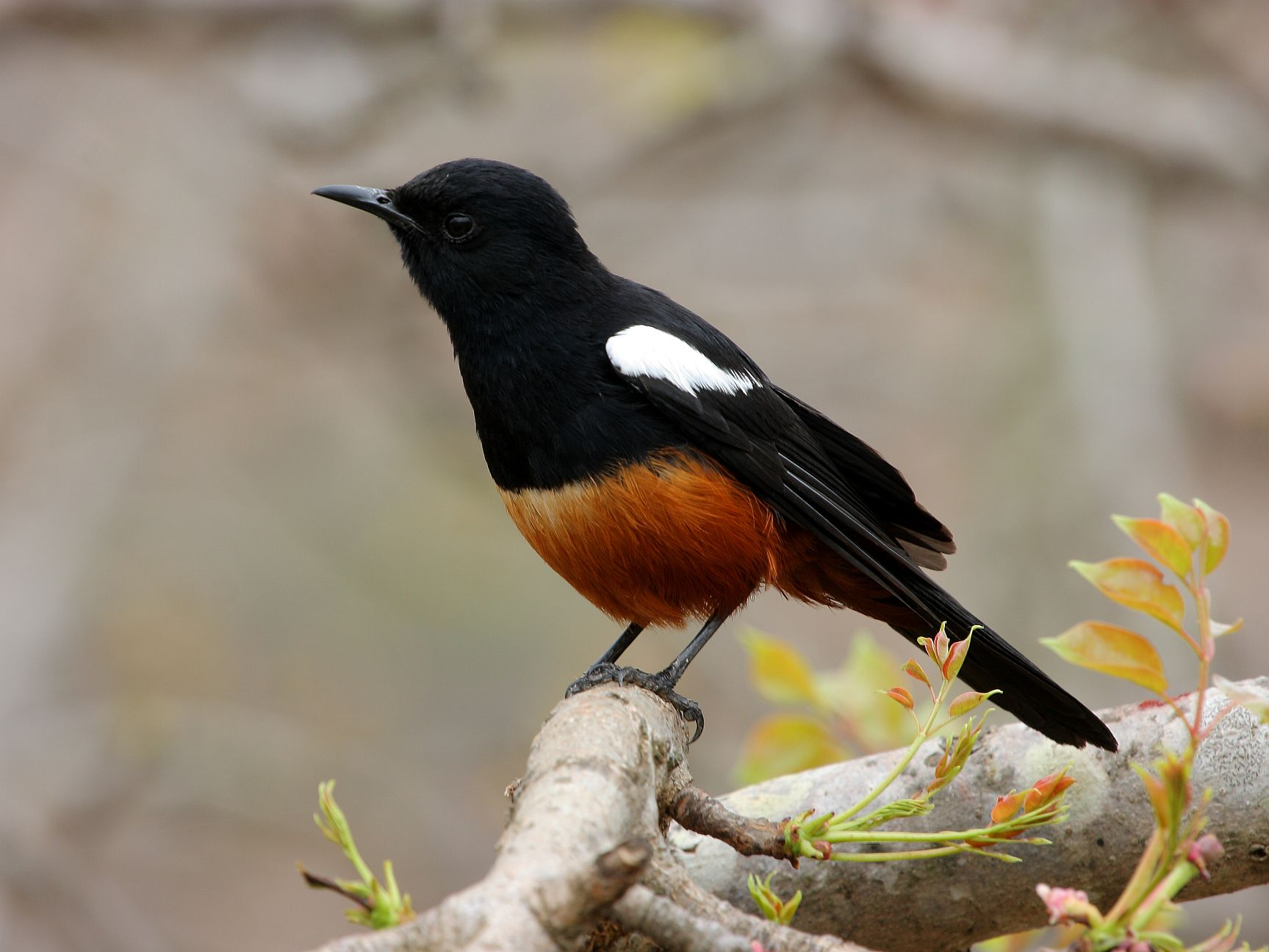
- Male in South Africa
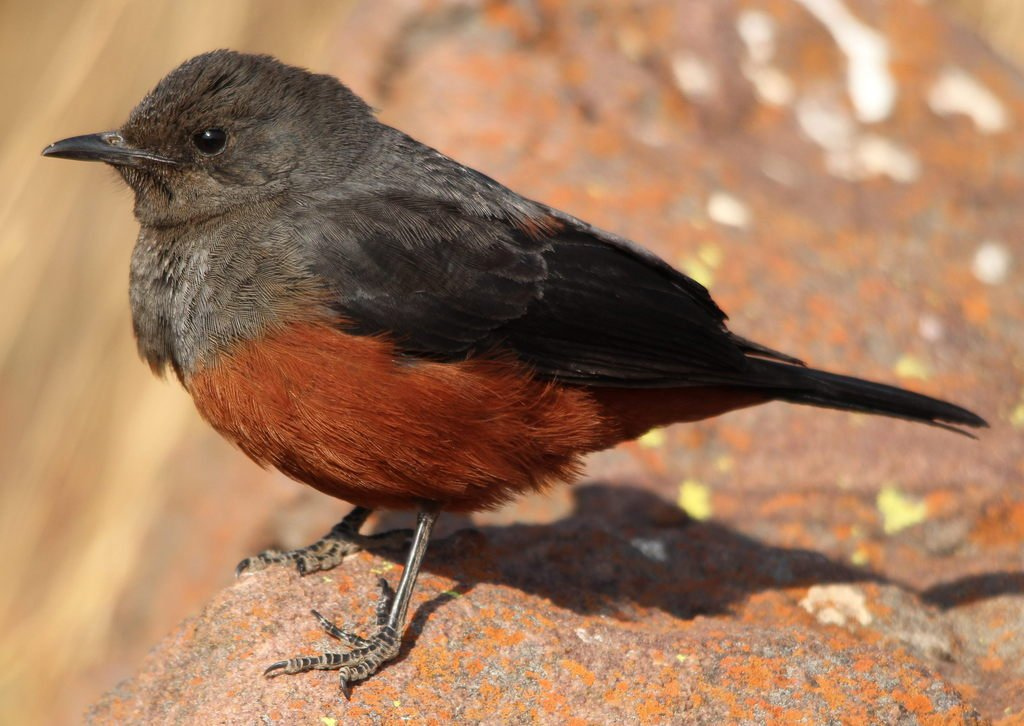
- Female in South Africa

Conservation status
- Least Concern (IUCN 3.1)

Scientific classification
- Kingdom: Animalia
- Phylum: Chordata
- Class: Aves
- Order: Passeriformes
- Family: Muscicapidae
- Genus: Thamnolaea
- Species: T. cinnamomeiventris

Binomial name
- Thamnolaea cinnamomeiventris (Lafresnaye, 1836)

Synonyms
- Myrmecocichla cinnamomeiventris Lafresnaye, 1836

= Mocking cliff chat =

Species of bird

The mocking cliff chat, mocking chat or cliff chat, (Thamnolaea cinnamomeiventris) is a species of chat in the family Muscicapidae which occurs in rocky habitats in much of eastern Sub-Saharan Africa. It is the only species placed in the genus Thamnolaea.

== Taxonomy ==
The mocking cliff chat was formally described and illustrated in 1836 by the French ornithologist Frédéric de Lafresnaye based on a specimen that had been sent to France from the Cape of Good Hope in South Africa. Lafresnaye placed the species with the thrushes in the genus Turdus and coined the binomial name Turdus cinnamomeiventris. The specific epithet combines Modern Latin cinnamomeus meaning "cinnamon-coloured" with Latin venter, ventris meaning "belly". The type locality has been designated as Cape Province. The mocking cliff chat is now the only species placed in the genus Thamnolaea that was introduced in 1851 by the German ornithologist Jean Cabanis. The genus name combines the Ancient Greek θαμνος/thamnos meaning "bush" with λαιος/laios meaning "thrush".

Nine subspecies are recognised:

- T. c. cavernicola Bates, GL, 1933 – central Mali
- T. c. bambarae Bates, GL, 1928 – south Mauritania, east Senegal and southwest Mali
- T. c. albiscapulata (Rüppell, 1837) – north Eritrea, north, central, east Ethiopia
- T. c. subrufipennis Reichenow, 1887 – southeast Sudan and southwest Ethiopia south to Zambia and Malawi
- T. c. odica Clancey, 1962 – east Zimbabwe
- T. c. cinnamomeiventris (Lafresnaye, 1836) – east Botswana, east South Africa, west Eswatini (formerly Swaziland) and Lesotho
- T. c. autochthones Clancey, 1952 – south Mozambique, northeast South Africa and east Eswatini (formerly Swaziland)
- T. c. coronata Reichenow, 1902 – north Ivory Coast and Burkina Faso to west Sudan
- T. c. kordofanensis Wettstein, 1916 – central Sudan

Subspecies T. c. coronata together with T. c. kordofanensis have sometimes been considered as a separate species, the white-crowned cliff chat.

== Description ==
The mocking cliff chat is a large chat with distinctive colouration. The male has a glossy black with a chestnut belly, vent, and rump and white shoulder patches. The shoulder patches vary in size geographically. The female is dark grey with a chestnut lower breast, belly, and vent. The mocking cliff chat has a length of 19–21 cm and weigh 41–51g.

=== Voice ===
A song containing phrases mimicking other species, interspersed with other phrases.

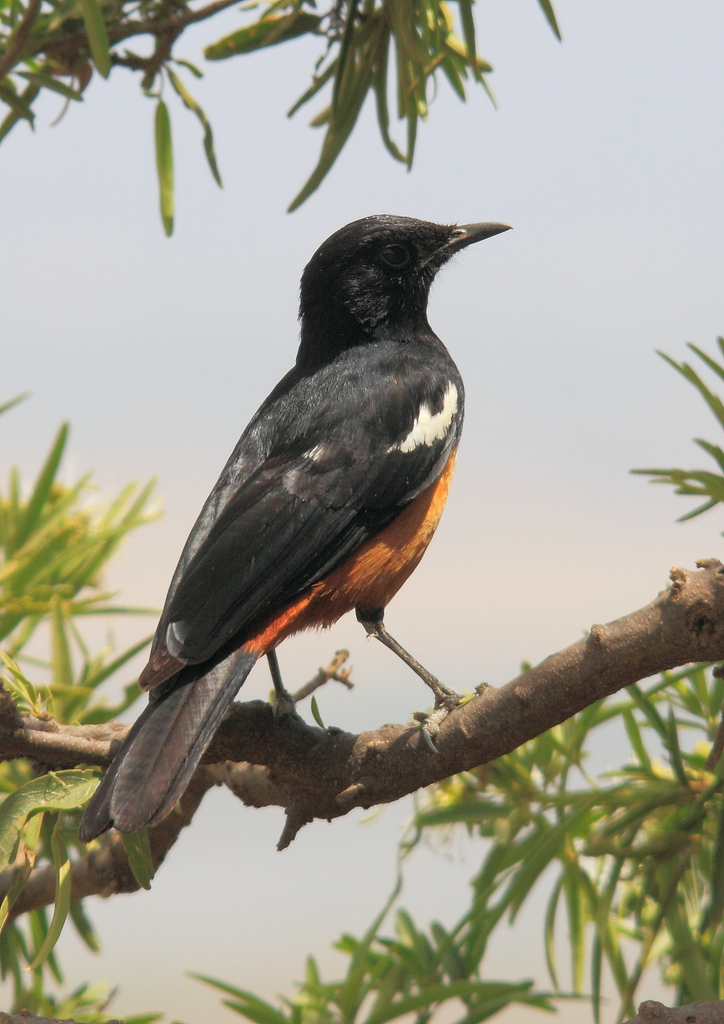
T. c. subrufipennis in Kenya

== Distribution and habitat ==
The mocking cliff chat occurs in a neat band from central Ethiopia in the north through east Africa into Zimbabwe, south-eastern Botswana, southern Mozambique and eastern South Africa as far as the far east of Western Cape province. Mostly resident but in the south of its range tends to move to lower altitudes in the winter months. It inhabits rocky and boulder strewn areas, well-wooded rocky ravines, cliffs, gullies, boulder-strewn hillsides and watercourses in valley bottoms with scattered rocks.

== Behaviour ==
=== Food and feeding ===
The mocking cliff chat is mainly insectivorous but also eats fruit and feeds on the nectar of aloes, such as the Krantz aloe, Aloe arborescens. Its chief foraging technique is to pounce on food on the ground from a perch but it will also glean food from branches and foliage. They habitually wag their tails, slowly raising it over their backs and fanning it out.

=== Breeding ===
Both sexes build the nest, taking about a week to construct an open cup built over a foundation of twigs, leaves, roots and feathers and lined with the hair of mammals. They often use the nests of striped swallows frequently evicting the swallows while they are still using the nest. The nest is usually positioned below a rock overhang, bridge, culvert or in a cave and it may sometimes be placed in a hole in a wall or in a cavity in agricultural machinery. In southern Africa the eggs are laid from August–December, with a peak during September–November. The normal clutch size is 2-4 eggs, which the female incubates for about 14–16 days. Both parents feed the chicks which fledge at about three weeks old.
