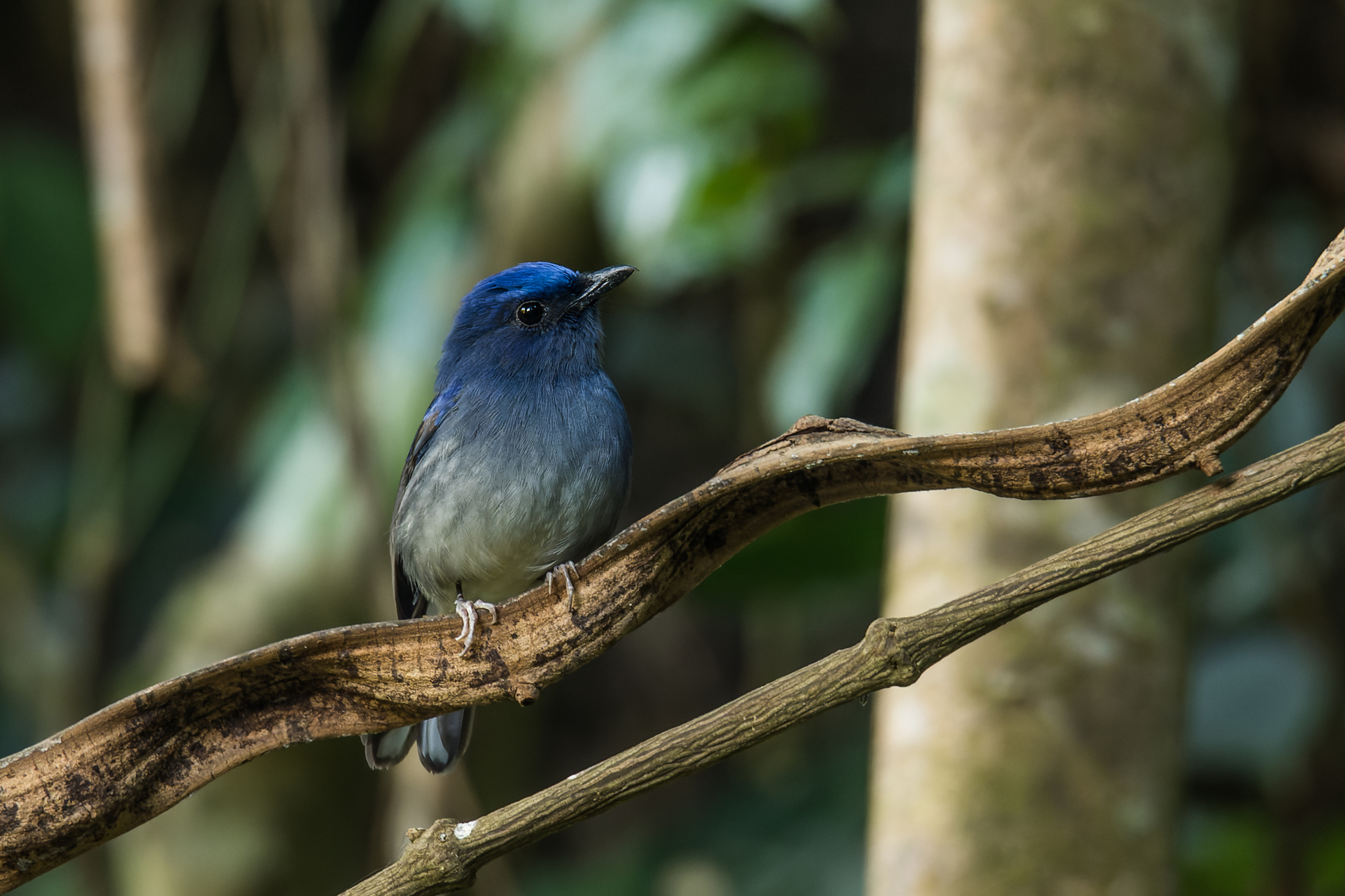

Conservation status
- Least Concern (IUCN 3.1)

Scientific classification
- Kingdom: Animalia
- Phylum: Chordata
- Class: Aves
- Order: Passeriformes
- Family: Muscicapidae
- Genus: Leucoptilon; Sangster et al., 2021
- Species: L. concretum

Binomial name
- Leucoptilon concretum (Müller, 1836)

Synonyms
- Muscicapa concreta Müller, 1836 (protonym); Cyornis concretus

= White-tailed flycatcher =

Species of bird

The white-tailed flycatcher (Leucoptilon concretum) is a species of bird in the family Muscicapidae. It is the only member of the monotypic genus Leucoptilon. It is found in submountain forests from the eastern Himalayas and northern Myanmar to southern China, western and southern Thailand, the Malay Peninsula, Sumatra and Borneo.

== Taxonomy ==
The white-tailed flycatcher was formally described in 1836 by the German naturalist Salomon Müller based on a specimen collected in the interior of the west coast of Sumatra. Müller placed the species in the genus Muscicapa and coined the binomial name Muscicapa concreta. The specific epithet concretum is from Modern Latin concretus meaning "large", "sturdy" or "strong". It comes from Medieval Latin concretus meaning "concrete". The white-tailed flycatcher was previously assigned to the genus Cyornis but based on evidence from molecular phylogenetic studies the species is now placed in its own monotypic genus Leucoptilon that was introduced in 2021 by George Sangster and collaborators. The genus name combines the Ancient Greek λευκος/leukos meaning "white" with πτιλον/ptilon meaning "feather".

Three subspecies are recognised:

- L. c. cyaneum (Hume, 1877) – northeast India to north Indochina and south Thailand
- L. c. concretum (Müller, S, 1836) – Malay Peninsula and Sumatra
- L. c. everetti (Sharpe, 1890) – Borneo

Its natural habitats are subtropical or tropical moist lowland forests and subtropical or tropical moist montane forests.
