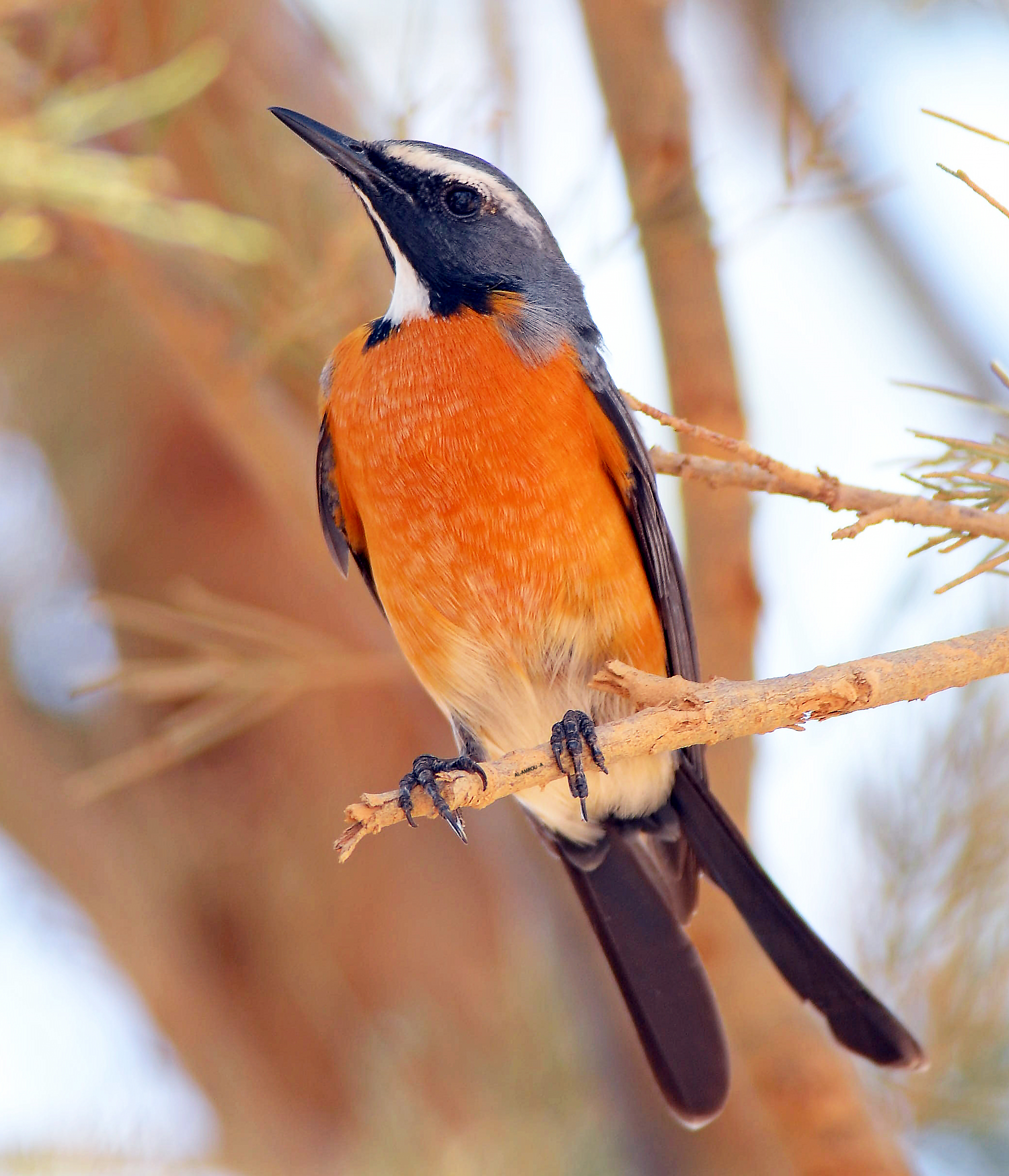
- Adult male in Saudi Arabia

Conservation status
- Least Concern (IUCN 3.1)

Scientific classification
- Kingdom: Animalia
- Phylum: Chordata
- Class: Aves
- Order: Passeriformes
- Family: Muscicapidae
- Genus: Irania de Filippi, 1863
- Species: I. gutturalis

Binomial name
- Irania gutturalis (Guérin-Méneville, 1843)

Synonyms
- Bessornis albigularis

= White-throated robin =

Species of bird

The white-throated robin or irania (Irania gutturalis) is a small, migratory passerine bird in the Old World flycatcher family Muscicapidae, and the only member of the genus Irania. It breeds on high-altitude mountain slopes with dense scrub in western Asia and winters in East Africa. Males have lead-grey upperparts and bright orange underparts with a namesake white throat patch. Females are duller, with greyer underparts, orange sides, and a fainter white throat compared to the males.

== Taxonomy ==
The vernacular and generic name Irania alludes to Iran, its type locality, while the specific name gutturalis is Medieval Latin for "of the throat", referring to the male's white throat.

The white-throated robin belongs to a group of passerines called chats, which were, as traditionally defined, all formerly thought to be members of the thrush family Turdidae, but are now classified as Old World flycatchers, Muscicapidae. Within the Muscicapidae family, the chats (as traditionally defined) make up the subfamily Saxicolinae, together with other species that were not traditionally labeled as chats/thrushes, such as the Ficedula flycatchers. The white-throated robin is sister to the genus Luscinia, containing the nightingales and their relatives.

== Description ==
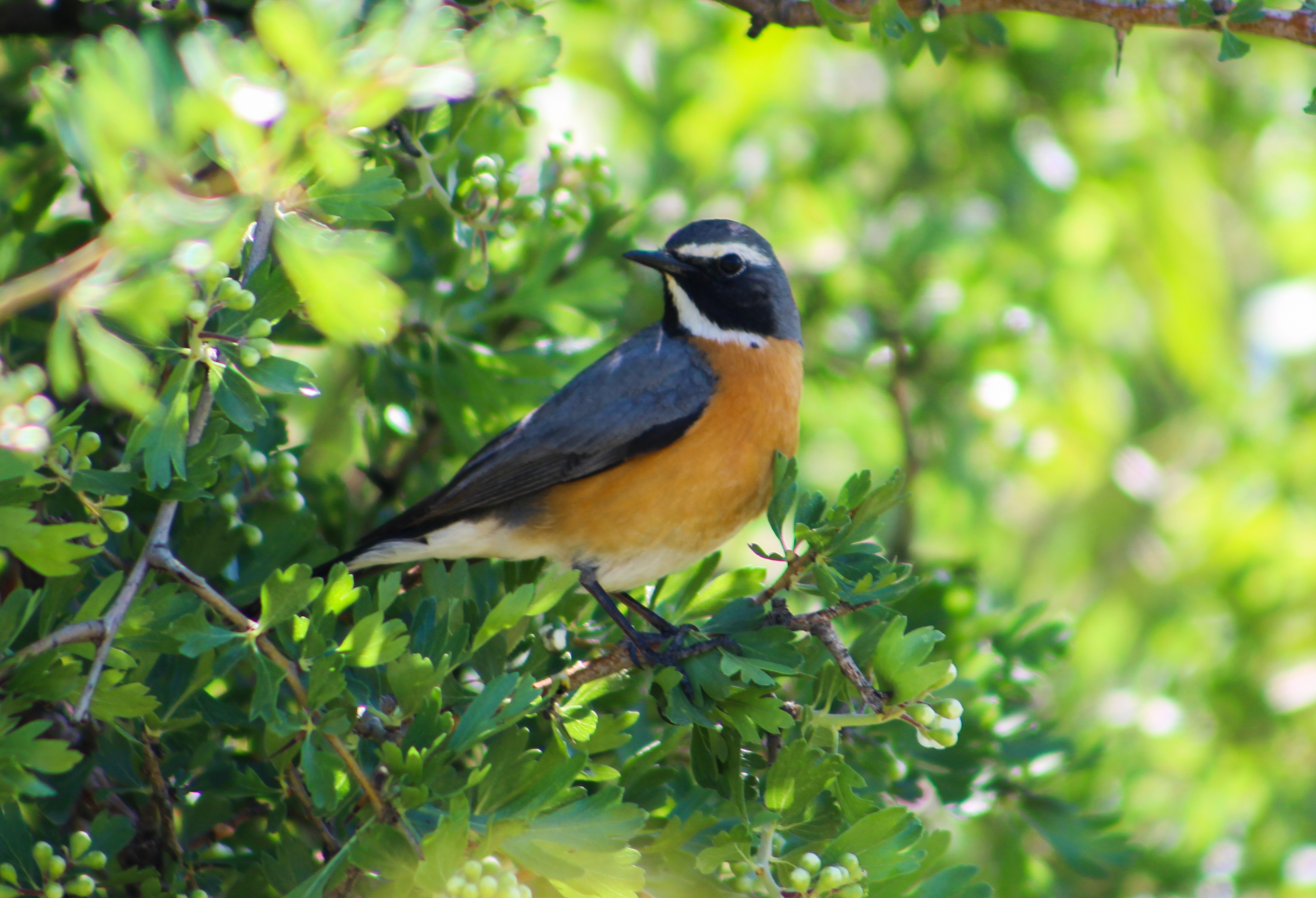
Male in Selman, Eğil, Turkey

This species is larger than the European robin, having a length of 16 centimetres (6.3 in) and a wingspan of 28 centimetres (11 in). The breeding male has lead-grey upperparts, a black face with a white throat and supercilium, and orange underparts. The tail is black, as is the strong bill. Females are plainer, mainly grey apart from a black tail, hints of orange on the flanks, and some white throat streaks.

The male's song is a fast twittering, given from a bush or in flight. The call of this species is a chis-it double note, like that of the white wagtail.

== Behavior ==
The white-throated robin is mostly insectivorous. It has been observed foraging for small invertebrates on the ground or in low vegetation, particularly during the breeding season when protein is important for the chicks' development. During autumn, fruits are also taken.

It is a seasonal breeder, breeding from May to June. It nests low to the ground in a bush or tree cavity or on a stump or log, laying a clutch of 4–6 eggs. Nests are flat and cup-shaped and made out of cereal stalks, twigs, hair, and feathers.

== Distribution and habitat ==
The white-throated robin is a migratory species, breeding from Turkey to Afghanistan in western Asia, and wintering in East Africa. In East Africa they are found in closed thickets in dry country, typically Acacia-Commiphora woodland on the dry central plateau. Small numbers reach the Usangu Plains of Ruaha National Park in Tanzania, which is normally their southern limit. In dry years however, some may move still further south, and reach moister uplands at 1,600 metres (5,250 ft). The species is also a very rare vagrant to Europe, with observations as far northwest as Norway, the United Kingdom, and Sweden.

The white-throated robin's main breeding habitat is dry rocky slopes dominated by scrub, often at high altitudes, usually 1,000 to 2,200 metres (3,300 to 7,200 ft) above sea level. Other breeding habitats include semi-desert and mountain steppes, but also less arid habitats such as ravines with mountain streams.

== Media gallery ==
Video of foraging male in Saudi Arabia, 1993

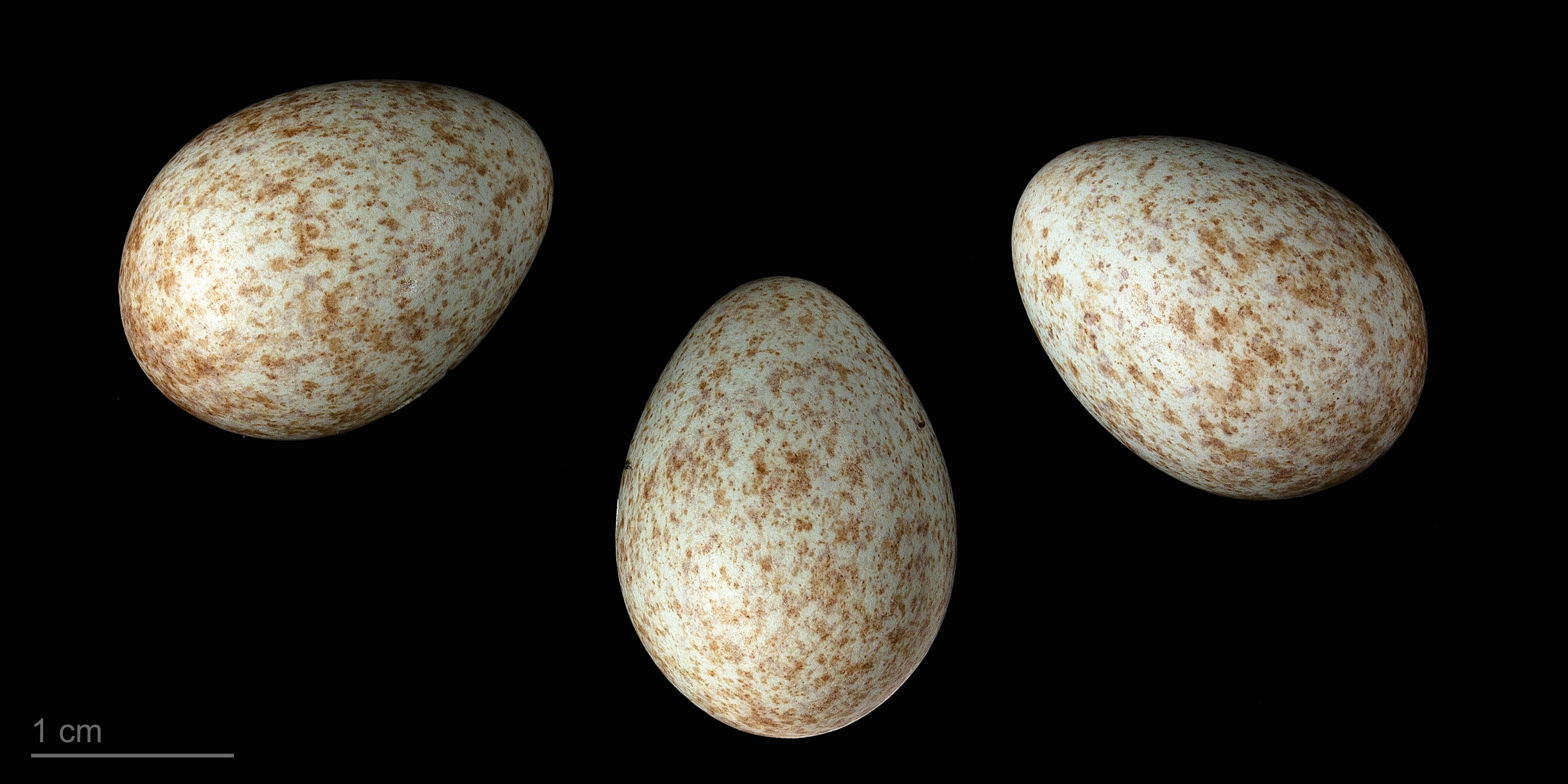
Eggs of Irania gutturalis - MHNT

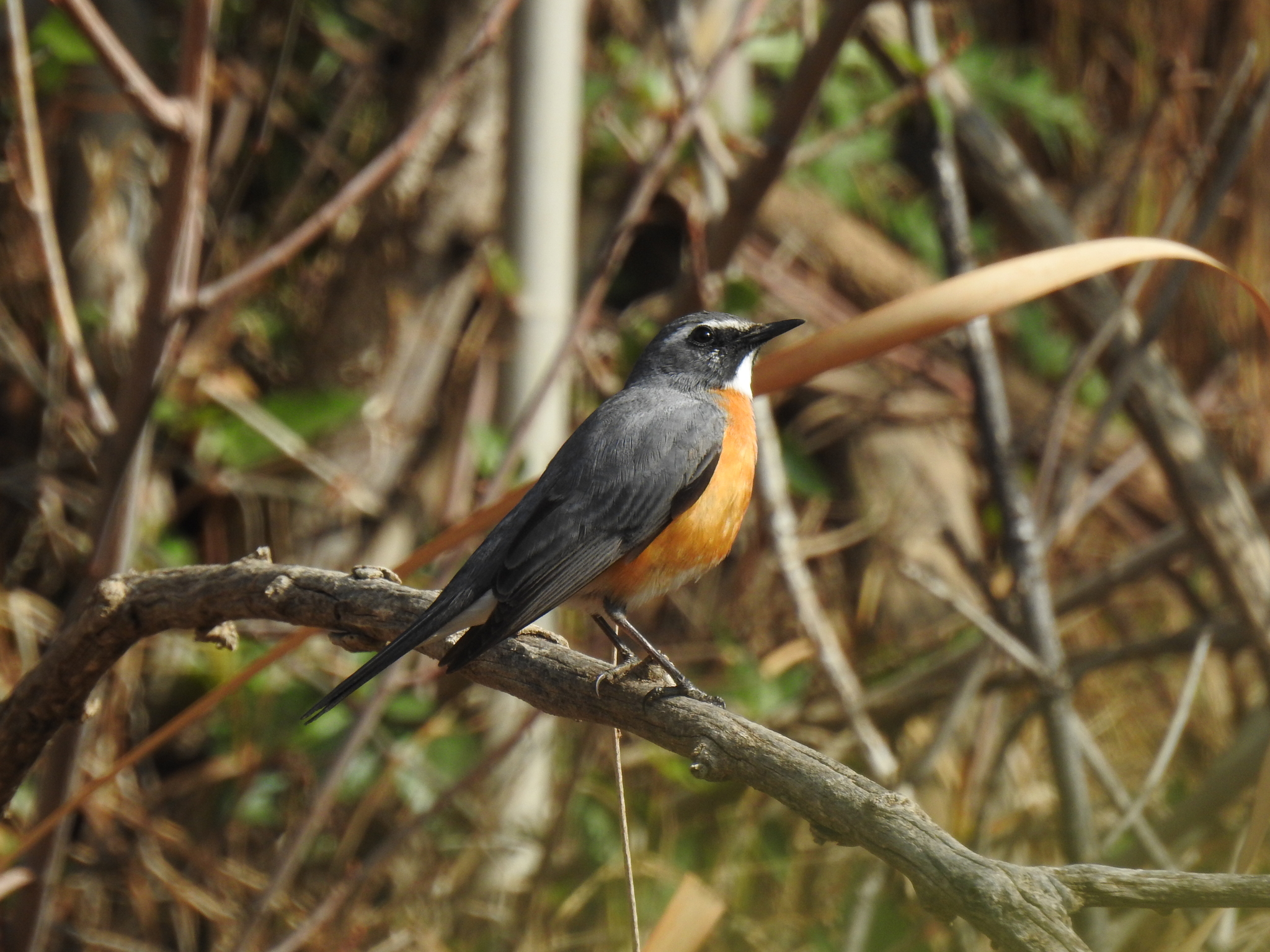
Male during migration, near Abha, Saudi Arabia
