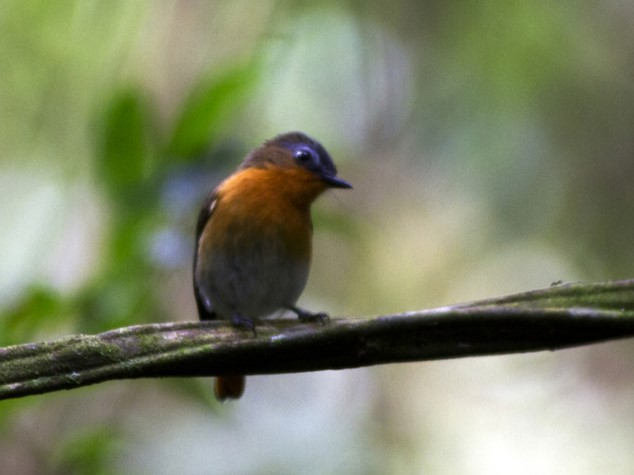

Scientific classification
- Kingdom: Animalia
- Phylum: Chordata
- Class: Aves
- Order: Passeriformes
- Family: Muscicapidae
- Genus: Cossyphicula; Grote, 1934

Type species
- Callene roberti Alexander, 1903

= Cossyphicula =

Genus of birds

Cossyphicula is a genus of passerine birds belonging to the Old World flycatcher family Muscicapidae that are found in Sub-Saharan Africa.

== Taxonomy ==
The genus Cossyphicula was introduced in 1934 by the German ornithologist Hermann Grote to accommodate the white-bellied robin-chat which is therefore considered as the type species. The name is a diminutive of the genus name Cossypha introduced for the robin-chats by Nicholas Aylward Vigors in 1825.

== Species ==
The genus contains two species:

- White-bellied robin-chat, Cossyphicula roberti
- Mountain robin-chat, Cossyphicula isabellae (formerly placed in Cossypha)
