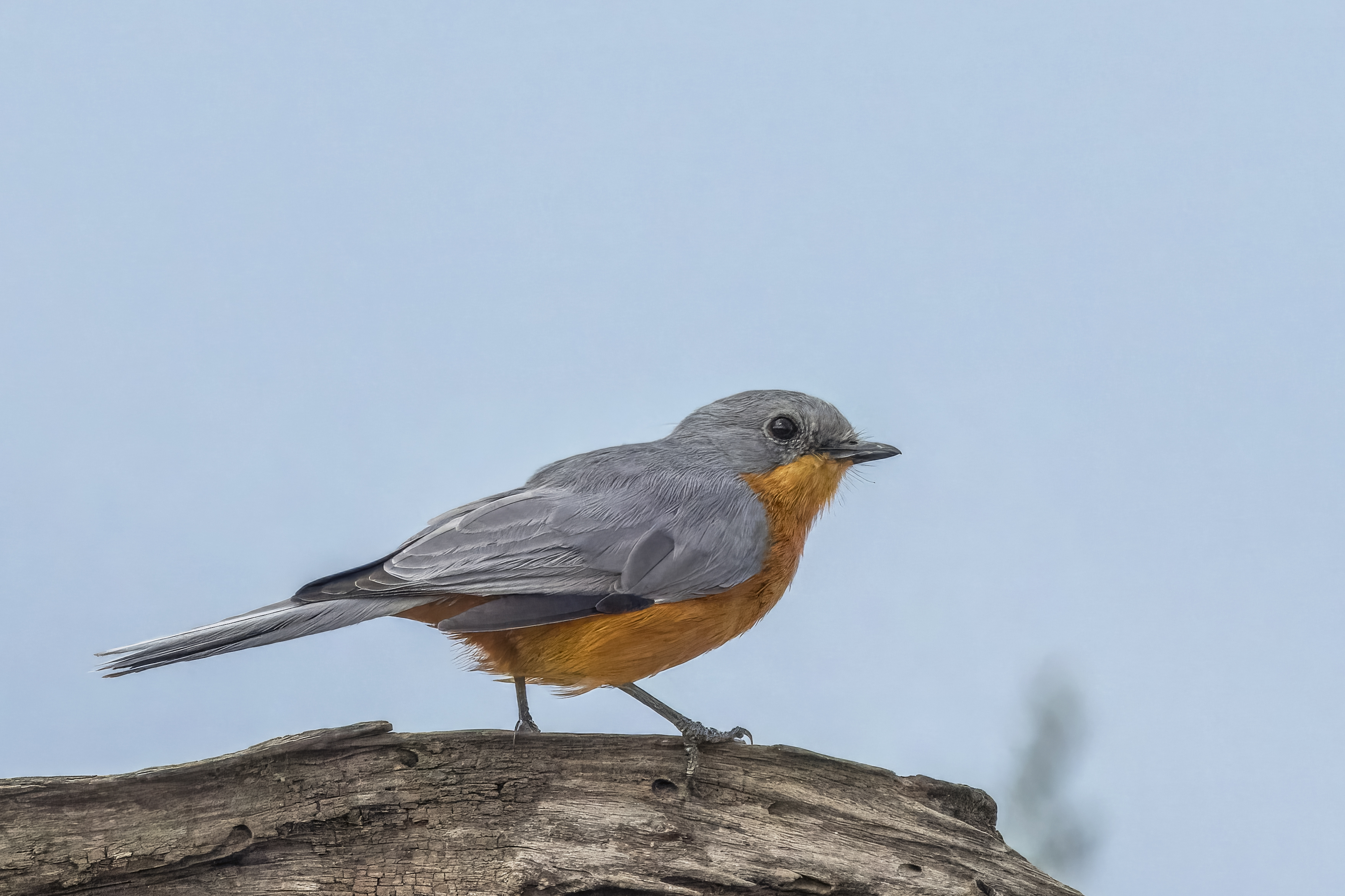
- Serengeti National Park, Tanzania

Conservation status
- Least Concern (IUCN 3.1)

Scientific classification
- Kingdom: Animalia
- Phylum: Chordata
- Class: Aves
- Order: Passeriformes
- Family: Muscicapidae
- Genus: Empidornis; Reichenow, 1901
- Species: E. semipartitus

Binomial name
- Empidornis semipartitus (Rüppell, 1840)

Synonyms
- Melaenornis semipartitus

= Silverbird (bird) =

Species of bird

The silverbird (Empidornis semipartitus) is an Old World flycatcher native to Eastern Africa, from Sudan to Tanzania. The species is the only member of the genus Empidornis, although it is sometimes placed in the genus Melaenornis .

== Description ==
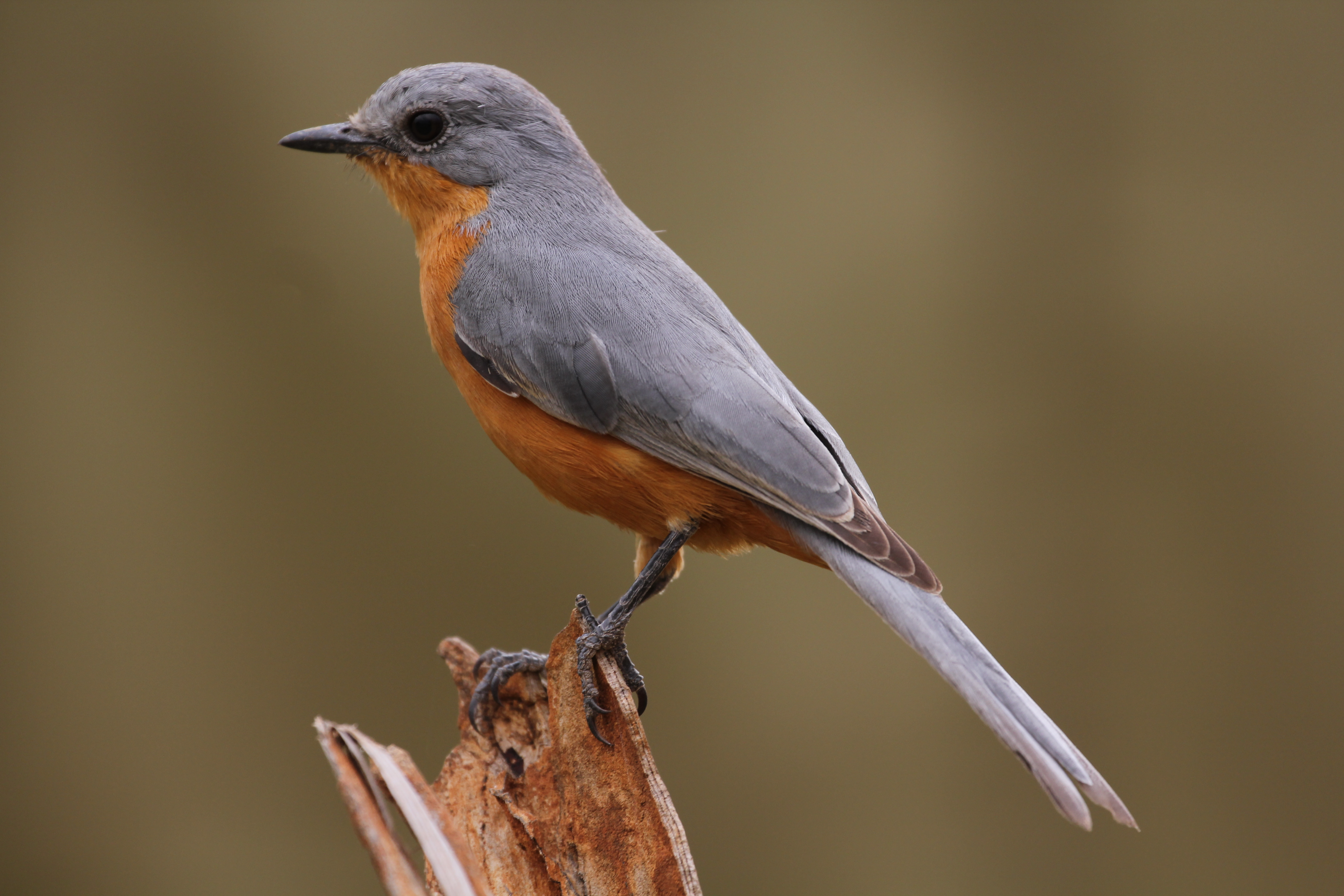
Male silverbird in Murchison Falls National Park, Uganda

The silverbird is a stunning flycatcher of open areas west of the Rift Valley, silvery grey above and tawny orange below. Juveniles have black-bordered tawny spots on upperparts, mottled buff and black on throats and breasts. The species is 18 cm (7.1 in) long and weighs 22–23 g (0.78–0.81 oz).

The call of the silverbird uses short phrases which are slightly thrush-like. Sometimes the terminal note is higher and thinner, eee-sleeur-eeee or sweet siursur-eet-seet; also a longer eep-eep churEErip, eep-eep cherip chch chchch eee, embellished with chattering and seep notes.
