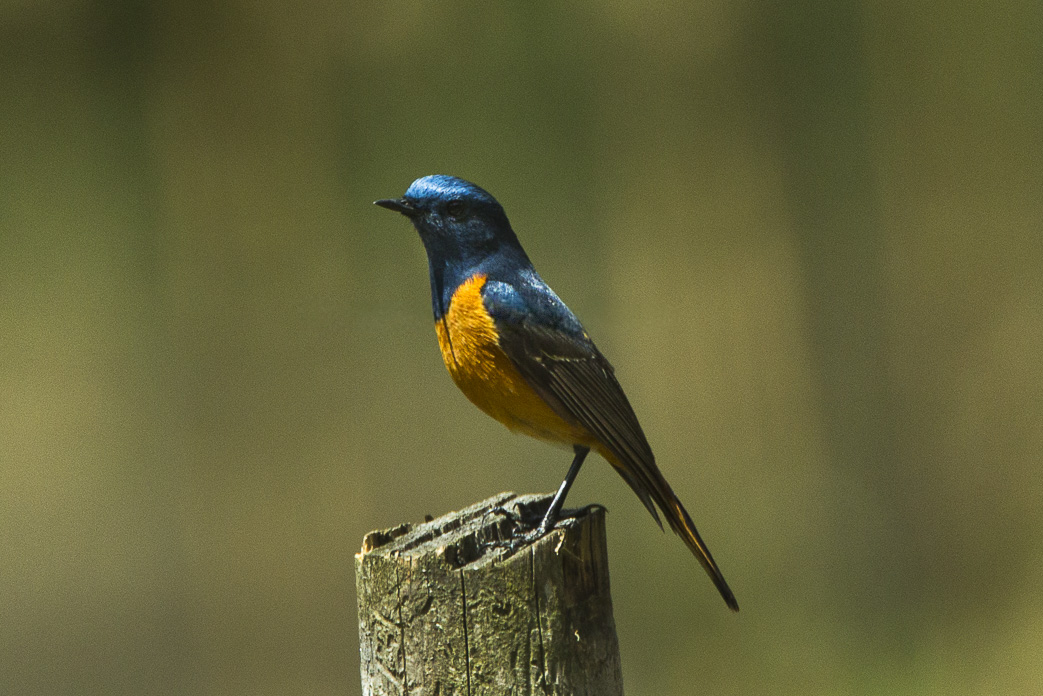

Conservation status
- Least Concern (IUCN 3.1)

Scientific classification
- Kingdom: Animalia
- Phylum: Chordata
- Class: Aves
- Order: Passeriformes
- Family: Muscicapidae
- Genus: Cinclidium; Blyth, 1842
- Species: C. frontale

Binomial name
- Cinclidium frontale Blyth, 1842

= Blue-fronted robin =

Species of bird

The blue-fronted robin (Cinclidium frontale) is a species of bird in the family Muscicapidae. It is the only species in the monotypic genus Cinclidium. It is found in Bhutan, China, Northeast India, Laos, Thailand, Vietnam, and possibly Nepal. Its natural habitat is temperate forests. As of June 12th,2024 this species is categorized as of least concern on the IUCN red list, with a stable population trend, though Birds of the World notes that it is uncommon in parts of its range. Blue-fronted robins are a bird species with limited published research.

== Description ==
The blue-fronted robin produces short whistle-like vocalizations composed of several brief notes, which may be given in quick succession with variations in pitch and intensity, typically consisting of three to four notes. Blue-fronted robins are 18-20 centimeters long, weighing 25-26 grams, which is about 0.05 pounds. Male blue-fronted robins have a dark blue body and sapphire blue head, brown along the back, yellow-orange underparts, and a small black bill with grey legs. Female blue-fronted robins have an olive-brown head and body with pale underparts. Although similar to the white-tailed robin in appearance, both sexes of the blue-fronted robin lack white markings on the tail.

== Taxonomy ==
Cinclidium frontale has two subspecies, being variants of the blue-fronted robin, which are Cinclidium frontale frontale, known as the sunda robin, and Cinclidium frontale orientale.They belong to the same family, Muscicapidae, but have different characteristics and distributions.

== Distribution ==
The blue-fronted robin is found in Bhutan, China, Northeast India, Laos, Thailand, Vietnam, and Nepal. Elevation can be from 800-3000 meters.Such as in the Himalayas, they are between 1800- 2200 meters, whereas in Northeast India, it is 800 meters.

== Habitat ==
Blue-fronted robins inhabit forests or shrublands such as bamboo or evergreen forest that have dense forest vegetation. The species forages in low vegetation, including bamboo, and feeds on small ground insects. The species occurs primarily in mid- to high-elevation forests, where they typically feed on lower levels or on the ground.Cinclidium frontale are not migratory, and may move to lower elevations during the winter.

== Breeding ==
Breeding populations of the blue-fronted robin have been recorded in Thailand and Vietnam. Information about the timing of the blue-fronted robin’s breeding season remains limited in available research.

== Conservation ==
The blue-fronted robin is categorized as Least Concern on the IUCN Red List due to its stable population trend. The species has been documented in wildlife trade records, appearing in one of seven evaluated trade datasets, indicating that the species occurs in trade at relatively low levels.
