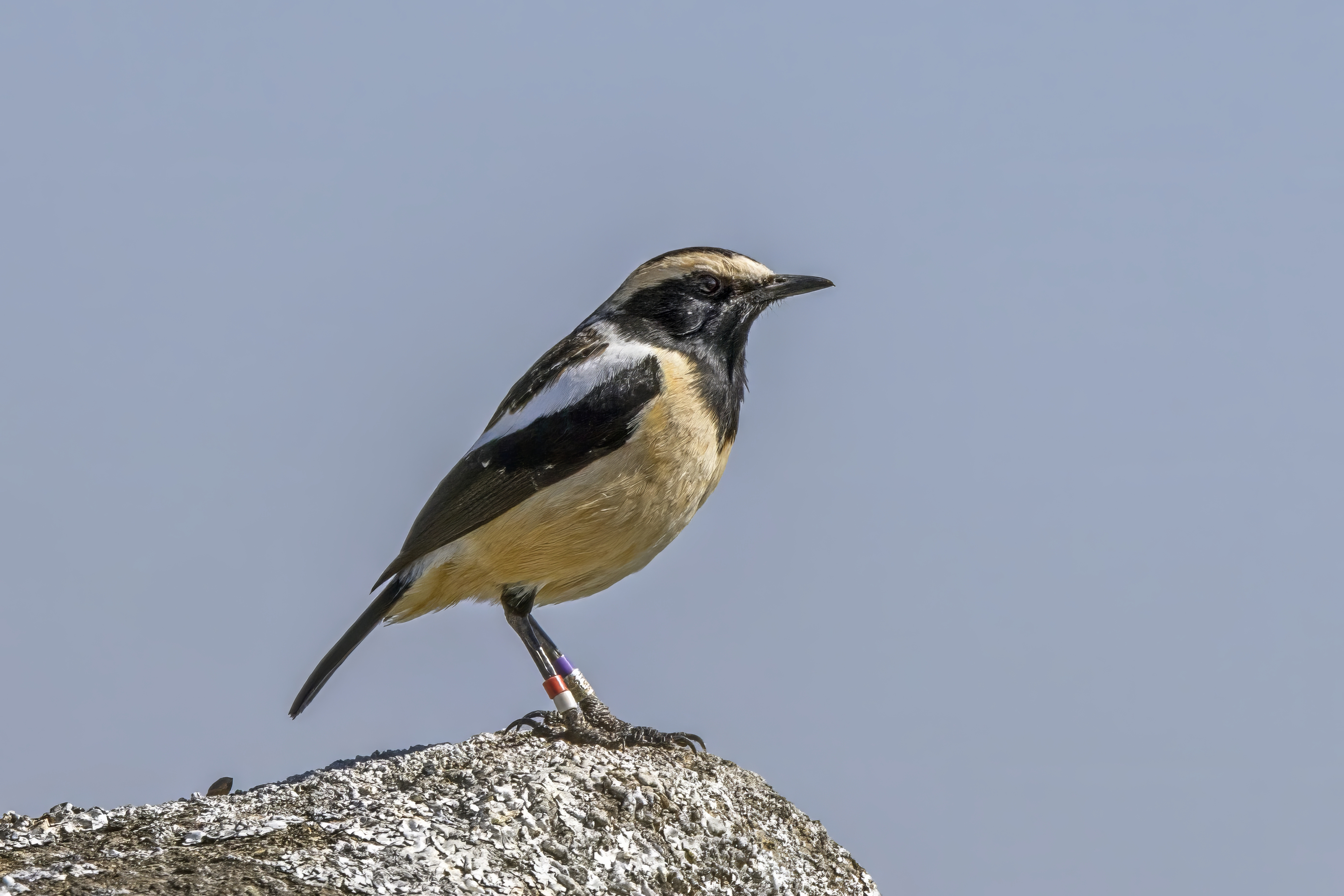
- male in Eswatini Song recorded near God's Window, Blyde River Canyon Nature Reserve, South Africa

Conservation status
- Least Concern (IUCN 3.1)

Scientific classification
- Kingdom: Animalia
- Phylum: Chordata
- Class: Aves
- Order: Passeriformes
- Family: Muscicapidae
- Genus: Campicoloides; Roberts, 1922
- Species: C. bifasciatus

Binomial name
- Campicoloides bifasciatus (Temminck, 1829)

Synonyms
- Saxicola bifasciata (Temminck, 1829); Saxicola bifasciatus (Clements 6.3.2, 2008); Oenanthe bifasciata

= Buff-streaked chat =

Species of bird

The buff-streaked chat or buff-streaked bushchat (Campicoloides bifasciatus) is a species of bird in the family Muscicapidae. It is found in Lesotho, South Africa, and Eswatini. Its natural habitat is subtropical or tropical dry lowland grassland.
