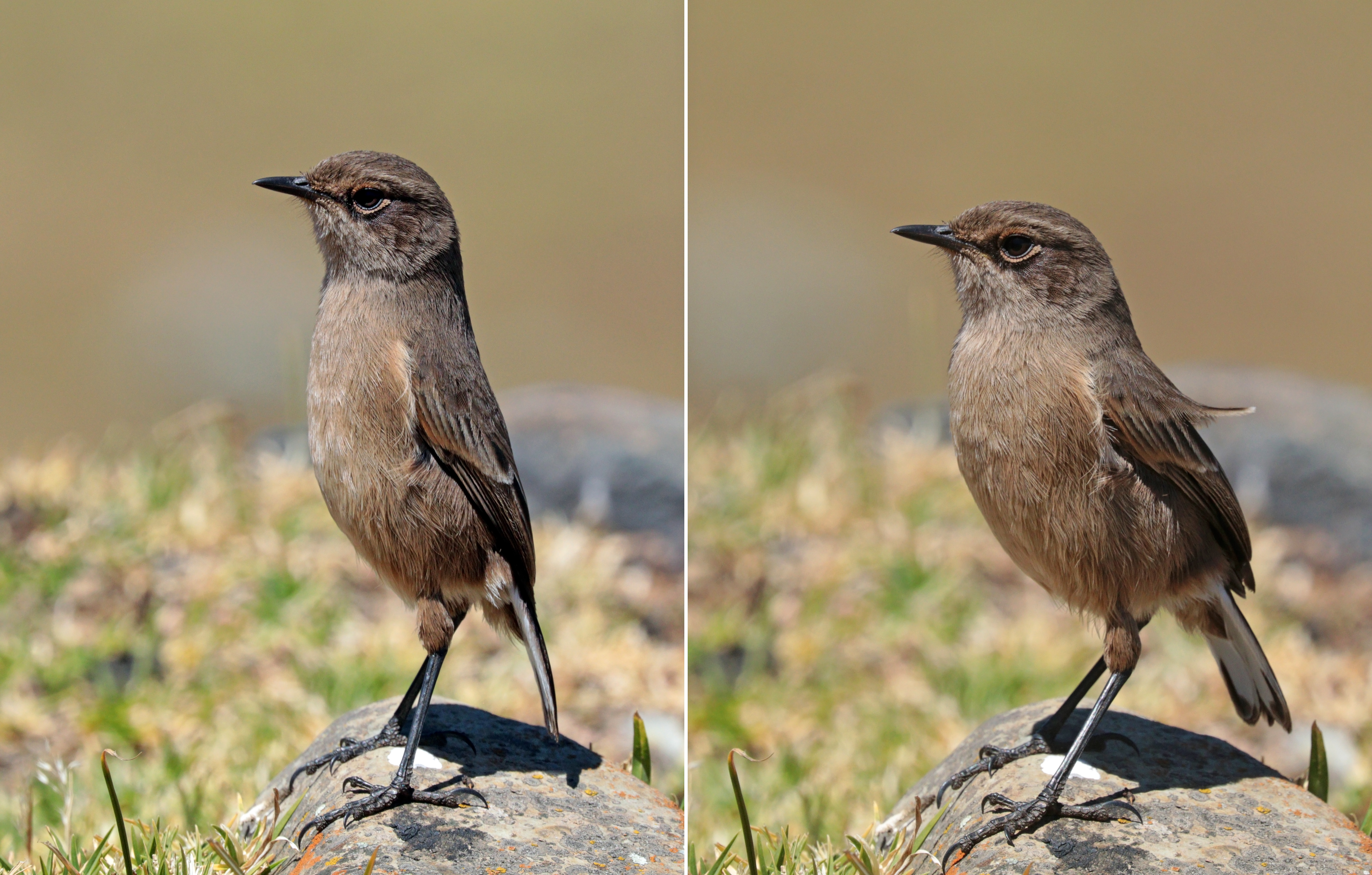
- C. s. sordida, Ethiopia
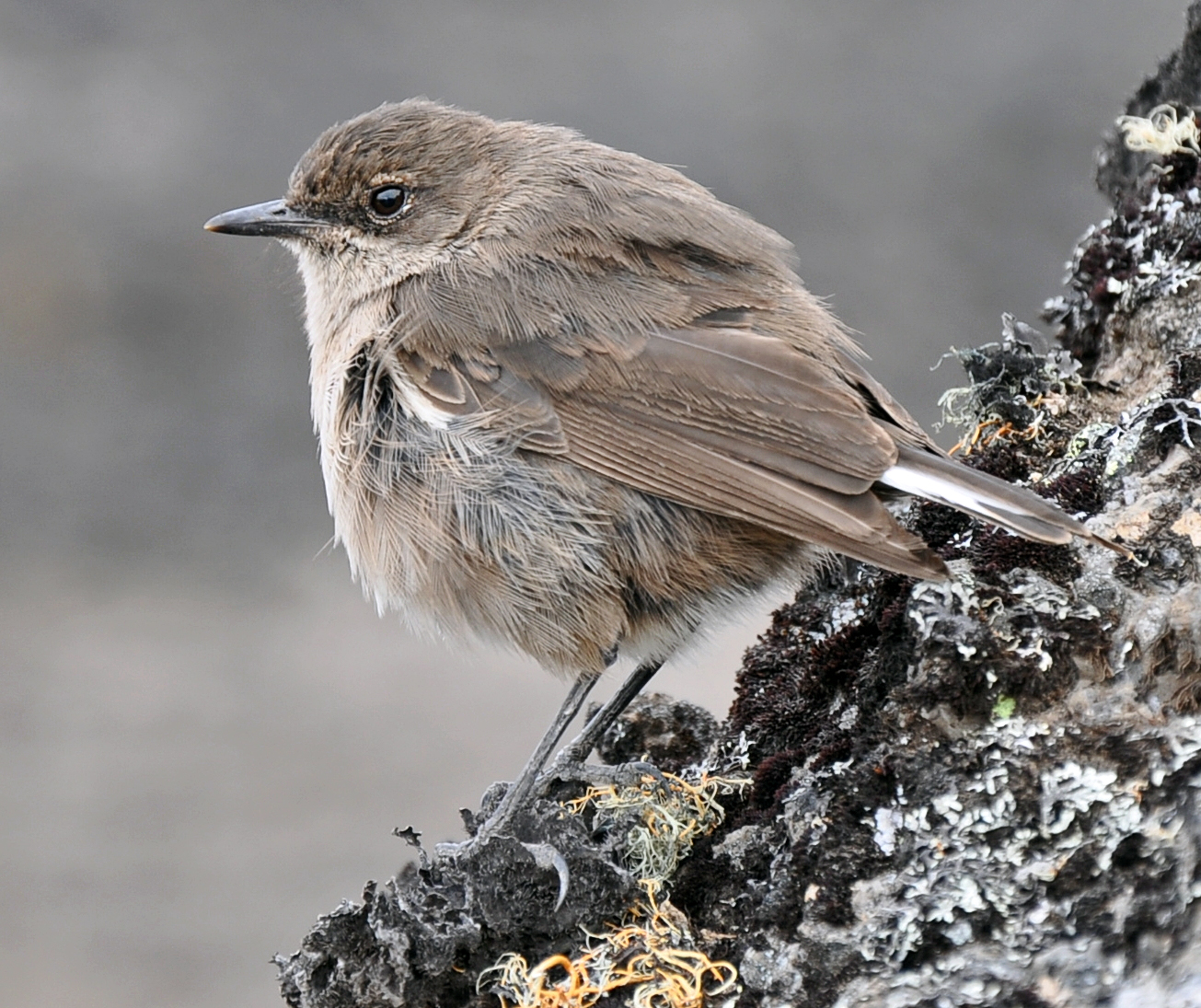
- P. s. ernesti, Kenya

Conservation status
- Least Concern (IUCN 3.1)

Scientific classification
- Kingdom: Animalia
- Phylum: Chordata
- Class: Aves
- Order: Passeriformes
- Family: Muscicapidae
- Genus: Pinarochroa; Sundevall, 1872
- Species: P. sordida

Binomial name
- Pinarochroa sordida (Rüppell, 1837)

Synonyms
- Cercomela sordida

= Moorland chat =

Species of bird

The moorland chat (Pinarochroa sordida), also known as the alpine chat or hill chat, is a species of songbird in the Old World flycatcher family. It is endemic to the eastern Afromontane. It lives at high altitudes on moors and grassland, usually above 3,400 m (11,100 ft), but can live as low as 2,100 m (6,900 ft). It has a short tail and long legs. It is bold and will approach people.

== Taxonomy ==
The moorland chat was formally described in 1837 by the German naturalist Eduard Rüppell from a specimen collected in the Simien Mountains of northern Ethiopia. Rüppell coined the binomial name Saxicola sordica.

The chat was discovered on Mount Elgon on the Uganda-Kenya border by Frederick Jackson. The English geographer Halford Mackinder brought back the same bird from Mount Kenya in 1899. He presented a paper on the first ascent to the Royal Geographical Society in 1900. The scientific results of his expedition were discussed in detail afterwards.

A very curious little bird was found by Mr Jackson on Mount Elgon at a height of 11,000 feet, and I remember saying to Mr. Mackinder that he was bound to find the same sort of little chat on Mount Kenya, at a height of 11,000 feet. This he did, and it was the same species as the Mount Elgon bird, an ordinary-looking little brown chat, with a good deal of white in the tail.

— Dr Bowdler Sharpe, A Journey to the Summit of Mount Kenya, British East Africa: Discussion

The moorland chat was usually placed in the genus Cercomela, but molecular phylogenetic studies published in 2010 and 2012 found that the species was not closely related to birds in Cercomela or to birds in the closely related genus Oenanthe. The moorland chat was therefore assigned to its own monotypic genus Pinarochroa which had been introduced by the Swedish zoologist Carl Jakob Sundevall in 1872. The genus name Pinarochroa is derived from the Greek word pinaros meaning "dirty" and khroos, khroas meaning "coloured". The specific epithet sordida is from the Latin sordidus meaning "shabby" or "dirty".

Four subspecies are recognised:

- P. s. sordida (Rüppell, 1837) – Ethiopia
- P. s. ernesti Sharpe, 1900 – Uganda and Kenya
- P. s. olimotiensis Elliott, HFI, 1945 – Crater Highlands (north Tanzania)
- P. s. hypospodia Shelley, 1885 – Mount Kilimanjaro (north Tanzania)
