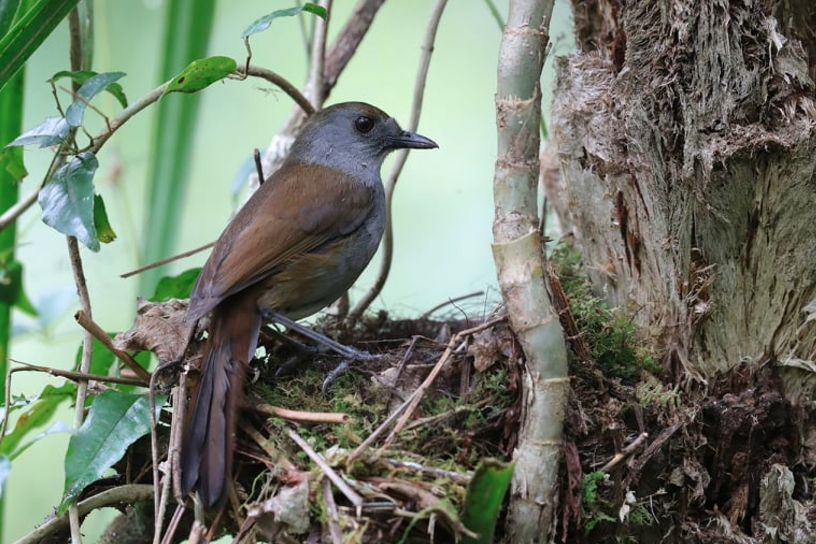

Conservation status
- Least Concern (IUCN 3.1)

Scientific classification
- Kingdom: Animalia
- Phylum: Chordata
- Class: Aves
- Order: Passeriformes
- Family: Muscicapidae
- Genus: Leonardina; Mearns, 1905
- Species: L. woodi

Binomial name
- Leonardina woodi (Mearns, 1905)

Synonyms
- Trichastoma woodi (Mearns, 1905)

= Bagobo babbler =

Species of bird

The Bagobo babbler or Bagobo robin (Leonardina woodi) is a monotypic species of bird with its taxonomy undergoing numerous changes and is currently classified as Muscicapidae or an old world flycatcher. It is endemic to the Philippines, only found on Mindanao. It was once deemed "unquestionably the Philippines most secretive bird" by ornithologist Robert Kennedy. Its habitat is in moist montane forests up to 2,030 meters above sea level. It is named after the Bagobo tribe.

== Description and taxonomy ==
EBird describes the bird as "A seldom-seen medium-sized ground bird. Rufous-brown above from the crown to the tail, gray below with a white throat and rufous from the lower belly to the base of the tail. Note the sturdy black bill, long legs, and large feet. Somewhat similar to long-tailed bush warbler but lacks the pale brow and does not cock its tail. Voice consists of very high-pitched whistles and some harsh rasping notes." This species does not exhibit sexual dimorphism.

The taxonomy of this bird is still unclear as it has been moved from different families over the past century, it was initially placed in the Old World babbler family Timaliidae by McGregor, later placed in Pellorneidae, but molecular studies have now shown it belongs to the family Muscicapidae, which makes it the only endemic robin in the country.

Even its genus placement has proven as elusive and secretive as the bird itself, initially described as its own genus, Leonardina. It was moved around multiple times from Malaconcila in 1946 and back to Leonardina 1964 and then to Trichastoma in 1985 and back to its original genus for the third time in 1990 where it has remained since.

This species is currently monotypic but due to its extremely secretive nature and lack of specimens, studies on regional variation and possible subspecies has yet to be conducted or released.

== Ecology and behavior ==
Starting 2018, a major study was conducted by the Robert S. Kennedy Bird Conservancy, which recorded 62 nests over a 4 year period in an area called the Living Laboratory on the foothills of Mt. Kitanglad. These results were released in 2022 in a monograph called "Demistifying the Bagobo Robin". Prior to this study, there was only 1 wild photo of this bird in 2015.

Surprisingly, a vast majority of these nests were found in degraded secondary forest. This species showed a great affinity towards nesting in tree ferns, small ferns and forest pandans. The average clutch size was 2 eggs which are light brown and have slight mottling. These eggs are laid in 1 day intervals and incubate for 14 to 16 days.

In this study, close to 200 instances of feeding in 15 nests showed that around 28% of prey items were earthworms and the vast majority consisted of other prey items were other insects. There were a few instances in which the adult birds fed the introduced Calamaria gervaisii, skinks and a frog. This diet is for nesting season but it is likely that the diet for this adult birds is similar. It uses its strong legs and rapid wing beats to catch resting insects. It forages mostly in the ground on leaf litter, rotting logs and shrub branches. Birds have been seen drinking from shallow pools near streams.

Nestlings have been recorded to be preyed upon by the Besra. Ant bites have also been known to cause chick mortality.

== Habitat and conservation status ==
It is found primarily in moist mid-montane and montane forests ranging from 500 - 2,000 m. Prior to the study, it was believed that this bird inhabitant only primary forest but it was revealed that this is most common in degraded secondary forest. Surveys done in primary forest revealed a lower density of these birds. Mossy habitats with tree ferns, small ferns and pandan trees are its favored habitat.

IUCN has assessed this bird as a Least-concern species but there is a great lack of knowledge on any population statistics. The population was previously presumed to be threatened being declared Vulnerable up until 1996. However, recent fieldwork and research by the Robert S. Kennedy Bird Conservancy and BirdLife International has revealed this species to be more abundant than previously thought, in which nesting birds were found as close as 50 meters apart. It is not as threatened as other Philippine endemics as its montane habitat is less prone to deforestation as compared to lowland forests due to accessibility issues. Despite this, deforestation still occurs in these areas its just not to the extent of lowland forest. This species is occasionally by-catch of hunting snares intended to catch rails, junglefowl and doves. Due to this, it has been suggested that this bird be reclassified as data deficient.

Robert S. Kennedy Bird Conservancy Living Laboratory actively protects 500 hectares of this habitat that contains the highest density of Bagobo robin and also serves as a home for Mindanao endemic birds such as the Slaty-backed jungle flycatcher, Red-eared parrotfinch and Bukidnon woodcock. This species occurs in other protected areas such as Mount Apo and Mount Kitanglad.
