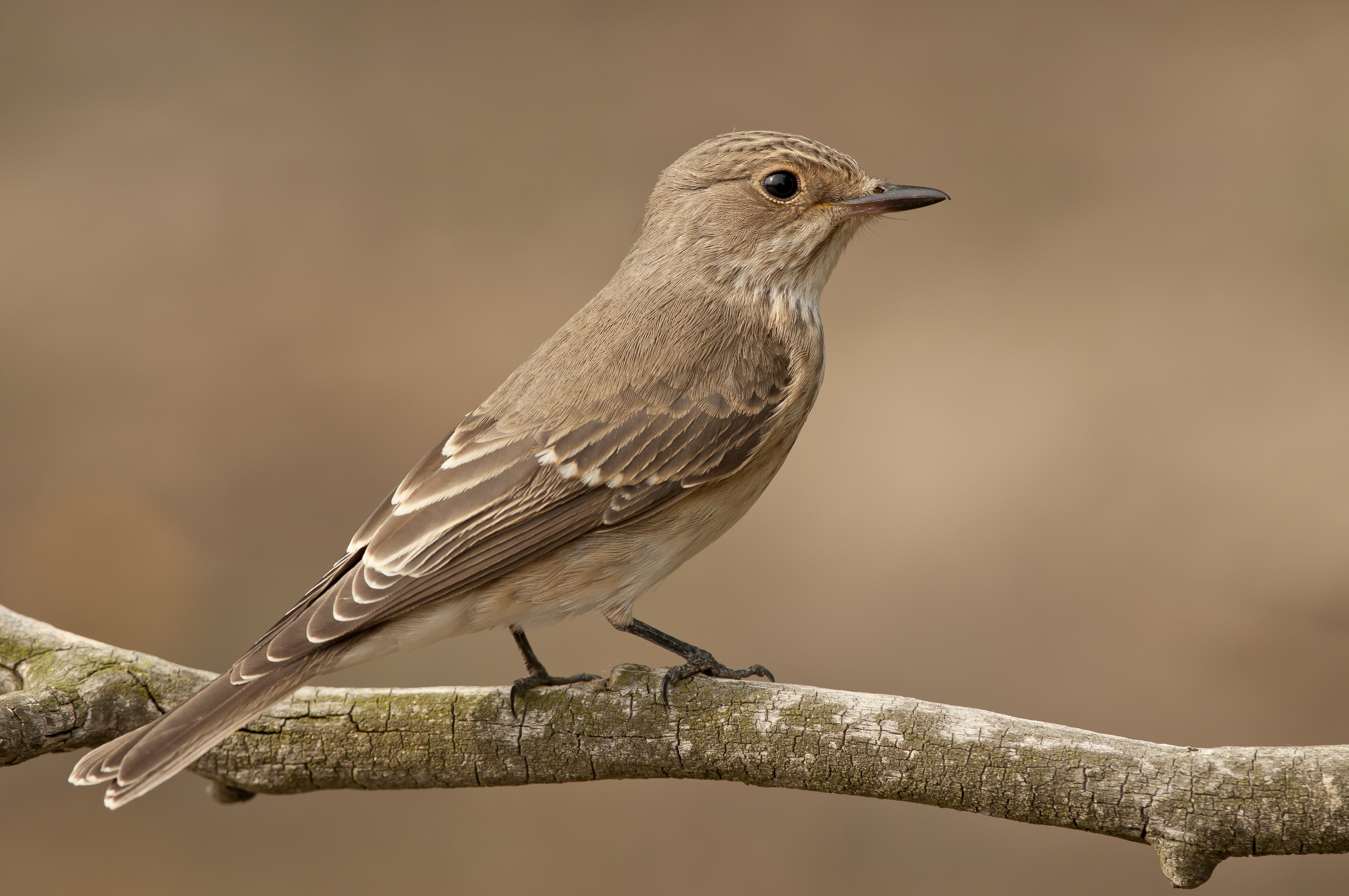
- Spotted flycatcher (Muscicapa striata)

Scientific classification
- Kingdom: Animalia
- Phylum: Chordata
- Class: Aves
- Order: Passeriformes
- Superfamily: Muscicapoidea
- Family: Muscicapidae; Fleming J., 1822

Type genus
- Muscicapa

Genera
- See text

= Old World flycatcher =

Old World flycatchers

Family of birds

The Old World flycatchers are a large family, the Muscicapidae, of small passerine birds restricted to the Old World (Europe, Africa and Asia), with the exception of several vagrants and two species, bluethroat (Luscinia svecica) and northern wheatear (Oenanthe oenanthe), found also in North America. These are mainly small arboreal insectivores, many of which, as the name implies, take their prey on the wing. The large family includes 357 species and is divided into 57 genera.

== Taxonomy ==
The name Muscicapa for the family was introduced by the Scottish naturalist John Fleming in 1822. The word had earlier been used for the genus Muscicapa by the French zoologist Mathurin Jacques Brisson in 1760. Muscicapa comes from the Latin musca meaning a fly, and capere to catch.

In 1910, the German ornithologist Ernst Hartert found it impossible to define boundaries between the three families Muscicapidae, Sylviidae (Old World warblers) and Turdidae (thrushes). He therefore treated them as subfamilies of an extended flycatcher family that also included Timaliidae (Old World babblers) and Monarchidae (Monarch flycatchers). Forty years later, a similar arrangement was adopted by the American ornithologists Ernst Mayr and Dean Amadon in an article published in 1951. Their large family, Muscicapidae, which they termed the "primitive insect eaters" contained 1460 species divided into eight subfamilies. The use of the extended group was endorsed by a committee set up following the Eleventh International Ornithological Congress held in Basel in 1954. Subsequent DNA–DNA hybridization studies by Charles Sibley and others showed that the subfamilies were not closely related to one another. As a result, the large group was broken up into a number of separate families, although for a while most authorities continued to retain the thrushes in Muscicapidae. In 1998 the American Ornithologists' Union chose to treat the thrushes as a separate family in the seventh edition of their Check-list of North American birds and subsequently most authors have followed their example.

=== Genera ===
The family formerly included fewer species. At the time of the publication of the third edition of Howard and Moore Complete Checklist of the Birds of the World in 2003, the genera Myophonus, Alethe, Brachypteryx and Heinrichia were included in the thrush family Turdidae. Subsequent molecular phylogenetic studies have shown that the species in these four genera are more closely related to species in Muscicapidae. As a consequence, these four genera are now placed here. In contrast, the genus Cochoa which was previously placed in Muscicapidae has been shown to belong in Turdidae.

Two large molecular phylogenetic studies of species within Muscicapidae published in 2010 showed that the genera Fraseria, Melaenornis and Muscicapa were non-monophyletic. The authors were unable to propose revised genera as not all the species were sampled and not all the nodes in their phylogenies were strongly supported. A subsequent study published in 2016, that included 37 of the 42 Muscicapini species, confirmed that the genera were non-monophyletic and proposed a reorganised arrangement of the species with several new or resurrected genera.

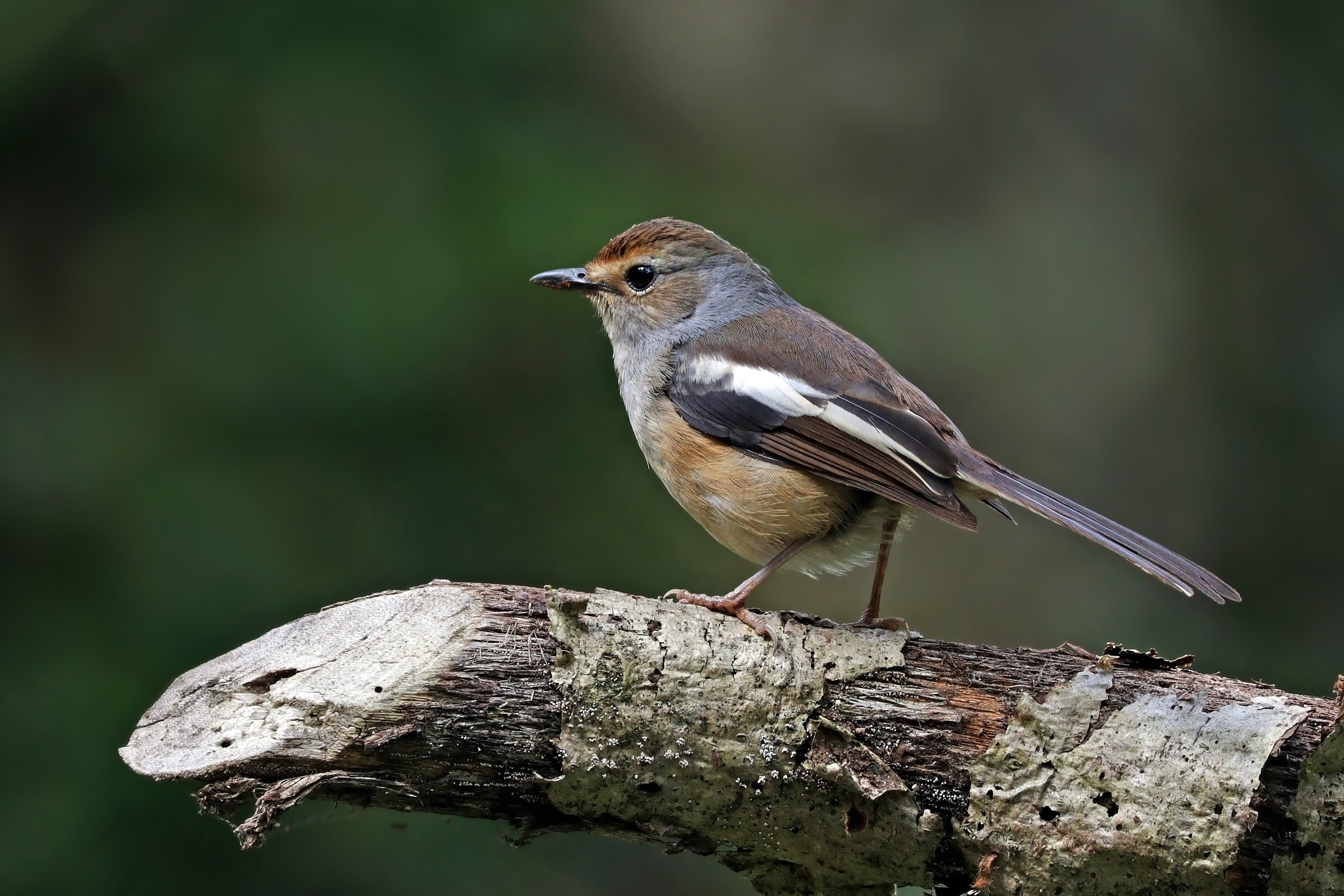
Madagascar magpie-robin Copsychus albospecularis pica

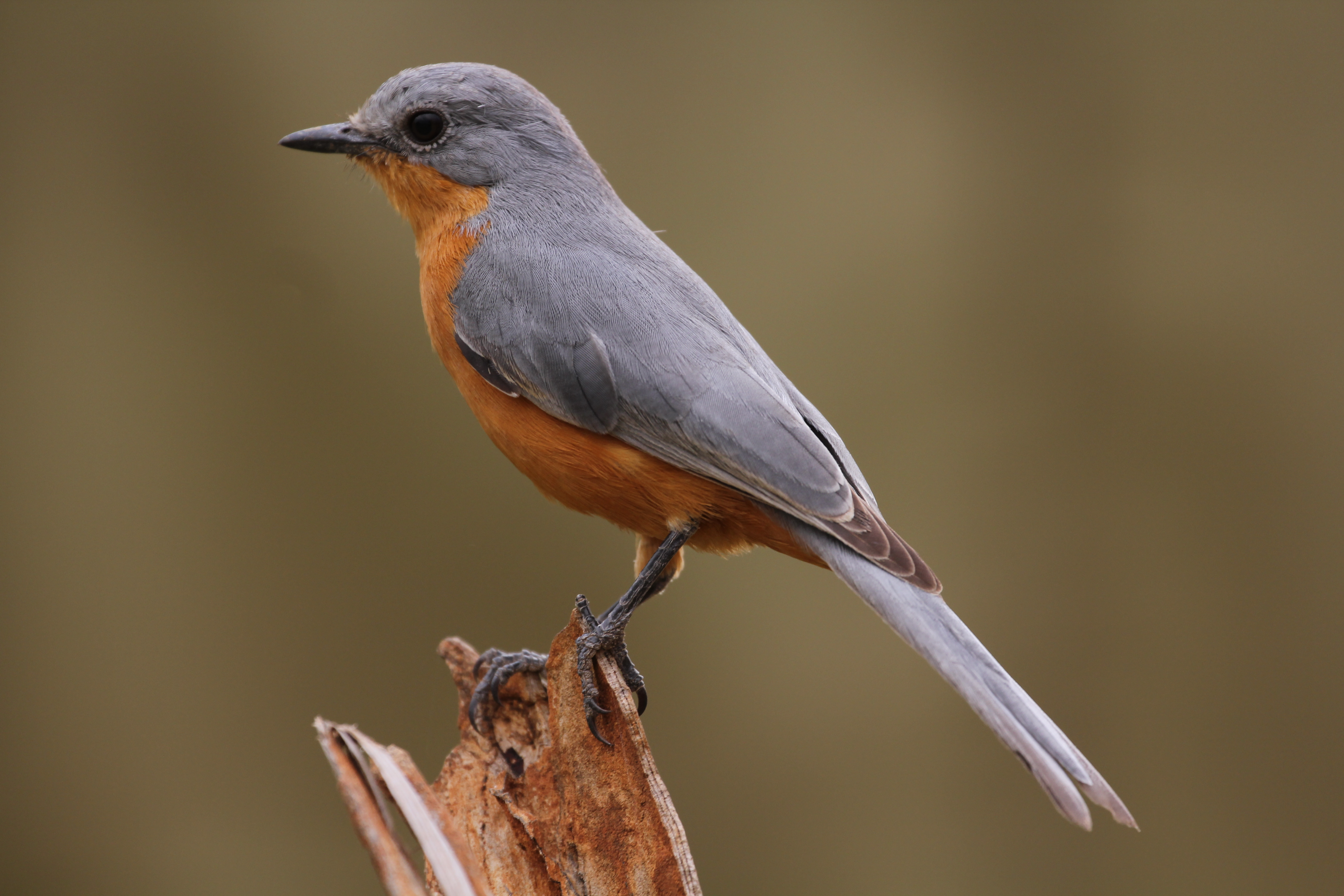
Silverbird, monotypic genus Empidornis

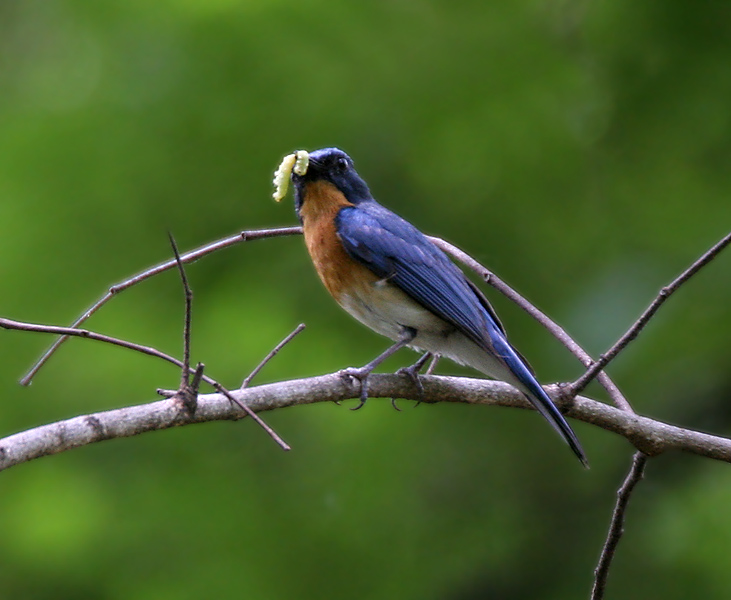
Tickell's blue flycatcher, genus Cyornis

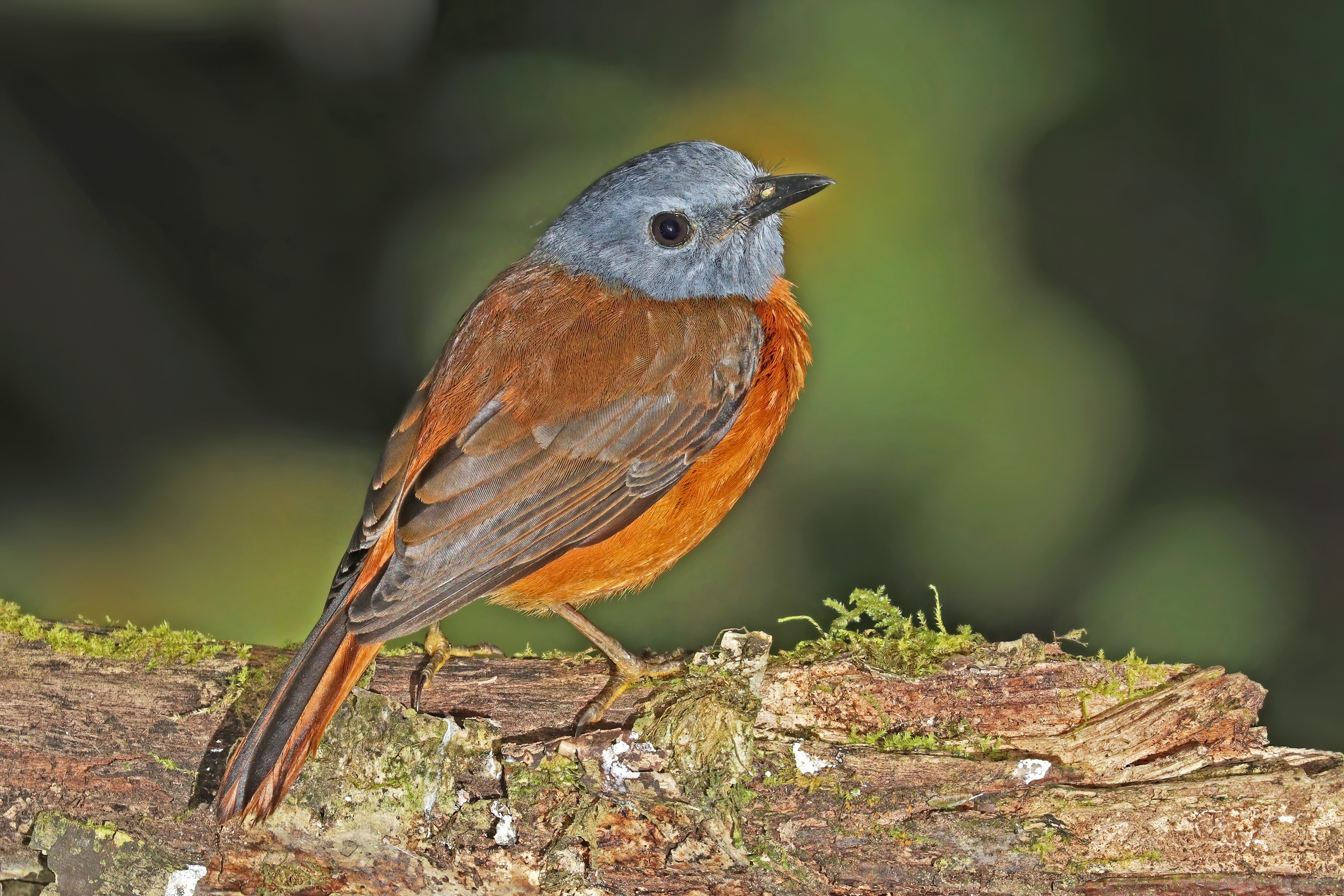
Amber mountain rock thrush Monticola sharpei erythronotus

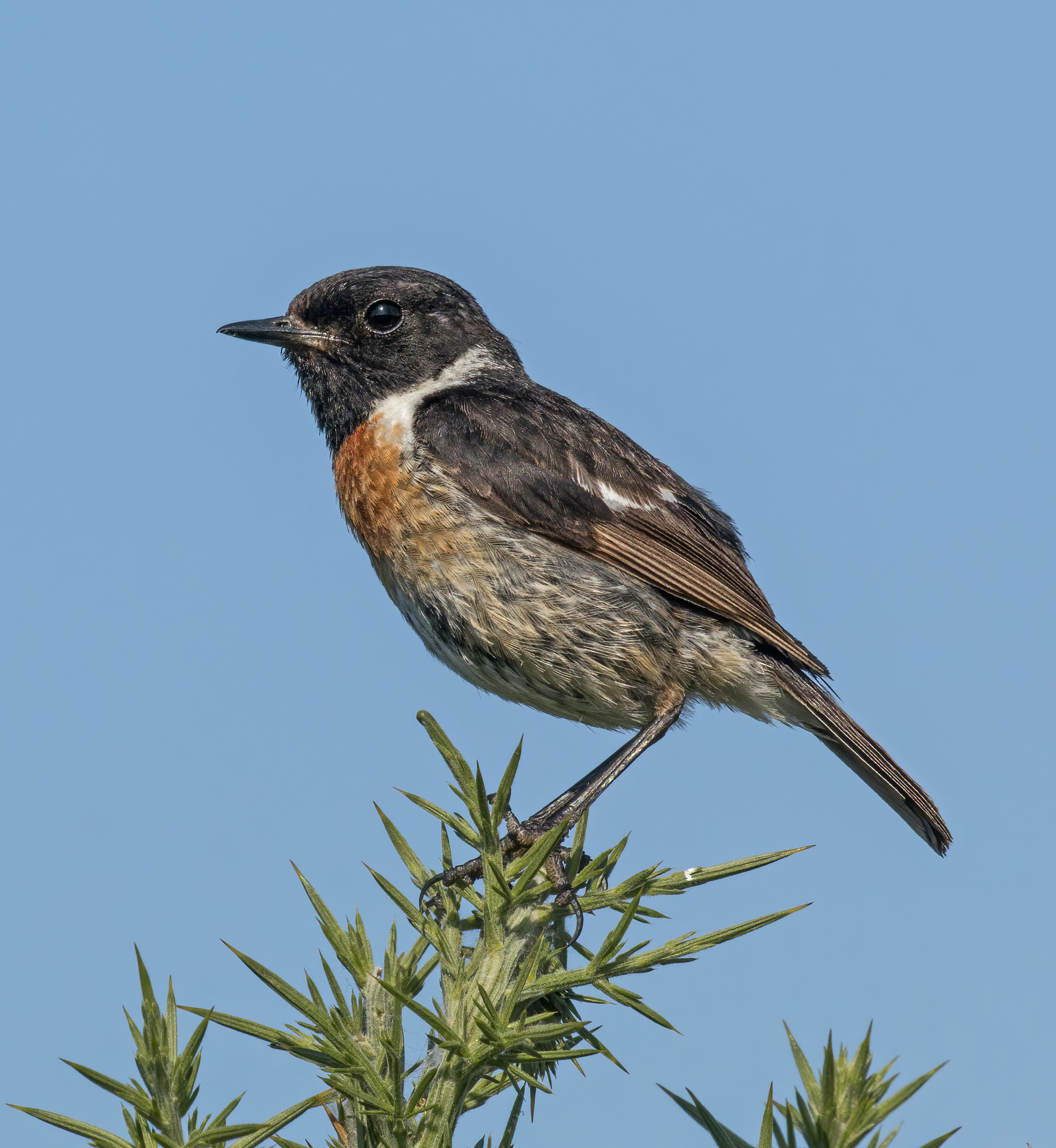
European stonechat Saxicola torquatus

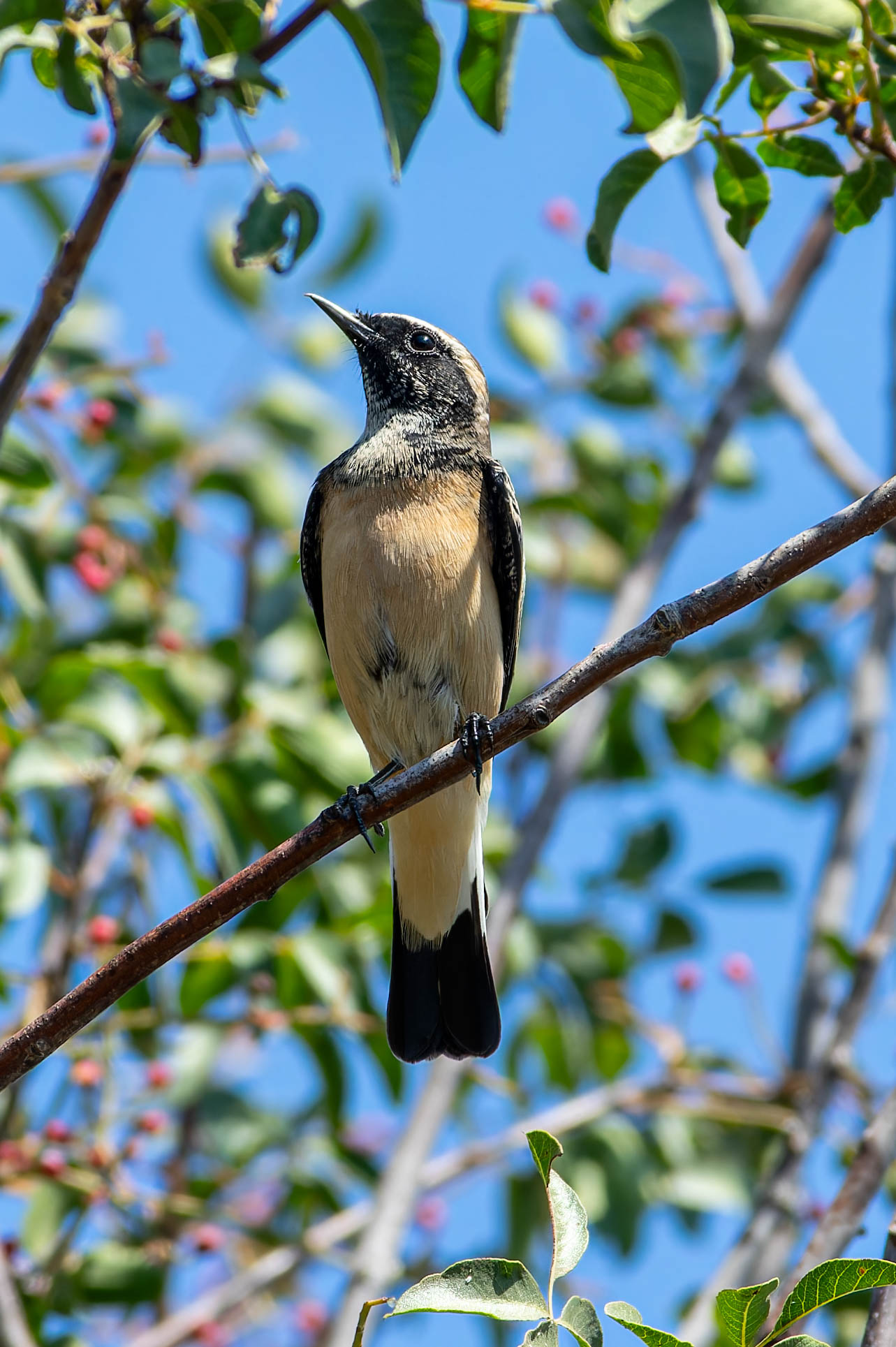
Cyprus wheatear Oenanthe cypriaca

The International Ornithologists' Union recognises 357 species and divides the family into 57 genera. Subdivisions have been proposed by Sangster et al (2010). For a complete list of species, see "List of Old World flycatcher species".

Family Muscicapidae

- Subfamily Muscicapinae (Fleming, 1822)
  - Tribe Copsychini (Sundevall, 1872)
    - Alethe – alethes (2 species)
    - Tychaedon – scrub robins (5 species)
    - Cercotrichas – scrub robins (5 species)
    - Copsychus – magpie-robins or shamas (17 species)
  - Tribe Muscicapini (Fleming, 1822)
    - Agricola – flycatchers (2 species)
    - Fraseria – forest flycatchers (8 species)
    - Melaenornis – flycatchers (7 species)
    - Namibornis – single species: Herero chat
    - Empidornis – single species: silverbird
    - Sigelus – single species: fiscal flycatcher
    - Bradornis – flycatchers (3 species)
    - Myopornis – single species: Böhm's flycatcher
    - Artomyias – flycatchers (2 species)
    - Humblotia – single species: Humblot's flycatcher
    - Muscicapa – flycatchers (17 species)
- Subfamily Niltavinae (Sangster, Alström, Forsmark and Olsson, 2010) (Note: The ornithologist Dario Zuccon pointed out that when George Sangster and colleagues erected the name "Niltavinae" for the subfamily, they did not provide a description as required by the International Code of Zoological Nomenclature. Sangster and colleagues subsequently published a description in 2016.)
  - Leucoptilon – single species: white-tailed flycatcher
  - Sholicola – blue robins (2 species)
  - Niltava – niltavas (7 species)
  - Cyanoptila – flycatchers (2 species)
  - Eumyias – blue flycatchers (11 species)
  - Anthipes – flycatchers (2 species)
  - Cyornis – blue flycatchers (32 species)
- Subfamily Erithacinae (G.R. Gray, 1846) – African forest robin assemblage (Note: Dario Zuccon has argued that the correct name for the African forest robins assemblage is Cossyphinae (type genus Cossypha Vigors, 1825) as the name predates Erithacinae (G.R. Gray, 1846).)
  - Erithacus – single species: European robin
  - Swynnertonia – single species: Swynnerton's robin
  - Pogonocichla – single species: white-starred robin
  - Stiphrornis – forest robins (3 species)
  - Cossyphicula – robin-chats (2 species)
  - Chamaetylas – alethes (4 species)
  - Cossypha – robin-chats (8 species)
  - Cichladusa – palm thrushes (3 species)
  - Xenocopsychus – single species: Angola cave chat
  - Dessonornis – robin-chats (4 species)
  - Sheppardia – akalats (11 species)
- Subfamily Saxicolinae (Vigors, 1825)
  - Irania – single species: white-throated robin
  - Luscinia – nightingales and relatives (4 species)
  - Myiomela – robins (3 species)
  - Calliope – rubythroats (5 species)
  - Enicurus – forktails (8 species)
  - Cinclidium – single species: blue-fronted robin
  - Myophonus – whistling thrushes (9 species)
  - Heinrichia – single species: great shortwing
  - Vauriella – jungle flycatchers (3 species)
  - Leonardina – single species: Bagobo babbler
  - Brachypteryx – shortwings (6 species)
  - Larvivora – East and South-East Asian robins (6 species)
  - Ficedula – flycatchers (34 species)
  - Tarsiger – bush robins and bluetails (8 species)
  - Heteroxenicus – single species: Gould's shortwing
  - Phoenicurus – redstarts (14 species)
  - Monticola – rock thrushes (15 species)
  - Saxicola – stonechats and chats (14 species)
  - Campicoloides – single species: buff-streaked chat
  - Emarginata – chats (3 species)
  - Pinarochroa – single species: moorland chat
  - Thamnolaea – single species: mocking cliff chat
  - Myrmecocichla – chats (8 species)
  - Oenanthe – wheatears (32 species)

The cladogram below is based on a molecular phylogenetic study of the family by Min Zhao and collaborators that was published in 2023. Some regions of the phylogenetic tree were not strongly supported by the sequence data. Both the genera included and the number of species in each genera are taken from the list of birds maintained by Frank Gill, Pamela C. Rasmussen and David Donsker on behalf of the International Ornithological Committee (IOC). Muscicapidae probably diverged from Turdidae in the early Miocene, and the four subfamilies (Muscicapinae, Niltavinae, Cossyphinae and Saxicolinae) shared a most recent common ancestor around the middle Miocene.

- Muscicapidae
  - Muscicapinae
    - Copsychini
      - Alethe – alethes (2 species)
      - - Tychaedon – scrub robins (5 species)
        - - Cercotrichas – scrub robins (5 species)
          - Copsychus – magpie-robins, sharmas (17 species)
    - Muscicapini
      - Vauriella goodfellowi – slaty-backed jungle flycatcher (position uncertain)
      - - - Agricola – flycatchers (2 species)
          - - Fraseria – flycatchers (8 species)
            - - Melaenornis – flycatchers (7 species)
              - - Namibornis – herero chat
                - - Empidornis – silverbird
                  - Sigelus – fiscal flycatcher
        - - - Bradornis – flycatchers (3 species)
            - - Myopornis – Böhm's flycatcher
              - Artomyias – flycatchers (2 species)
          - Muscicapa – flycatchers (17 species) & Humblotia – Humblot's flycatcher
  - - Niltavinae
      - Leucoptilon – white-tailed flycatcher
      - - - Sholicola – blue robins (2 species)
          - - Niltava – niltavas (7 species)
            - - Cyanoptila – flycatchers (2 species)
              - Eumyias – flycatchers (6 species)
        - - Anthipes – flycatchers (2 species)
          - Cyornis – blue flycatchers, jungle flycatchers (36 species) many taxa unsampled
    - - Cossyphinae
        - Erithacus – European robin
        - - - Swynnertonia – Swynnerton's robin
            - Pogonocichla – white-starred robin
          - - - Stiphrornis – forest robin (position uncertain)
              - - Cossyphicula – robin-chats (2 species)
                - - Chamaetylas – alethes (4 species)
                  - Cossypha - robin-chats (8 species)
            - - - Cossypha cyanocampter – blue-shouldered robin-chat (position uncertain)
                - - Cichladusa – palm thrushes (3 species)
                  - - Xenocopsychus – Angola cave chat
                    - Dessonornis – robin-chats, ground robins (4 species)
              - Sheppardia – akalats (11 species)
      - Saxicolinae
        - - - - Irania – white-throated robin
              - Luscinia – nightingales, redstart, bluethroat (4 species)
            - Calliope – rubythroats (5 species)
          - - - Enicurus – forktails (8 species)
              - - Cinclidium – blue-fronted robin
                - Myophonus – whistling thrushes (9 species)
            - - Myiomela – robins (3 species)
              - - - - Heinrichia – great shortwing
                    - Vauriella – jungle flycatchers (3 species) & Leonardina – Bagobo babbler
                  - - Brachypteryx – shortwings (6 species)
                    - Larvivora – robins (6 species)
                - Ficedula – flycatchers (34 species)
        - - Tarsiger – bush robins, bluetails (8 species)
          - - Heteroxenicus – Gould's shortwing
            - - Phoenicurus – redstarts (14 species)
              - - Monticola – rock thrushes (13 species)
                - - Saxicola – bush chats, stonechats (14 species)
                  - - - Campicoloides – buff-streaked chat
                      - Emarginata – chats (3 species)
                    - - - Pinarochroa – moorland chat
                        - Myrmecocichla – chats (8 species) & Thamnolaea – mocking cliff chat
                      - Oenanthe – wheatears (32 species)

== Description ==
The appearance of these birds is very varied, but they mostly have weak songs and harsh calls. They are small to medium birds, ranging from 9 to 22 cm in length. Many species are dull brown in colour, but the plumage of some can be much brighter, especially in the males. Most have broad, flattened bills suited to catching insects in flight, although the few ground-foraging species typically have finer bills.

Old World flycatchers live in almost every environment with a suitable supply of trees, from dense forest to open scrub, and even the montane woodland of the Himalayas. The more northerly species migrate south in winter, ensuring a continuous diet of insects.

Depending on the species, their nests are either well-constructed cups placed in a tree or cliff ledge, or simply lining in a pre-existing tree hole. The hole-nesting species tend to lay larger clutches, with an average of eight eggs, rather than just two to five.
