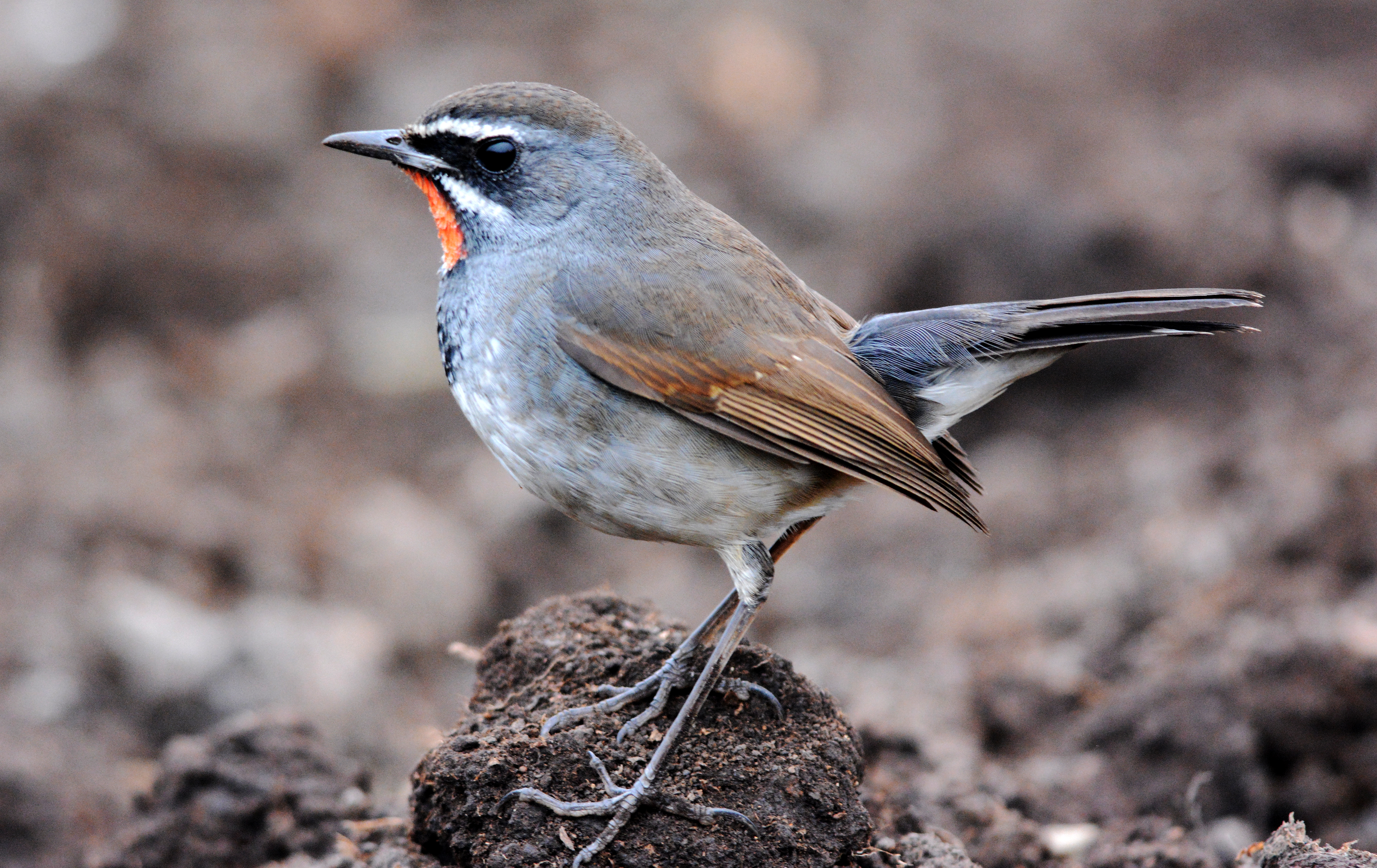

Conservation status
- Least Concern (IUCN 3.1)

Scientific classification
- Kingdom: Animalia
- Phylum: Chordata
- Class: Aves
- Order: Passeriformes
- Family: Muscicapidae
- Genus: Calliope
- Species: C. tschebaiewi

Binomial name
- Calliope tschebaiewi Przhevalsky, 1876

Synonyms
- Calliope pectoralis tschebaiewi; Luscinia tschebaiewi

= Chinese rubythroat =

Species of bird

The Chinese rubythroat (Calliope tschebaiewi) is a small passerine bird in the family Muscicapidae. It is closely related to the Siberian rubythroat which however lacks the distinctive white tail-tips and white tail bases. It was also previously considered conspecific with the Himalayan rubythroat, together called the white-tailed rubythroat. It is found along the Himalayan ranges from Pakistan to Myanmar.

== Taxonomy ==
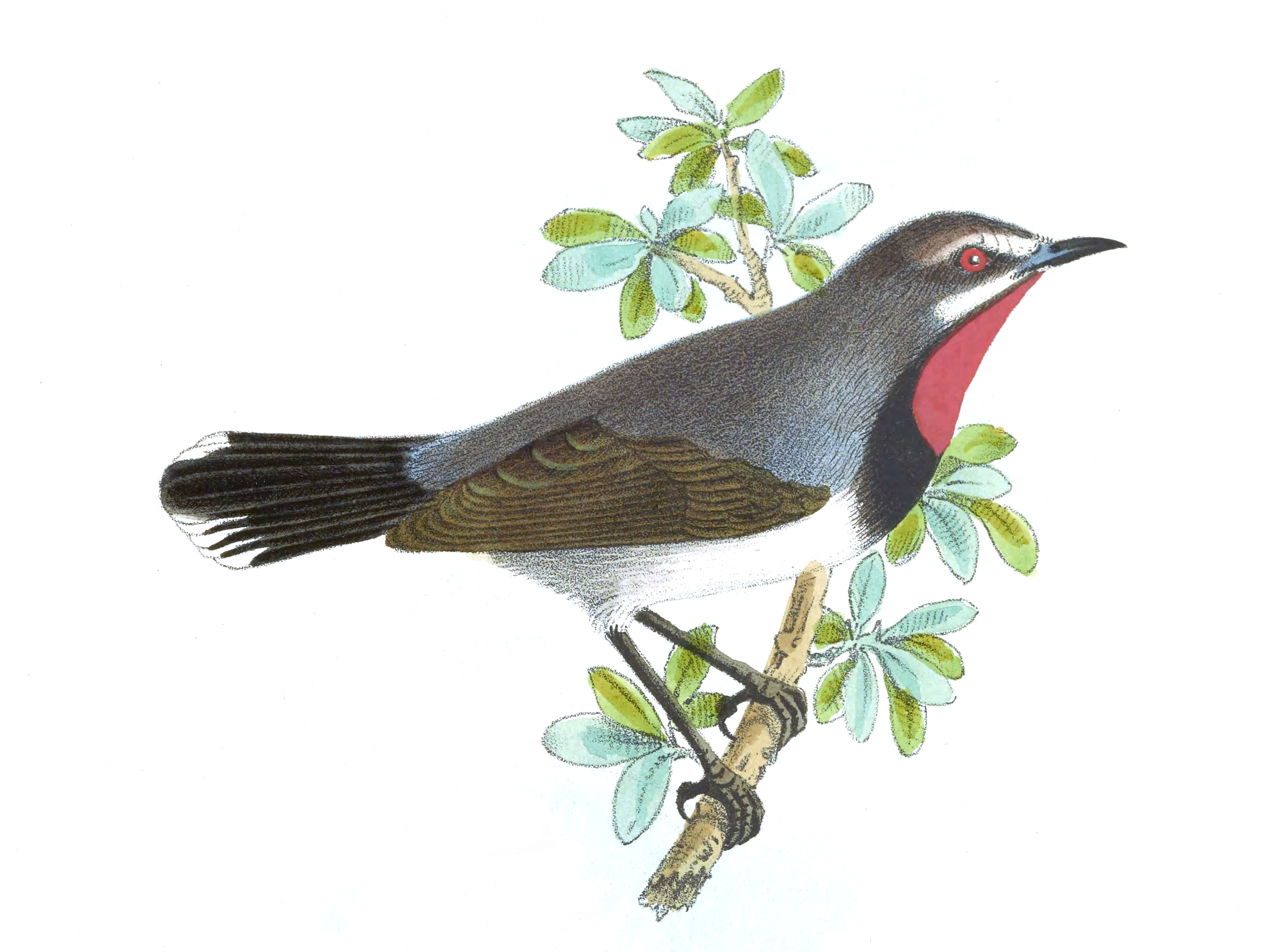
Luscinia pectoralis tschebaiewi, a synonym of Calliope tschebaiewi in a 1877 illustration.

The first formal description of the Chinese rubythroat was by the Russian geographer Nikolay Przhevalsky in 1876. He introduced the current binomial name Calliope tschebaiewi. The specific epithet tschebaiewi is in honour of the Cossack Pamfili Tschebaeiv who accompanied Przevalsky on his travels. The Chinese rubythroat was subsequently considered as a subspecies of the Himalayan rubythroat (Calliope pectoralis). The species complex was given the English name "white-tailed rubythroat" and placed in the genus Luscinia. A large molecular phylogenetic study published in 2010 found that the Luscinia was not monophyletic. The genus was therefore split and several species including the white-tailed rubythroat were moved to the reinstated genus Calliope. Another study published in 2016 compared the mitochondrial DNA, vocalization and morphology of several Calliope pectoralis subspecies. Based on their results the authors recommended that C. p. tschebaiewi be promoted to species rank with the English name Chinese rubythroat. At the same time the English name "white-tailed rubythroat" was changed to Himalayan rubythroat. The species is monotypic.

== Description ==
The male is slaty brown above with a white forehead and supercilium. The wings are brownish and the tail is blackish with white base and tips. The sides of the throat and breast are black and the centre of the chin and throat is scarlet. Each of the black feathers on the breast is narrowly fringed with grey. The belly and vent are white. The female is dull, brownish grey above with a diffuse supercilium and smoky underparts. The centre of the throat is whitish as is the short moustachial stripe.

== Distribution and habitat ==
It is found in Central Asia and the Indian subcontinent, ranging across Bangladesh, Bhutan, India, Myanmar, Nepal, Pakistan, Russia, and Thailand. The move up north and into higher altitudes in summer and move into lower elevations to the south in winter. It breeds along the edge of the Tibetan plateau winters to its south from Nepal to Assam. Its natural habitat is open woodland and scrub.

== Behaviour and ecology ==
Adults are shy although sometimes perching in the open. They are usually seen singly or in pairs during the breeding season. They feed mainly on small insects including beetles and ants. During the breeding season the male sings through the day from the top of an exposed perch. The song is a series of squeaky notes with a great deal of variation. Females produce an upward inflected whistle that follows a short and gruff note. The alarm call is a sharp yapping skyap.

In the Tien Shan region, the Chinese rubythroat is found in thickets of juniper elfin at altitudes of 2500 to 2700 m on gently sloping land. The breeding season is in summer and nests are built in shrubs near dense stands of trees. The nest is placed in the middle of a shrub and sometimes on the ground in a dense tussock. The typical nest is a loose and large ball like with an entrance on the side but is sometimes cup like with an open top. The nest is built mainly by the female. A clutch of 4 to 6 eggs is laid. The eggs are greenish blue with rusty dots forming a ring near the broad end. Incubation is mostly by the female but the nestlings are fed by both parents. The eggs hatch after around 14 days and the young leave the nest when they fledge after about 16 days. The parents forage close to the nest and the young are mainly fed with hairy caterpillars. Rubythroats have been observed to abandon their nest when a cuckoo (Cuculus canorus) laid an egg in their nest. Martens and stoats sometimes destroy nests and prey on the young.
