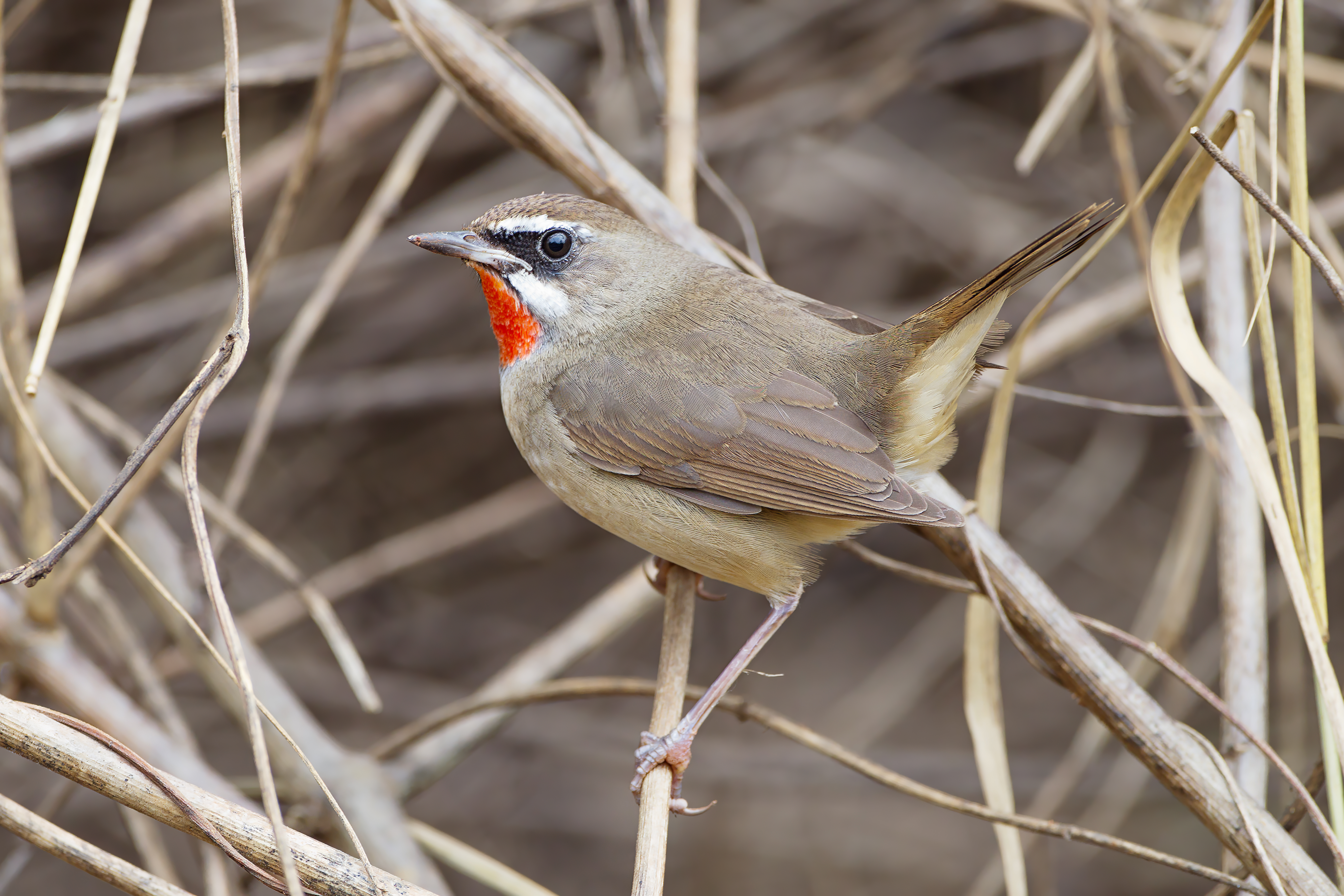
- Male Siberian rubythroat (Calliope calliope)

Scientific classification
- Kingdom: Animalia
- Phylum: Chordata
- Class: Aves
- Order: Passeriformes
- Family: Muscicapidae
- Subfamily: Saxicolinae
- Genus: Calliope; Gould, 1836

Type species
- Calliope lathamii Gould, 1836

= Calliope (genus) =

Genus of birds

Calliope is a genus of passerine birds in the Old World flycatcher family Muscicapidae.

The species were previously placed in the genus Luscinia. A large molecular phylogenetic study published in 2010 found that Luscinia as defined in 2003 by Edward C. Dickinson was not monophyletic. The genus Calliope, with the type species, Calliope calliope, was reinstated to accommodate a well-defined clade. Although the blackthroat (Calliope obscura) had not been included in the 2010 phylogenetic analysis, a subsequent study found that the firethroat and the blackthroat were sister species and not colour morphs of the same species as some publications had previously suggested.

The genus Calliope was introduced by the English ornithologist John Gould in 1836. Calliope, from classical Greek meaning beautiful-voiced, was one of the muses in Greek mythology and presided over eloquence and heroic poetry.

The genus contains the following five species:

- Himalayan rubythroat (Calliope pectoralis)
- Chinese rubythroat (Calliope tschebaiewi) - formerly considered as a subspecies of the Himalayan rubythroat
- Siberian rubythroat (Calliope calliope)
- Firethroat (Calliope pectardens)
- Blackthroat (Calliope obscura)
