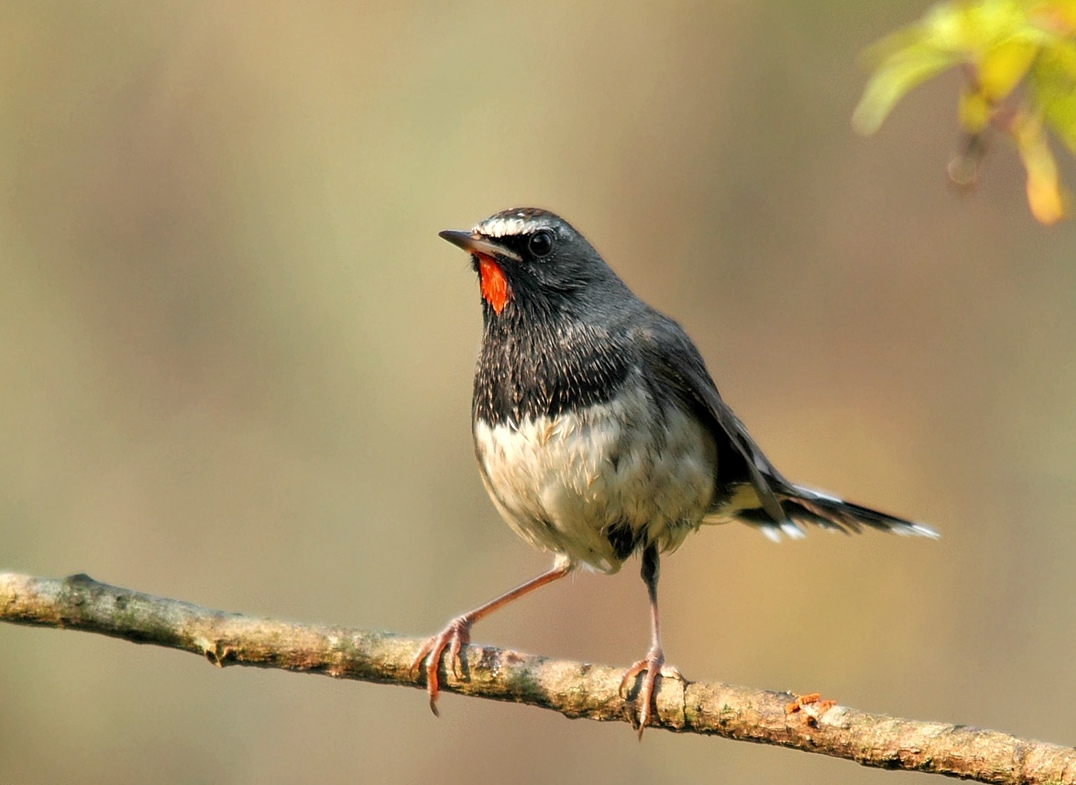
- Male of the nominate subspecies (Dehradun, India)

Conservation status
- Least Concern (IUCN 3.1)

Scientific classification
- Kingdom: Animalia
- Phylum: Chordata
- Class: Aves
- Order: Passeriformes
- Family: Muscicapidae
- Genus: Calliope
- Species: C. pectoralis

Binomial name
- Calliope pectoralis Gould, 1837

Subspecies
- See text

Synonyms
- Luscinia pectoralis

= Himalayan rubythroat =

Species of bird

The Himalayan rubythroat (Calliope pectoralis) is a species of passerine bird in the family Muscicapidae. It is closely related to the Siberian rubythroat which however lacks the distinctive white tail-tips and white tail bases. It was also previously considered conspecific with the Chinese rubythroat, together called the white-tailed rubythroat. It is found along the Tien Shan and Himalayan ranges from Afghanistan to Myanmar. Three subspecies are recognized across its wide range.

== Taxonomy ==
The first formal description of the Himalayan rubythroat was by the English ornithologist and bird artist John Gould in 1837. He coined the binomial name Calliope pectoralis. The species was given the English name "white-tailed rubythroat" and moved to the genus Luscinia. A large molecular phylogenetic study published in 2010 found that the genus Luscinia was not monophyletic. The genus was therefore split and several species including the white-tailed rubythroat were returned to the reinstated genus Calliope. Another study published in 2016 compared the mitochondrial DNA, vocalization and morphology of several Calliope pectoralis subspecies. Based on their results the authors recommended that C. p. tschebaiewi be promoted to species rank with the English name Chinese rubythroat. At the same time the English name "white-tailed rubythroat" was changed to Himalayan rubythroat.

There are three subspecies:

- C. p. ballioni (Severtsov, 1873) – Tien Shan mountains of central Asia to northeast Afghanistan
- C. p. pectoralis Gould, 1837 – Himalaya from northern Pakistan to central Nepal
- C. p. confusa (Hartert, 1910) – Himalaya from eastern Nepal to Bhutan

== Description ==
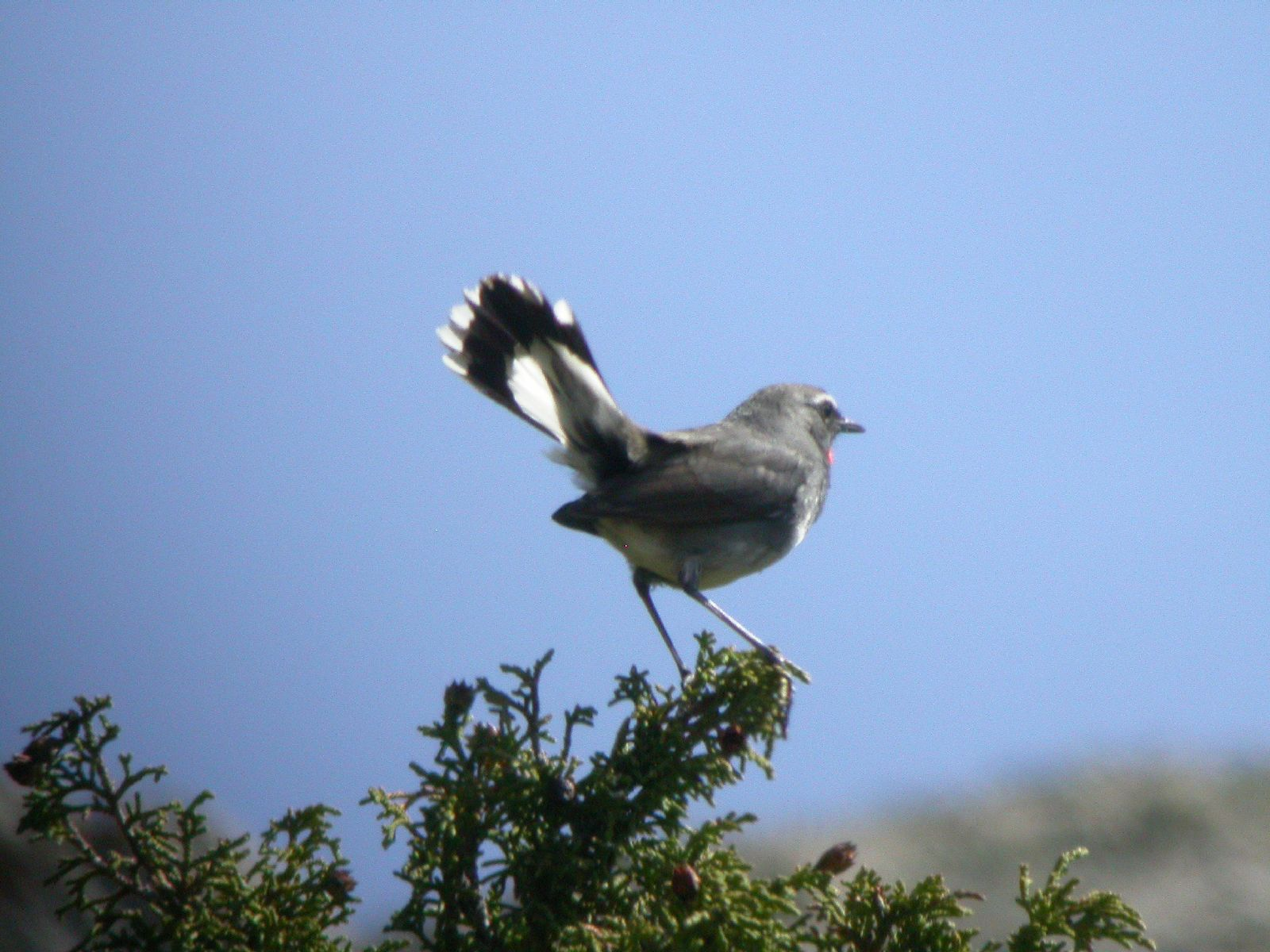
Male of the subspecies C. p. ballioni in Kazakhstan

The male is slaty brown above with a white forehead and supercilium. The wings are brownish and the tail is blackish with white base and tips. The sides of the throat and breast are black and the centre of the chin and throat is scarlet. Each of the black feathers on the breast is narrowly fringed with grey. The belly and vent are white. The female is dull, brownish grey above with a diffuse supercilium and smoky underparts. The centre of the throat is whitish and a short whitish moustachial stripe is present in the eastern populations.

The subspecies found in Afghanistan and the Tien Shan, C. p. ballioni, has the male paler than the nominate subspecies of the western Himalayas. In the central and eastern Himalayas of Sikkim and Bhutan, C. p. confusa, is similar but has the male blacker above with a more prominent white forehead. It has a face pattern that resembles that of the Siberian rubythroat and a strong white submoustachial streak. The thin supercilia over the eyes do not meet at the forehead. Being rather distinctive and possibly closer to the Siberian rubythroat, the taxonomy and placement of this population as well as the overall treatment of this species pair has been questioned.

== Distribution and habitat ==
It is found in Central Asia and the Indian subcontinent, ranging across Afghanistan, Bangladesh, Bhutan, India, Kazakhstan, Myanmar, Nepal, Pakistan, Russia, Tajikistan, Thailand, Turkmenistan, and Uzbekistan. The move up north and into higher altitudes in summer and move into lower elevations to the south in winter. Subspecies ballioni is found in the western and northern part of its range while the nominate population occurs along the western and central Himalayas in India. The subspecies C. p. confusa which may well represent clinal variation in the darkness of the upper plumage of the male is found from Sikkim to Assam. Its natural habitat is open woodland and scrub. They may sometimes occur in summer on the lower plains but a record from further south at Londa near Goa has been determined as a misidentified Siberian rubythroat. A single bird was observed by Col Rohit Sharma at Wan Sanctuary, Melghat Tiger Reserve on 29 January 2023 during first bird survey in the reserve.

== Behaviour and ecology ==
Adults are shy although sometimes perching in the open. They are usually seen singly or in pairs during the breeding season. They feed mainly on small insects including beetles and ants. During the breeding season the male sings through the day from the top of an exposed perch. The song is a series of squeaky notes with a great deal of variation. Females produce an upward inflected whistle that follows a short and gruff note. The alarm call is a sharp yapping skyap.

In the Tien Shan region, the Himalayan rubythroat is found in thickets of juniper elfin at altitudes of 2500 to 2700 m on gently sloping land. The breeding season is in summer and nests are built in shrubs near dense stands of trees. The nest is placed in the middle of a shrub and sometimes on the ground in a dense tussock. The typical nest is a loose and large ball like with an entrance on the side but is sometimes cup like with an open top. The nest is built mainly by the female. A clutch of 4 to 6 eggs is laid. The eggs are greenish blue with rusty dots forming a ring near the broad end. Incubation is mostly by the female but the nestlings are fed by both parents. The eggs hatch after around 14 days and the young leave the nest when they fledge after about 16 days. The parents forage close to the nest and the young are mainly fed with hairy caterpillars. Rubythroats have been observed to abandon their nest when a cuckoo (Cuculus canorus) laid an egg in their nest. Martens and stoats sometimes destroy nests and prey on the young.

== In culture ==
The summer song of the male inspired the 1995 composition Summoning Dawn by Scottish composer and birdcall recorder Magnus Robb who was inspired by the tune he noticed by playing the calls at a fourth of its normal speed.
