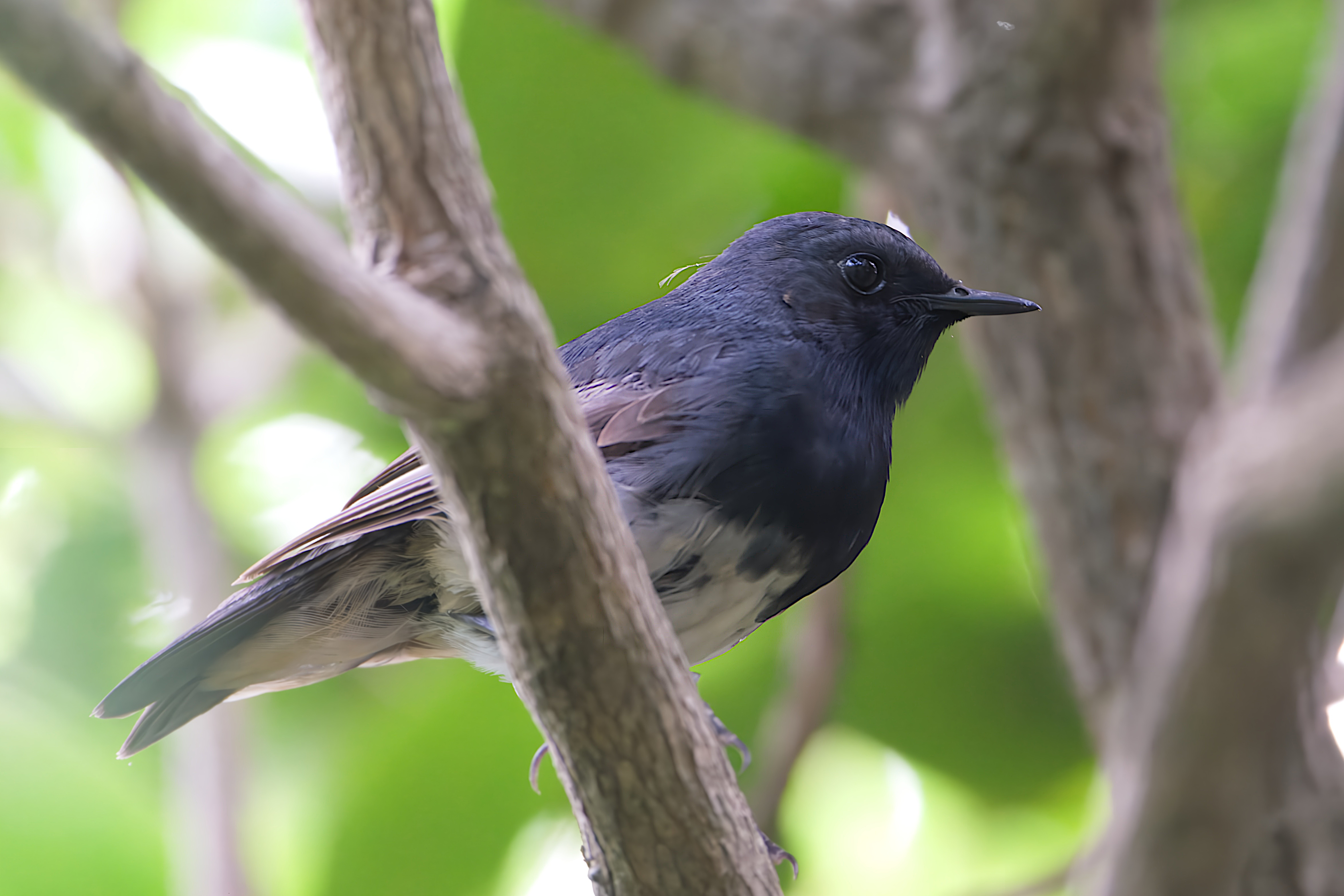
- Male, in Luoyang, Henan Province, China.

Conservation status
- Vulnerable (IUCN 3.1)

Scientific classification
- Kingdom: Animalia
- Phylum: Chordata
- Class: Aves
- Order: Passeriformes
- Family: Muscicapidae
- Genus: Calliope
- Species: C. obscura

Binomial name
- Calliope obscura (Berezowski & Bianchi, 1891)

Synonyms
- Luscinia obscura Erithacus obscurus

= Blackthroat =

Species of bird

The blackthroat (Calliope obscura), also known as the black-throated robin or black-throated blue robin, is a species of bird in the family Muscicapidae. It breeds in north-central China but its wintering grounds are uncertain. It has been recorded as a vagrant in northwest Thailand. Its natural habitat is bamboo thickets within coniferous forest at altitudes of 3000–3,400 metres. It is threatened by habitat loss.

== Taxonomy ==
The first formal description of the blackthroat was by the Russian ornithologists Valentin Bianchi and Mikhail Berezovski in 1891 who coined the binomial name Larvivora obscura. The species was later placed in the genus Luscinia but when a molecular phylogenetic study published in 2010 found that Luscinia was not monophyletic the genus was split and several species including the blackthroat were moved to the reinstated genus Calliope.

The blackthroat is closely related to the firethroat, another species of chat which only breeds in China. In the past, some authorities have even considered the two taxa to represent colour morphs of the same species due to their parapatric ranges and similarity in their vocalisations. However, genetic studies have shown that they are sufficiently distinct genetically to support their placement as separate species.

== Description ==
Adult blackthroats are 12.5–14.5 cm (4.9–5.7 in) long. Breeding males have slate-blue upperparts, white underparts, black faces, throats, and breasts, yellow bellies, and black tails. There is likely a non-breeding male plumage, but it has not been documented yet. Females have greyish-brown upperparts and whitish-buff underparts. The bill is black and the legs are pink-grey.

== Distribution ==
The blackthroat breeds only in central China, where it is known from the provinces of Gansu, Shaanxi, and Sichuan. Wintering individuals have been seen in Thailand, while passage migrants have been seen in Yunnan.

== Conservation ==
The blackthroat was discovered in 1891, but for the next 120 years only a handful of individuals were seen and to date no female has been conclusively identified. So little was known of it that it earned the title " Asia's most enigmatic robin". In June 2011 a team of scientists discovered its breeding grounds in the Qinling Mountains, Shaanxi Province, north central China. Seven singing males were seen in Foping and a further seven in Changqing Nature Reserves- almost equal to the total number seen previously. The current population is estimated to be 2500–10000 adults.
