= White-tailed rubythroat =

The white-tailed rubythroat has been split into the following species:

- Chinese rubythroat, Calliope tschebaiewi
- Himalayan rubythroat, Calliope pectoralis
