= Firethroat =

Conservation status
- Near Threatened (IUCN 3.1)

Scientific classification
- Kingdom: Animalia
- Phylum: Chordata
- Class: Aves
- Order: Passeriformes
- Family: Muscicapidae
- Genus: Calliope
- Species: C. pectardens

Binomial name
- Calliope pectardens David, 1877

Synonyms
- Luscinia davidi Erithacus pectardens Luscinia pectardens

Species of bird

The firethroat (Calliope pectardens) also known as David's rubythroat or Père David's orangethroat is a species of passerine bird in the family Muscicapidae, found in western and central parts of China. It breeds in Sichuan, China, and winters primarily in the Indian subcontinent. Its wintering range spans across Bangladesh, Bhutan, India, Nepal, Tibet and Myanmar. Its natural habitat is temperate forests. It is threatened by habitat loss.

== Taxonomy ==
The first formal description of the firethroat was by the Catholic priest and zoologist Armand David in 1877 who coined the current binomial name Calliope pectardens. The species was later placed in the genus Luscinia but when a molecular phylogenetic study published in 2010 found that Luscinia was not monophyletic the genus was split and several species including the firethroat were moved to the reinstated genus Calliope. Calliope, from classical Greek meaning beautiful-voiced, was one of the muses in Greek mythology. The specific name pectardens is from the Latin pectus for "breast" and ardens meaning "fiery" or "glowing".

The firethroat is closely related to the blackthroat, another species of chat which only breeds in China. In the past, some authorities have even considered the two taxa to represent colour morphs of the same species due to their parapatric ranges and similarity in their vocalisations. However, genetic studies have shown that they are sufficiently distinct genetically to support their placement as separate species.

== Description ==
Adult firethroats are 14 cm (5.5 in) long on average and weigh around 15 g (0.53 oz). Adult males have slate-colored upperparts, brown-black wings, white to whitish-brown bellies, and a brown-black tail with a whitish rump. All the tail coverts, except for the central pair, have white windows. During the non-breeding season, males have uniformly whitish-brown underparts and slaty upperparts, with brown on the sides of the head. During the breeding season, they have black on the face and down the sides of the neck, with a small patch of white on the upper neck. The throat and breast are bright orange-red. Females have olive-brown upperparts, buff underparts, whitish bellies, and uniformly brownish tails. The bill is black and the legs are lead-coloured.

== Distribution ==
The firethroat breeds only in China, where its breeding range stretches from Gansu, Sichuan, and Yunnan west to Tibet. Recent records of breeding populations have all been from Sichuan. The chat winters in Northeast India and Bangladesh, occurring transiently in Bhutan and portions of northern Myanmar during migration. In India, it has been recorded from the states of West Bengal, Meghalaya, and Arunachal Pradesh. Vagrants have been documented from Thailand.

In China, it inhabits montane forest, bamboo, and dense shrubbery located along streams and in valleys. While wintering, it inhabits thickets, scrub, and mangroves. Breeding birds live at elevations of 2,800–3,700 m (9,200–12,100 ft), while those in Bangladesh are found at low elevations and a Burmese record was at 150 m (490 ft).
