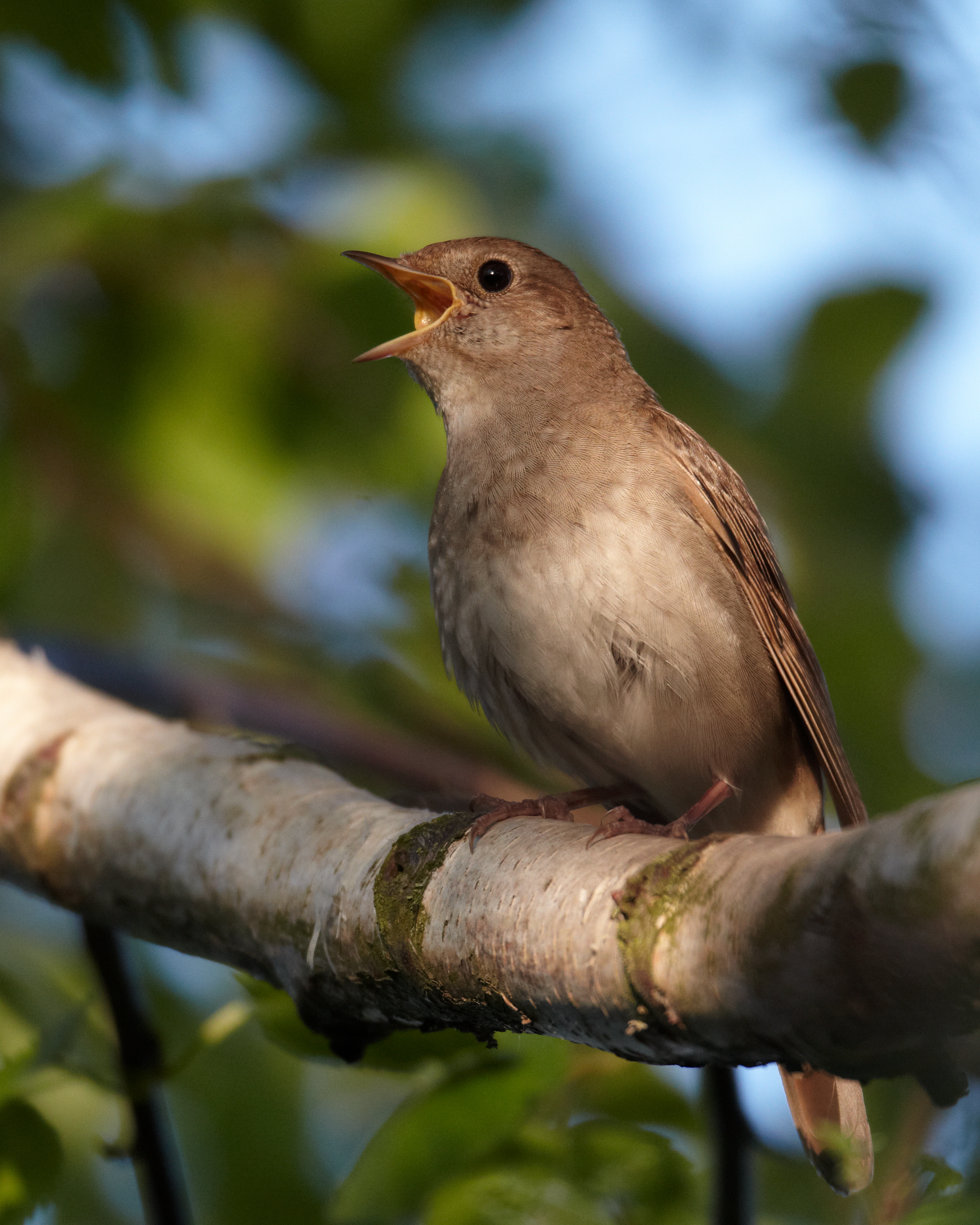

Conservation status
- Least Concern (IUCN 3.1)

Scientific classification
- Kingdom: Animalia
- Phylum: Chordata
- Class: Aves
- Order: Passeriformes
- Family: Muscicapidae
- Genus: Luscinia
- Species: L. luscinia

Binomial name
- Luscinia luscinia (Linnaeus, 1758)
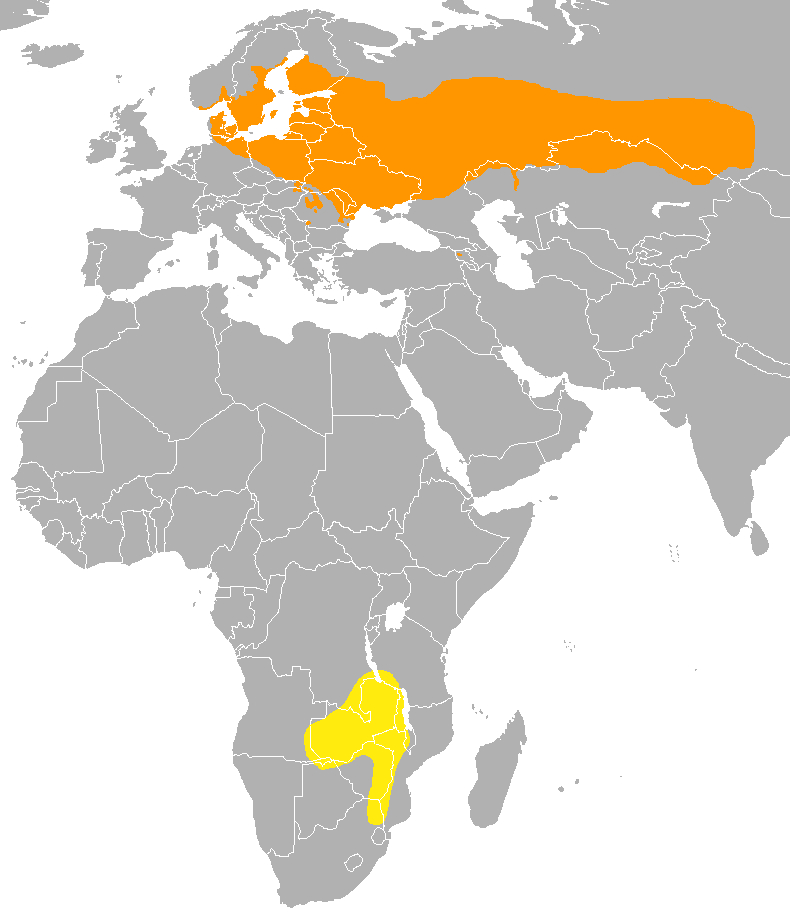
- Distribution of the Luscinia luscinia. Orange: breeding (summer) range, yellow: non-breeding (winter) range.

Synonyms
- Motacilla luscinia Linnaeus, 1758

Audio
- Song

= Thrush nightingale =

Species of bird

The thrush nightingale (Luscinia luscinia), also known as the sprosser, is a small passerine bird in the Old World flycatcher family. It is a migratory species breeding in forests in Europe and the Palearctic and overwintering in Africa. An insectivore, it nests near the ground in dense undergrowth. Its distribution is more northerly than the very closely related common nightingale (Luscinia megarhynchos), which it closely resembles in appearance. Hybrids between the two have occurred in areas where their ranges overlap.

The thrush nightingale is similar in size to the European robin. Sexes are similar, both being plain greyish-brown above and white and greyish-brown below. Its greyer tones, giving a cloudy appearance to the underside, and lack of the common nightingale's obvious rufous tail side patches are the clearest plumage differences from that species. It also has a similar but somewhat more solemn song than that of L. megarhynchos. The nightingales, and similar small European species, are often called chats.

== Taxonomy ==
The thrush nightingale belongs to a distinctive group of Old World flycatchers, known as chats, that were formerly thought to be thrushes. It was formally described in 1758 by the Swedish naturalist Carl Linnaeus in the tenth edition of his Systema Naturae. He placed it with the wagtails in the genus Motacilla and coined the binomial name Motacilla luscinia. Linnaeus specied the type location as "Europae frondosis" (leafy Europe) but this was restricted to Sweden by German ornithologist Ernst Hartert in 1910. The thrush nightingale is now one of the four species placed in the genus Luscinia that was introduced by the English naturalist Thomas Forster in 1817. The species is considered to be monotypic: no subspecies are recognised. Luscinia, both the generic and specific name, is Latin for the common nightingale (Luscinia megarhynchos). The common name "Nightingale" is derived from "night", and the Old English galan, "to sing".

== Description ==
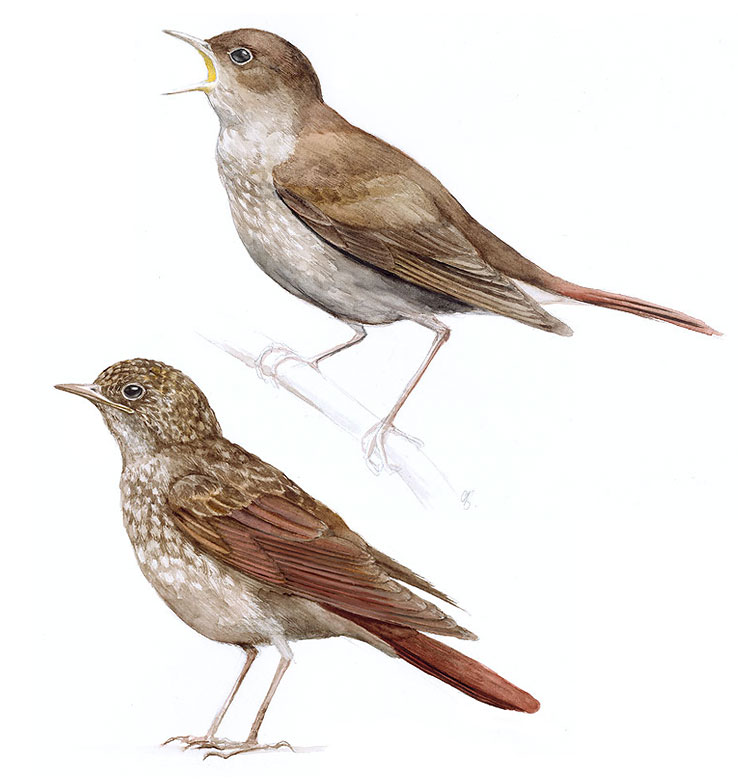
A singing male above and a juvenile below

An adult thrush nightingale is about 16 centimetres (6.3 in) long with a wingspan of approximately 18 centimetres (7.1 in). The head, nape and the whole of the upper parts of the thrush nightingale are dark brown with a slight olive tinge. The colour is much deeper than that of the nightingale and is not at all rufous. The upper tail-coverts are less olivaceous and the tail feathers are dark rufous-brown. The lores and ear-coverts are brownish-black and the chin and throat are pale buff or whitish, mottled with brown, and are paler in colour than the nightingale. The sides of the throat are spotted brown and the pale feathers of the breast have brown central bands giving the breast a mottled appearance. The under tail-coverts are buff, sometimes barred or marked with brown. The wing feathers and wing-coverts are dark brown and less rufous than the nightingale. The beak, legs and feet are brown and the irises are dark brown. The sexes are similar to each other in appearance and the juveniles are darker and more mottled. There is a single moult in July and August at the end of the breeding season.

=== Voice ===
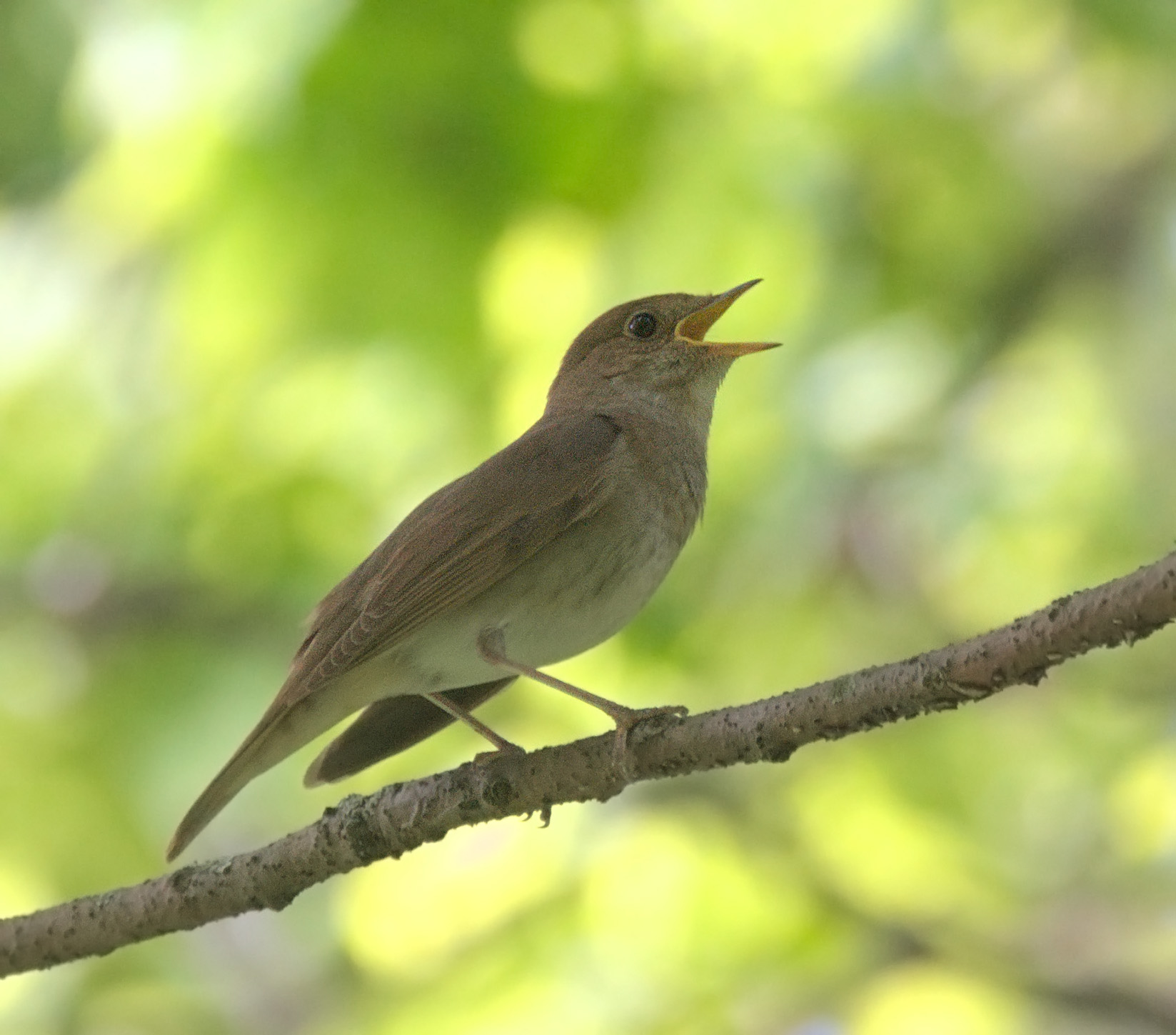

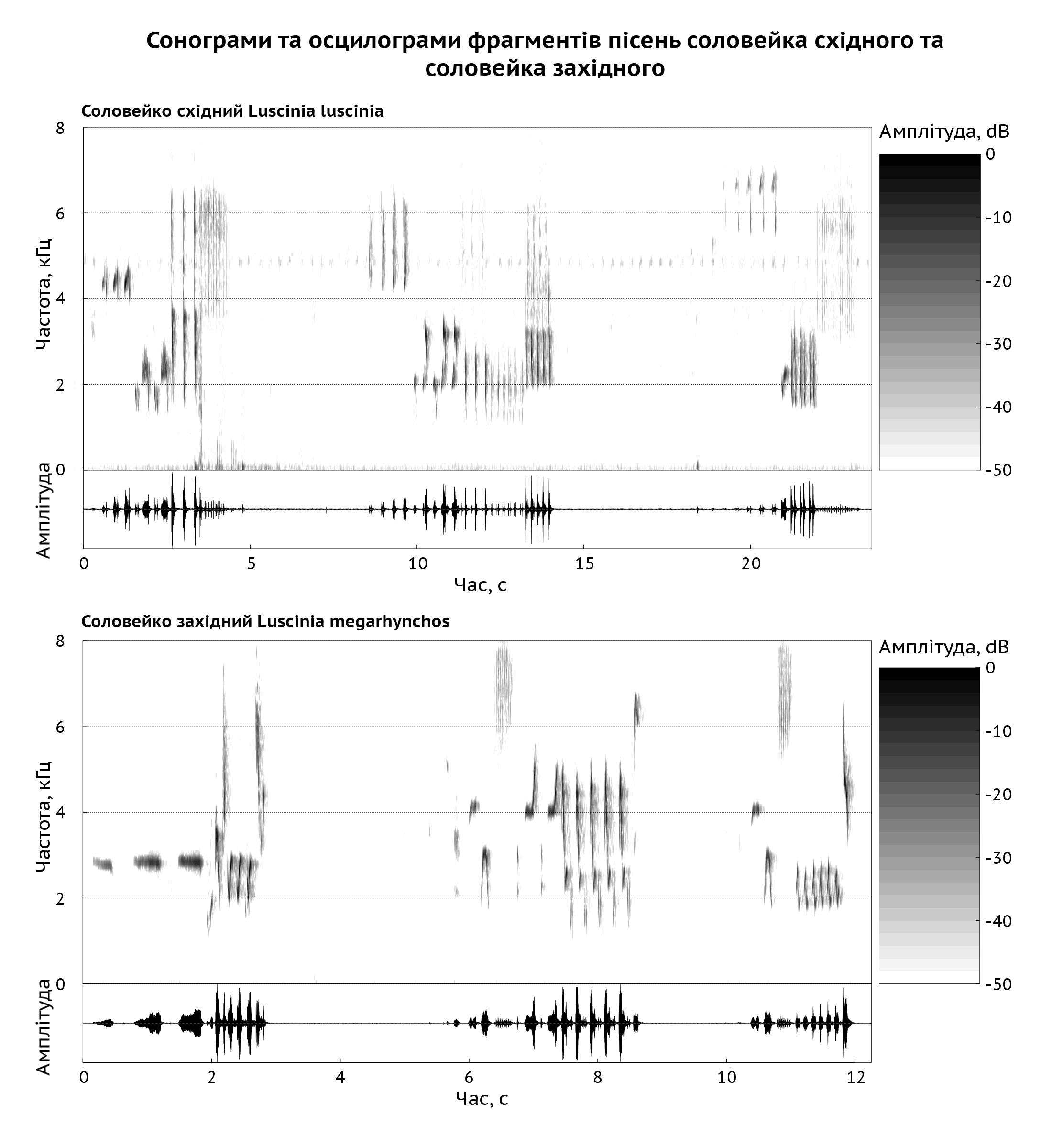
The sonograms of the thrush nightingale (L. luscinia) and the common nightingale (L. megarhynchos) singing help to distinguish these two species by voice definitely.

The male's song is loud, with a range of whistles, trills and clicks and includes a flute-like "pioo" with a pure bell-like tone. It is sometimes interrupted by a rasping "dserr" sound and is rather solemn as compared to that of the common nightingale. The song does not have that bird's loud whistling crescendo and is quite distinctive. It is also sometimes sung in the bird's winter quarters. The call-note "whit" resembles that of the common nightingale but is higher pitched and more abrupt.

== Distribution and habitat ==
The thrush nightingale is a migrant species. It breeds in eastern Europe and the western part of temperate Asia. The northern limit of its summer range extends to Denmark, southern Finland, Norway and Sweden, the Baltic States, the Republic of Karelia, Kostroma, Vologda, Perm, Kazakhstan, Turkestan and Altai. The southern limit extends from Austria and the Czech Republic, through Romania, Bulgaria, southern Russia, Ukraine, the Crimea and northern Caucasus. It overwinters in Africa south of the Sahara. It is an occasional visitor to the British Isles.

In its breeding range, the thrush nightingale is found in damp deciduous woodland typically with alder and birch. It favours thick undergrowth with brambles, dense shrubs and tangled vegetation in swampy places and near water. In its winter quarters it is found in dense patches of thorn bush, especially in valley bottoms near water courses, and sometimes in thick vegetation at the edge of woodland.

The bird is a host of the acanthocephalan intestinal parasite Apororhynchus silesiacus.

== Behaviour ==
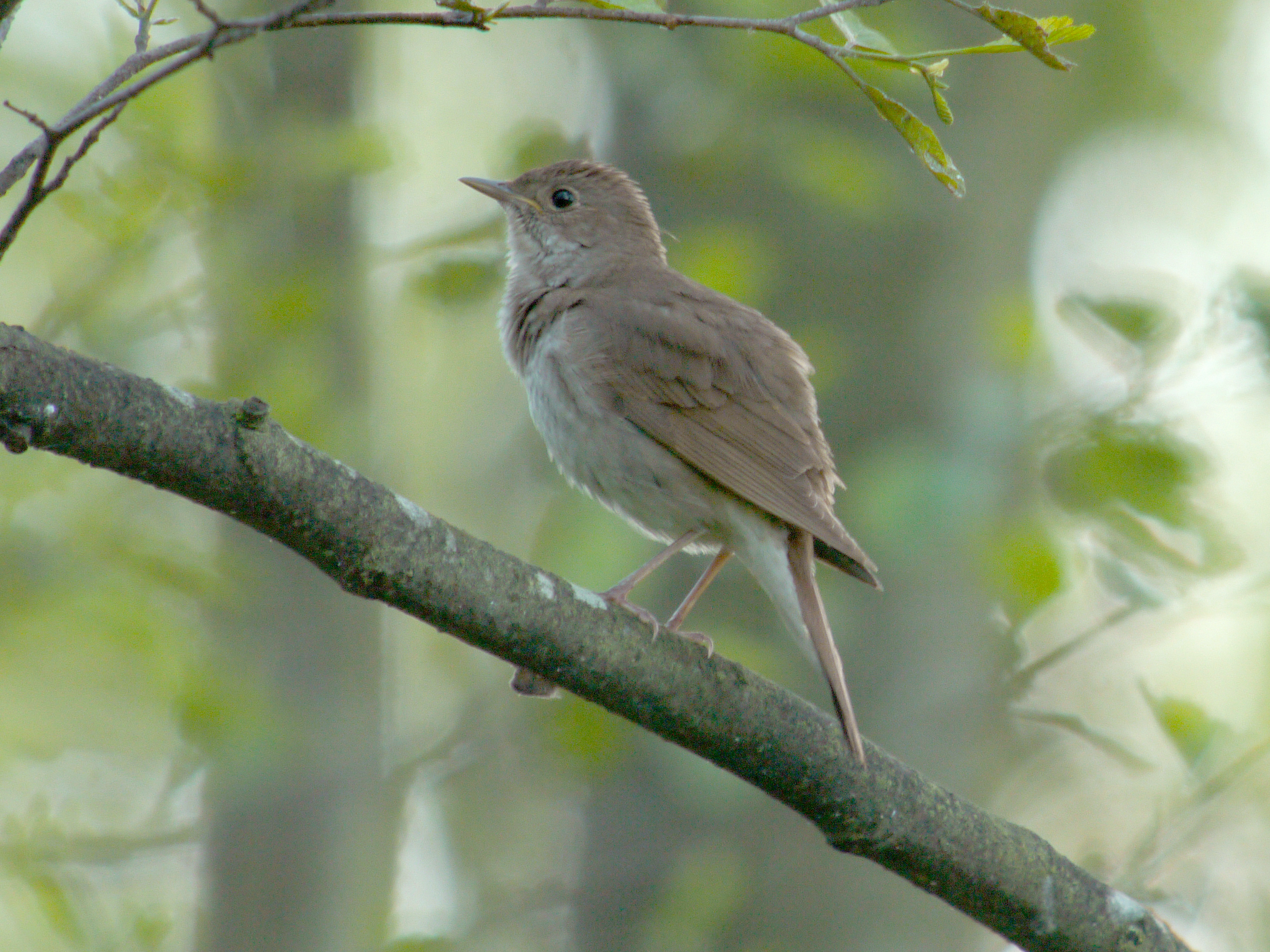
In Poland

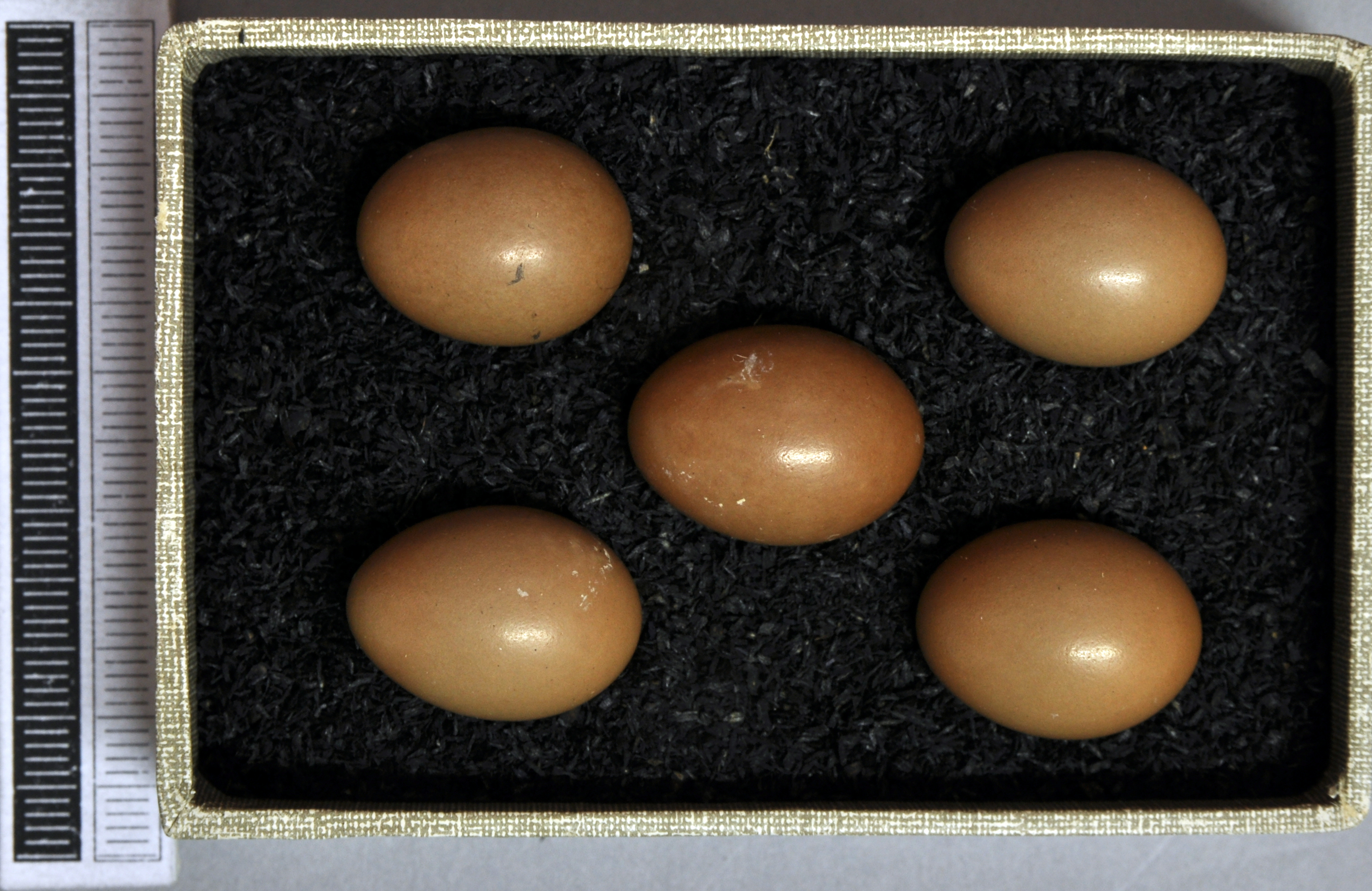
Eggs, Collection Museum Wiesbaden, Germany

=== Food and feeding ===
The thrush nightingale feeds chiefly on the ground taking earthworms, spiders and the adults, larvae and pupae of insects such as beetles, small moths, ants and flies. In the autumn, the berries of currants (Ribes spp.) and elders (Sambucus spp.) are also eaten. Before crossing the Sahara on its migration, thrush nightingales build up their fat reserves. It has been found experimentally that magnetic cues may stimulate the birds to do this. A simulation of the magnetic field found in northern Egypt encouraged birds preparing to migrate from Sweden to further build up their body fat.

=== Breeding ===
The thrush nightingale breeds in damp forests, nesting on the ground, often in the middle of a bed of stinging nettles (Urtica dioica). The nest rests on a platform of dead leaves and is composed of dead grass stalks, bents (Agrostis spp.), sedges and stems, lined with finer material. It is built by the female which lays four or five (occasionally six) eggs. These are a milky-blue colour, usually plain but sometimes with a slight speckling of rusty-brown and measure an average of 21.7 by 16.2 millimetres (0.85 in × 0.64 in). The hen incubates the eggs which hatch in about thirteen days. The young are fed by both parents and fledge when about eleven days old, but are not fully independent for another twelve days or so.

== Status ==
BirdLife International estimates that there are between 11 and 20 million thrush nightingales in Europe and that, as Europe forms somewhere between 50% and 74% of the bird's global range, the total world population may be between 15 and 41 million individuals. In Europe, the population seems to be increasing slightly. The bird is considered to be of Least Concern by the International Union for Conservation of Nature IUCN.
