= Luscinia pliocaenica =

Luscinia pliocaenica Temporal range: Pliocene

Scientific classification
- Kingdom: Animalia
- Phylum: Chordata
- Class: Aves
- Order: Passeriformes
- Family: Muscicapidae
- Genus: Luscinia
- Species: †L. pliocaenica

Binomial name
- †Luscinia pliocaenica Kessler, 2013

Extinct species of bird

Luscinia pliocaenica is an extinct species of Luscinia that inhabited Hungary during the Neogene period.

== Etymology ==
The specific epithet "pliocaenica" is derived from the age of the fossil sites this species has been found on. The sites were from the Pliocene.
