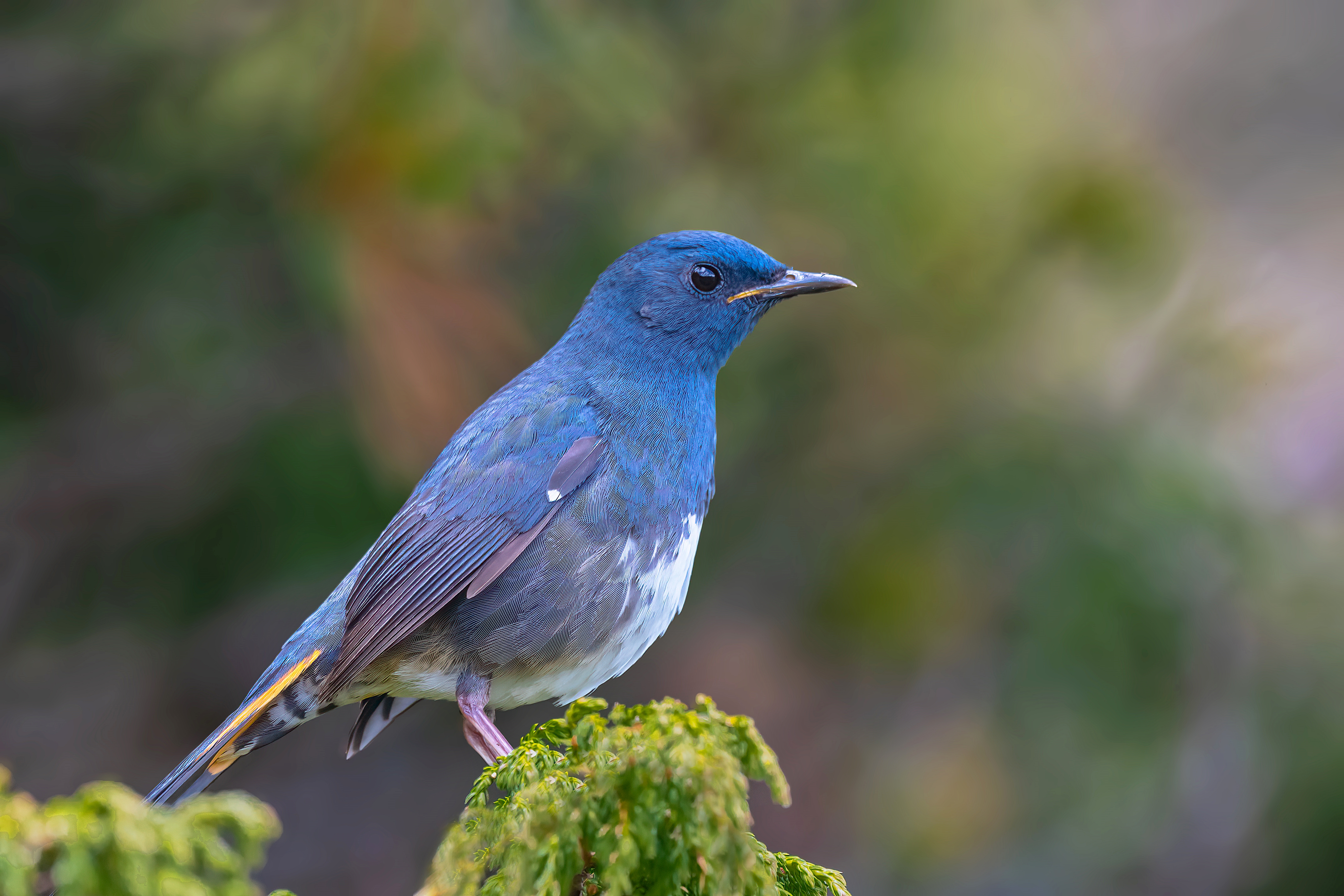
- Male in Sinthan Top, Kashmir

Conservation status
- Least Concern (IUCN 3.1)

Scientific classification
- Kingdom: Animalia
- Phylum: Chordata
- Class: Aves
- Order: Passeriformes
- Family: Muscicapidae
- Genus: Luscinia
- Species: L. phaenicuroides

Binomial name
- Luscinia phaenicuroides (Gray, JE & Gray, GR, 1847)

Synonyms
- Hodgsonius phoenicuroides Hodgsonius phaenicuroides

= White-bellied redstart =

Species of bird

The white-bellied redstart (Luscinia phaenicuroides) is a species of bird of the family Muscicapidae. It is found in Bhutan, China, India, Laos, Myanmar, Nepal, Pakistan, Thailand, and Vietnam, where its natural habitat is temperate forests.

The white-bellied redstart was previously the only species in the genus Hodgsonius. A large molecular phylogenetic study published in 2010 found that the white-bellied redstart formed part of a clade that included the common nightingale. The species was therefore moved to Luscinia.

== Gallery ==
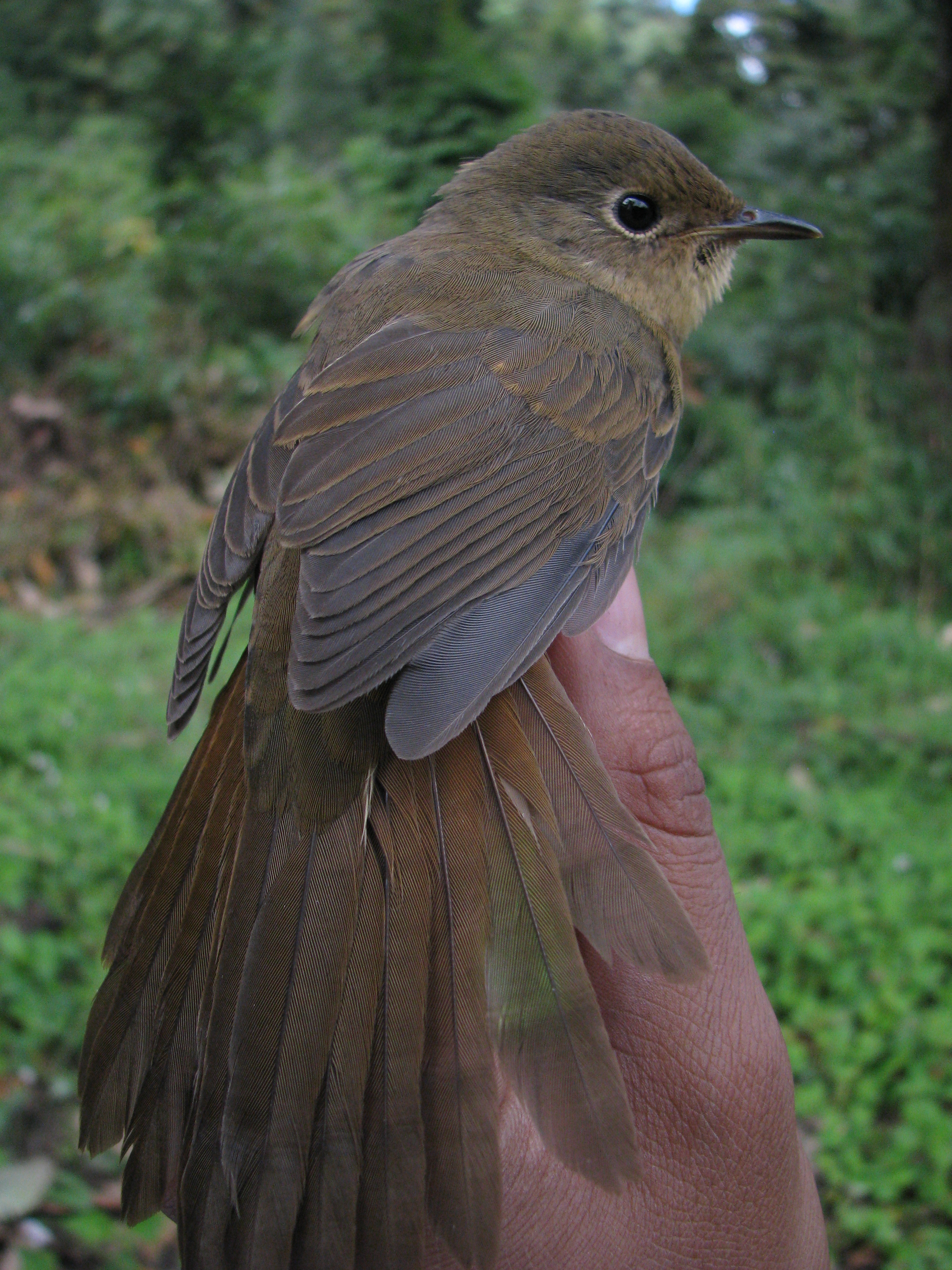
Juvenile female from Arunachal Pradesh, India

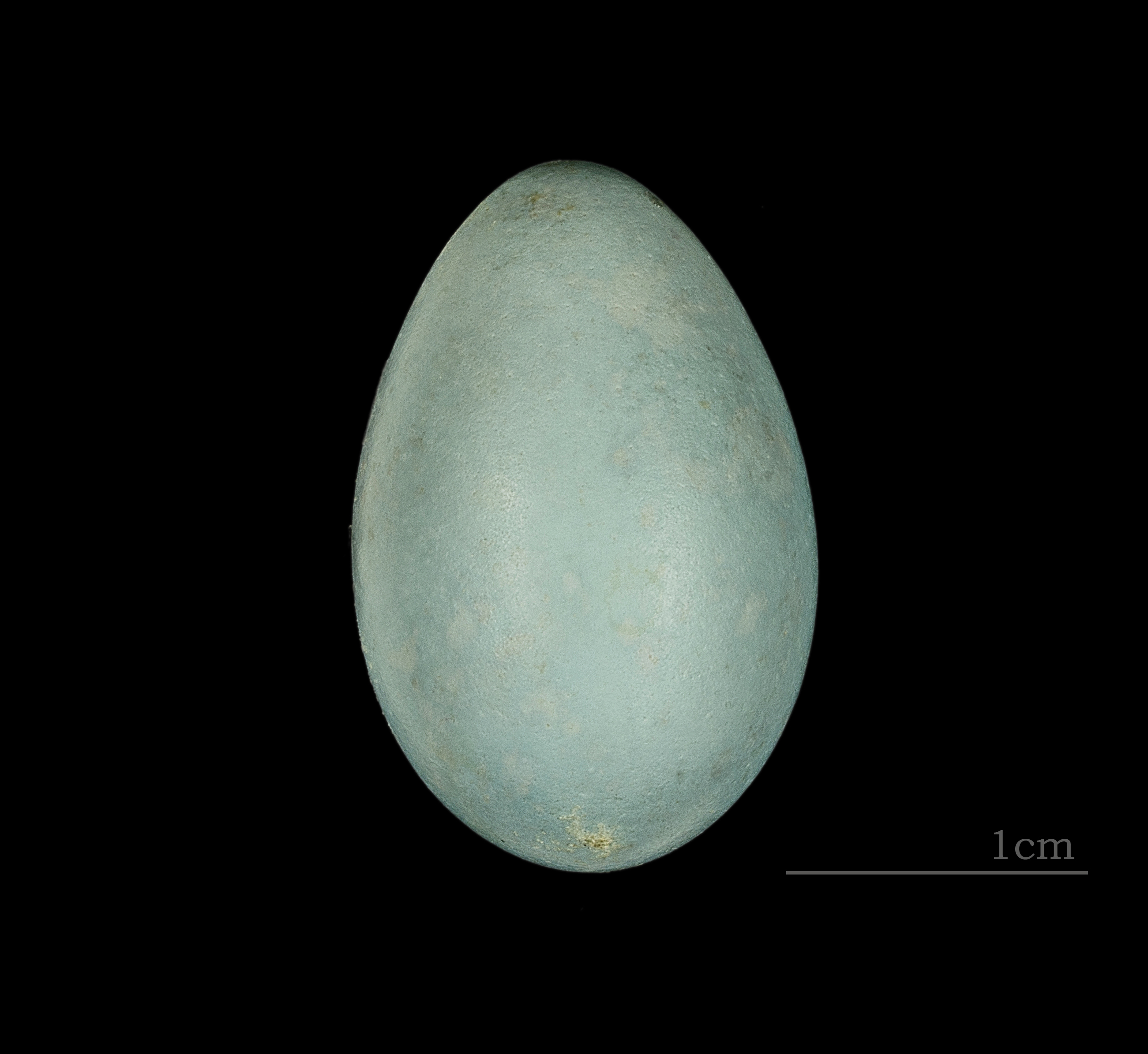
Egg (MHNT)
