= Luscinia denesi =

Luscinia denesi Temporal range: Late Miocene

Scientific classification
- Kingdom: Animalia
- Phylum: Chordata
- Class: Aves
- Order: Passeriformes
- Family: Muscicapidae
- Genus: Luscinia
- Species: †L. denesi

Binomial name
- †Luscinia denesi Kessler, 2013

Extinct species of bird

Luscinia denesi is an extinct species of Luscinia that inhabited Hungary during the Neogene period.

== Etymology ==
The specific epithet "denesi" is a tribute to Dénes Jánossy, a Hungarian paleontologist.
