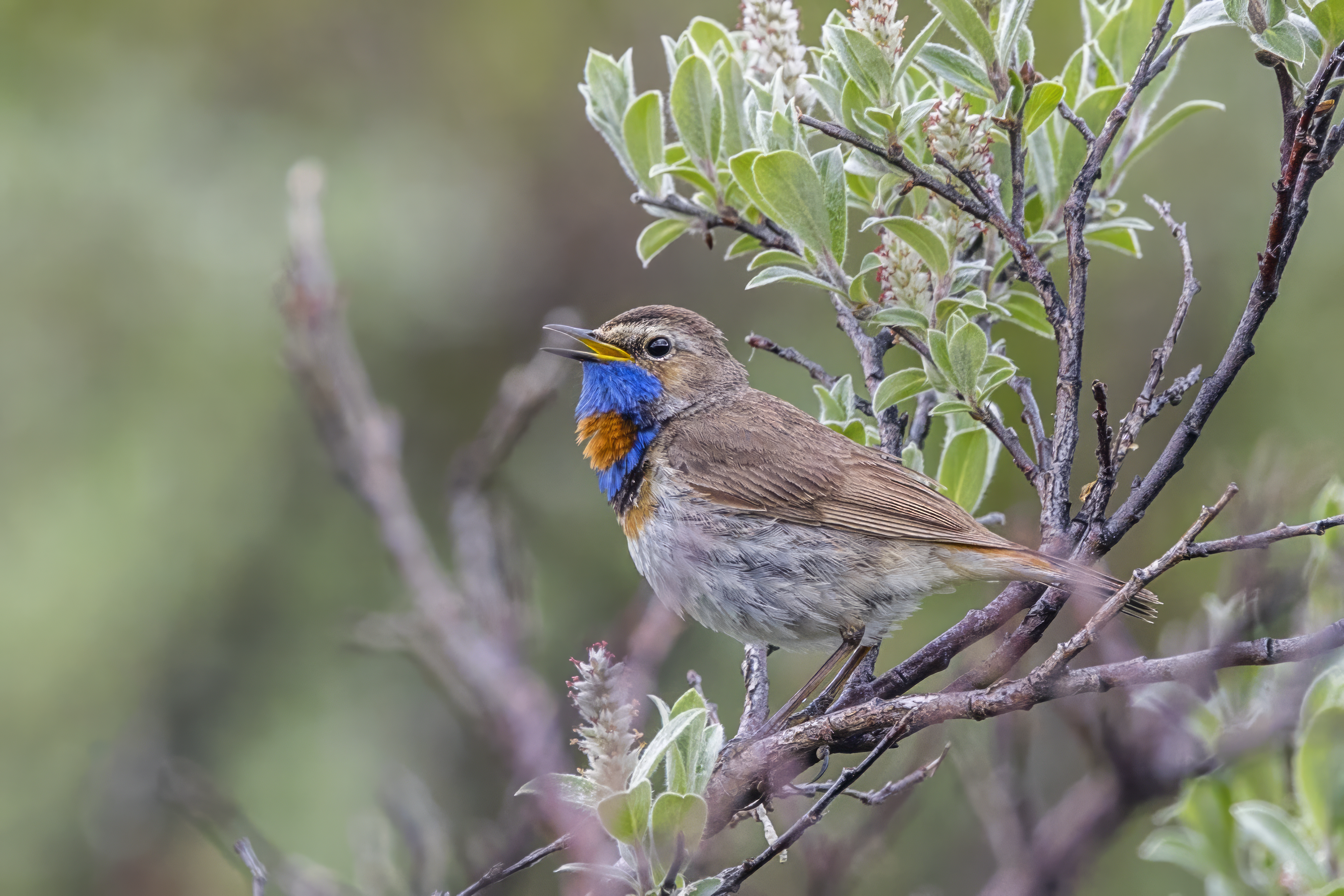
- Male L. s. svecica, Oppdal, Norway

Conservation status
- Least Concern (IUCN 3.1)

Scientific classification
- Kingdom: Animalia
- Phylum: Chordata
- Class: Aves
- Order: Passeriformes
- Family: Muscicapidae
- Genus: Luscinia
- Species: L. svecica

Binomial name
- Luscinia svecica (Linnaeus, 1758)
- Distribution of the bluethroat (orange: breeding range; blue: non-breeding range)

Synonyms
- Motacilla svecica Linnaeus, 1758; Cyanecula svecica

Audio
- Song recorded in Chukotka, Russia

= Bluethroat =

Species of bird

The bluethroat (Luscinia svecica) is a small passerine bird in the Old World flycatcher family. It is a migratory insectivorous species breeding in wet birch wood or bushy swamp in Europe and across the Palearctic with a foothold in western Alaska. It nests in tussocks or low in dense bushes. It winters in the Iberian Peninsula, the northern half of Africa, and in southern Asia (among others including the Indian subcontinent). The bluethroat, and similar small European flycatchers, are often called chats.

The bluethroat is similar in size to the European robin at 13–14 cm. It is plain brown above except for the distinctive tail, brown with black outer corners and red basal side patches. It has a strong white supercilium. The males have a striking throat pattern, with a vivid glossy blue throat bordered below with (usually) a narrow black band (but see subspecies, below), and a broad brick-red band below that; additionally there is often a central spot, either red or white, in the middle of the blue throat; see subspecies below for details. Despite the distinctive appearance of the males, recent genetic studies show only limited variation between the forms, and confirm that this is a single species. Moult begins in July after breeding and is completed in 40–45 days, before the birds migrate.

The male has a varied and very imitative song. Its call is a typical chat chack noise.

== Taxonomy ==
The bluethroat was formally described in 1758 by the Swedish naturalist Carl Linnaeus in the tenth edition of his Systema Naturae under the binomial name Motacilla svecica. Linnaeus specified the type locality as "Europae alpinis" (Alpine Europe) but this was restricted to Sweden and Lapland by German ornithologist Ernst Hartert in 1910. The specific epithet svecica is Modern Latin meaning "Swedish". The bluethroat is now one of four species placed in the genus Luscinia that was introduced in 1817 by the English naturalist Thomas Forster.

=== Subspecies ===
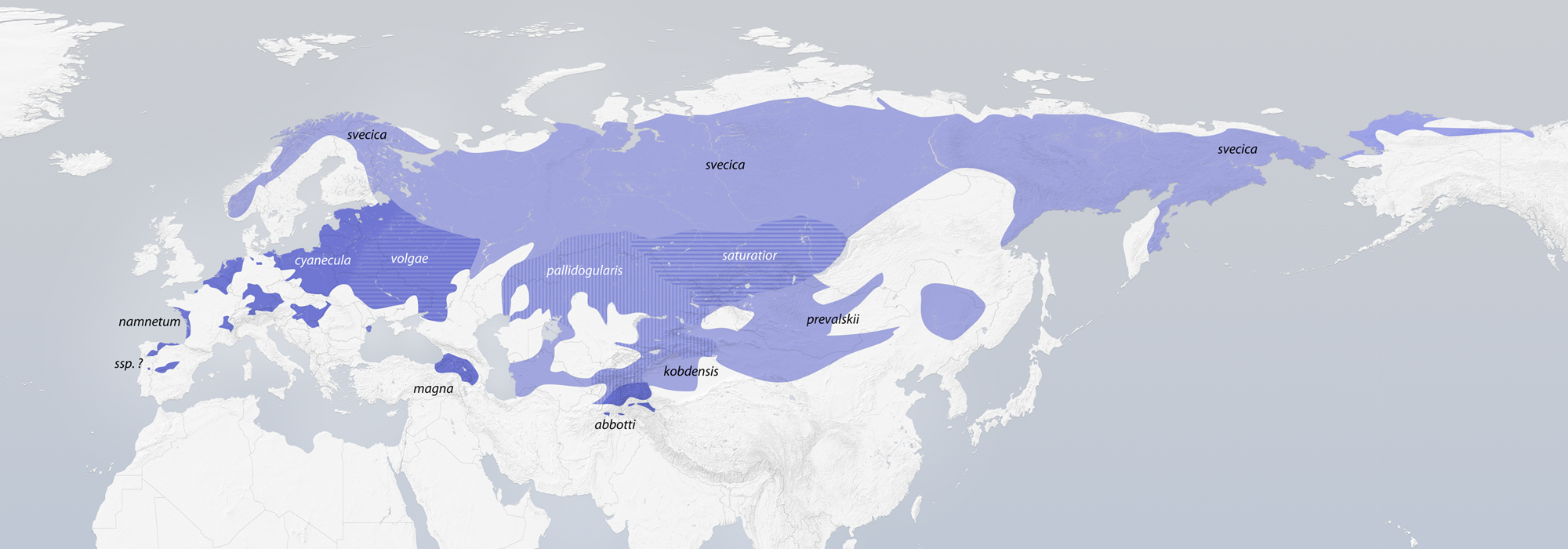
Breeding distribution of the bluethroat subspecies

Eleven subspecies are currently accepted by IOC, but only seven by Shirihai. They differ in the extent and intensity of the blue on the throat in the males, whether the blue contains a central spot or not, and if it does, the colour of the spot; they also differ significantly in their breeding habitat and ecology.

- L. s. svecica (Linnaeus, 1758) (red-spotted bluethroat) – breeds in subarctic shrub tundra from Scandinavia east to western Alaska, winters in southern Asia in India, Pakistan, Middle East. Throat blue with a red spot.
- L. s. namnetum Mayaud, 1934 – breeds in lowland reedbeds in western France, winters SW Europe and NW Africa. Small, and short-winged; plumage as L. s. cyanecula.
- L. s. cyanecula (Meisner, 1804) (white-spotted bluethroat) – breeds in lowland reedbeds in central Europe from northern and eastern France northeast to the Baltic States, and southeast to Ukraine, winters in Africa. Throat blue with a white spot.
- L. s. azuricollis (Rafinesque, 1814) – breeds northern Spain. Throat blue with no spot or only a small white spot.
- L. s. volgae (Kleinschmidt, 1907) – breeds in lowland western Russia, winters in NE Africa and the Middle East. Intermediate between L. s. svecica, L. s. pallidogularis, and L. s. cyanecula, but usually with a red spot. Treated by Shirihai as a synonym of L. s. svecica.
- L. s. magna (Zarudny & Loudon, 1904) (syn. L. s. luristanica Ripley, 1952) – breeds in mountains in eastern Turkey, the Caucasus, and northern Iran, winters in NE Africa and the Middle East. Throat blue with no spot, and no black band between the blue and the broad red band. The largest subspecies, also with a stronger bill.
- L. s. pallidogularis (Zarudny, 1897) – breeds in lowland southeastern Russia and northern Kazakhstan east to the Tien Shan, winters in southern Asia. Much as L. s. svecica but blue slightly paler, and red spot often slightly paler rufous.
- L. s. abbotti (Richmond, 1896) – breeds Afghanistan to NW Himalaya, winters NW India. Dark, blue throat with a small red (or occasionally white) spot; bill long and slender.
- L. s. saturatior (Sushkin, 1925) – breeds southern Siberia, northern Mongolia. Similar to L. s. svecica, and treated by Shirihai as a synonym of it.
- L. s. kobdensis (Tugarinov, 1929) – breeds western Mongolia, western China. Similar to L. s. pallidogularis, and treated by Shirihai as a synonym of it.
- L. s. przevalskii (Tugarinov, 1929) – breeds central China. Similar to L. s. pallidogularis, and treated by Shirihai as a synonym of it.

== Description ==
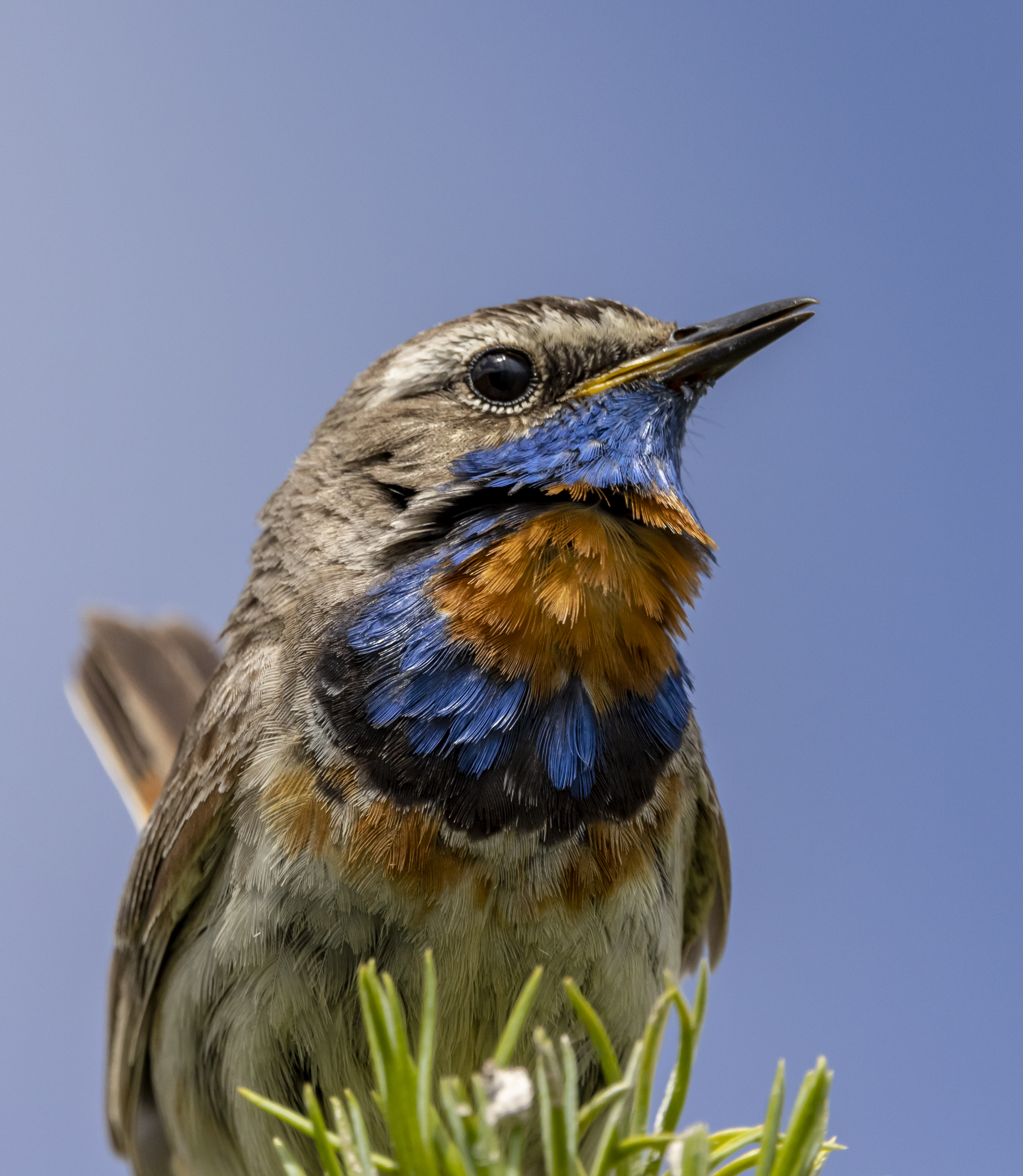
Head and neck in Katon-Karagay National Park, Kazakhstan

The male plumage is brightest in spring and summer; after the summer moult, the fresh new feathers have pale tips which obscure the throat pattern. These tips then abrade in late winter and early spring to reveal the brighter bases of the feathers. Females of all subspecies usually have just a blackish crescent and very limited blue on an otherwise cream throat and breast, though older individuals can develop more strongly male-like plumage. They are not currently known to be distinguishable to subspecies on plumage, except for individuals with the most male-like plumage (females of the small L. s. namnetum and large L. s. magna can be identified on careful measurement). Newly fledged juveniles are freckled and spotted dark brown above and below for a few weeks after fledging, then moulting to first-winter plumage, in which both sexes resemble adult females (and like them, are not identifiable to subspecies).

== Distribution and habitat ==
A disjunct population of L. s. svecica also breeds at high altitudes in the northern Carpathian Mountains in the Czechia, altitudinally and ecologically separated from L. s. cyanecula at low levels in the same area; these birds migrate to India in winter like other L. s. svecica, not to Africa as L. s. cyanecula.

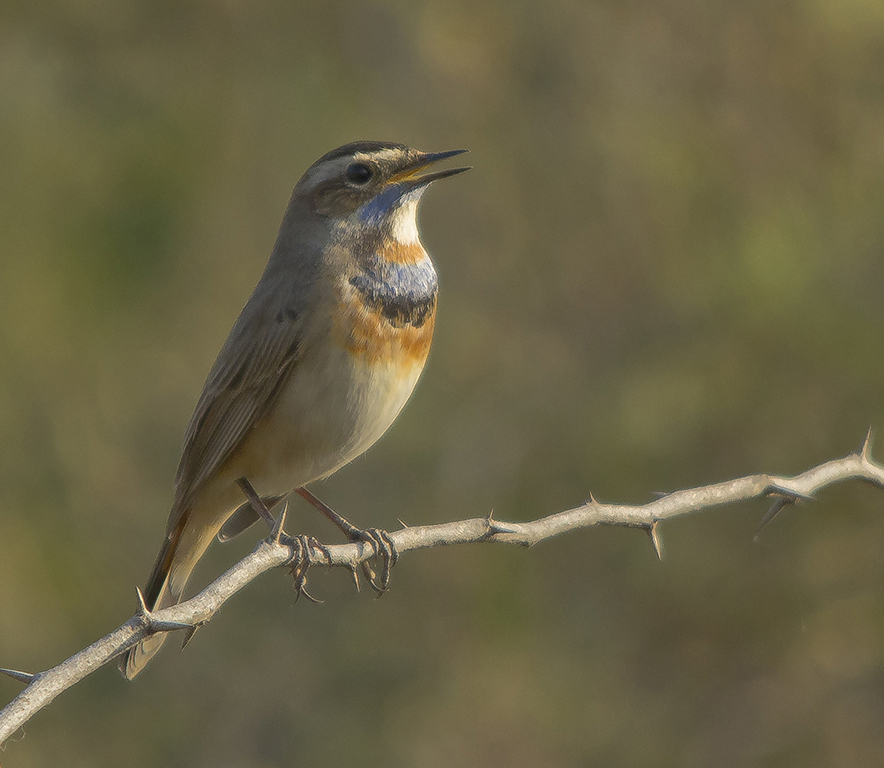
Calling

== Gallery ==
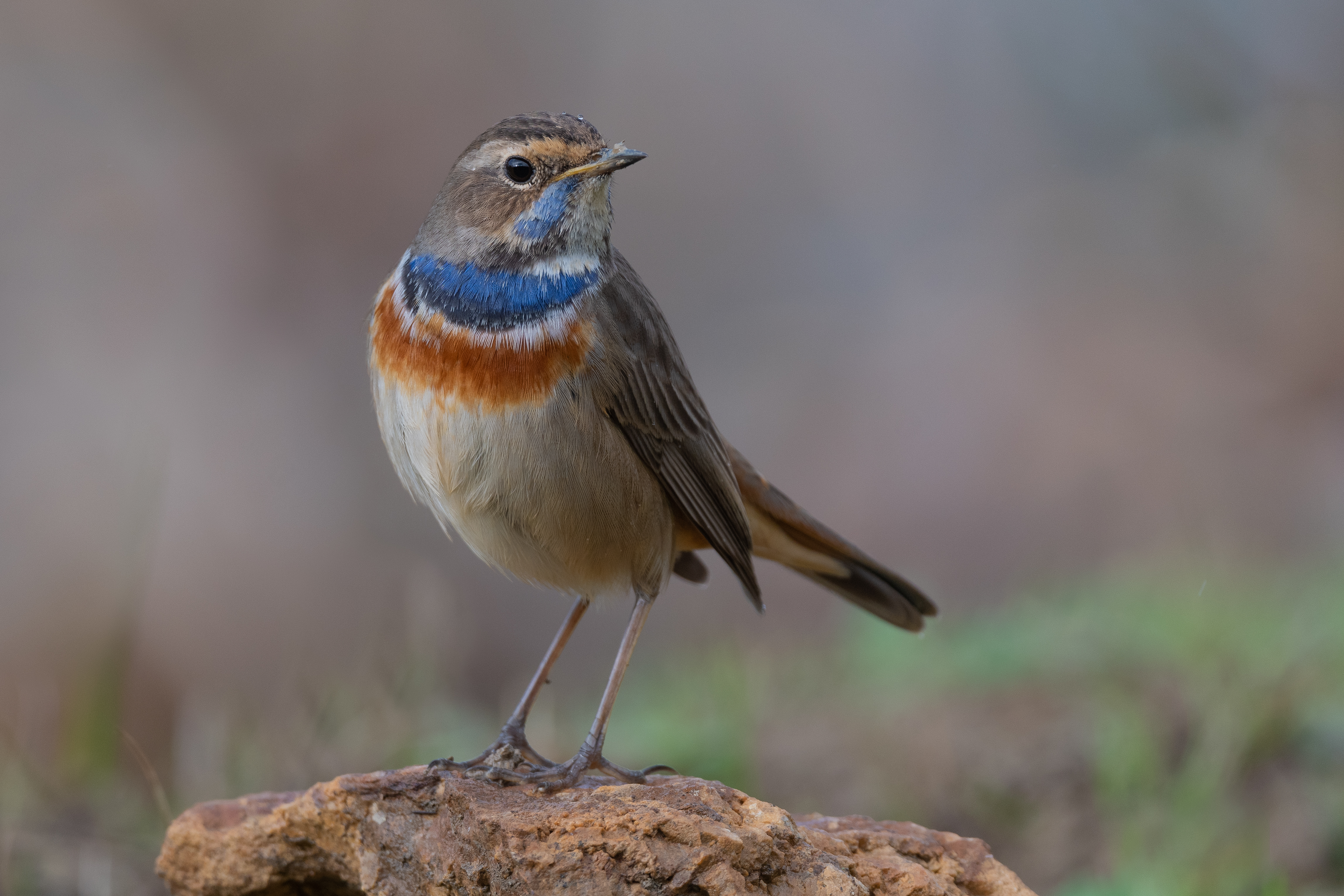
Male L. s. cyanecula wintering at Ichkeul, Tunisia

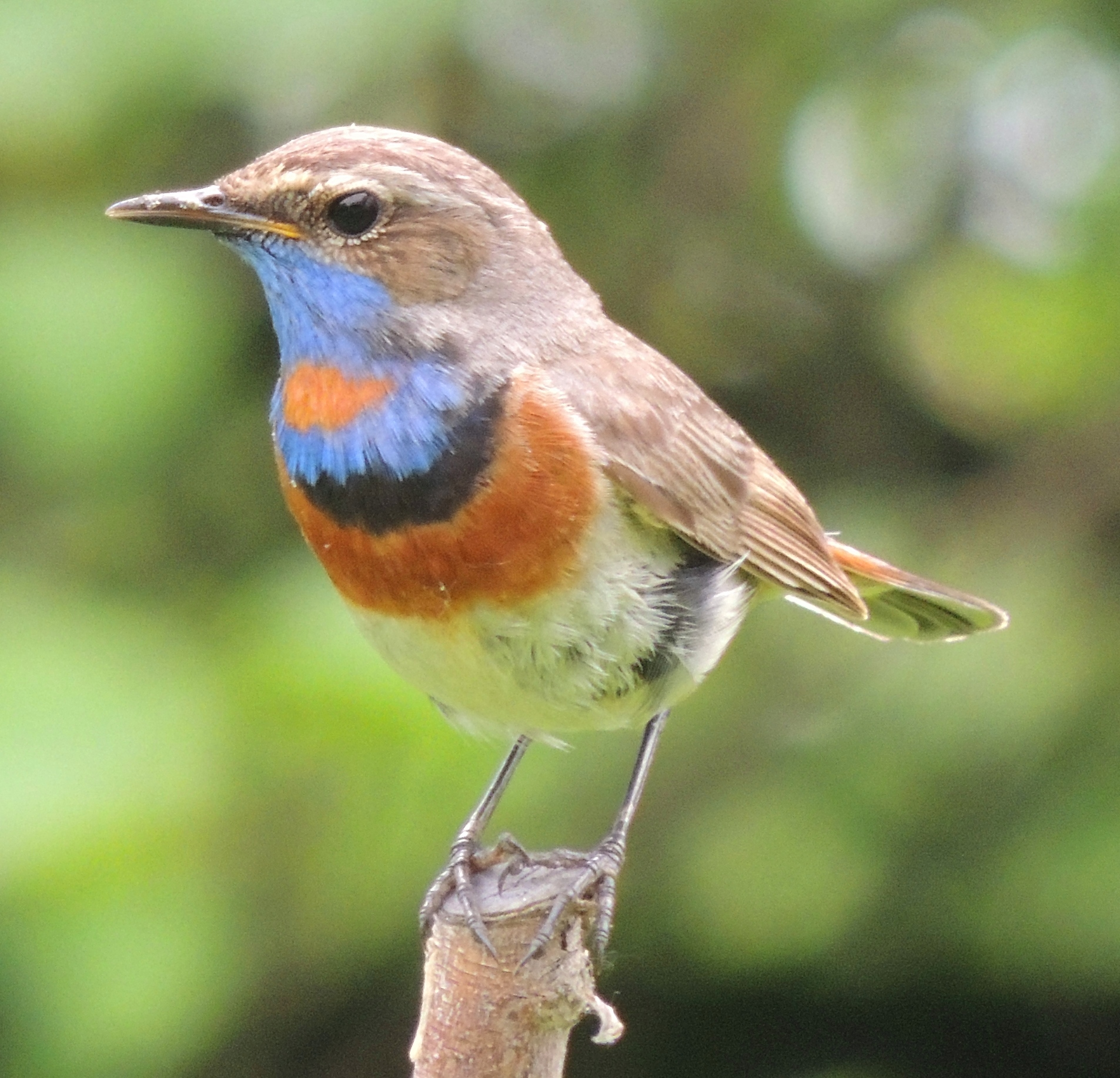
Male L. s. volgae, Elektrougli, Russia

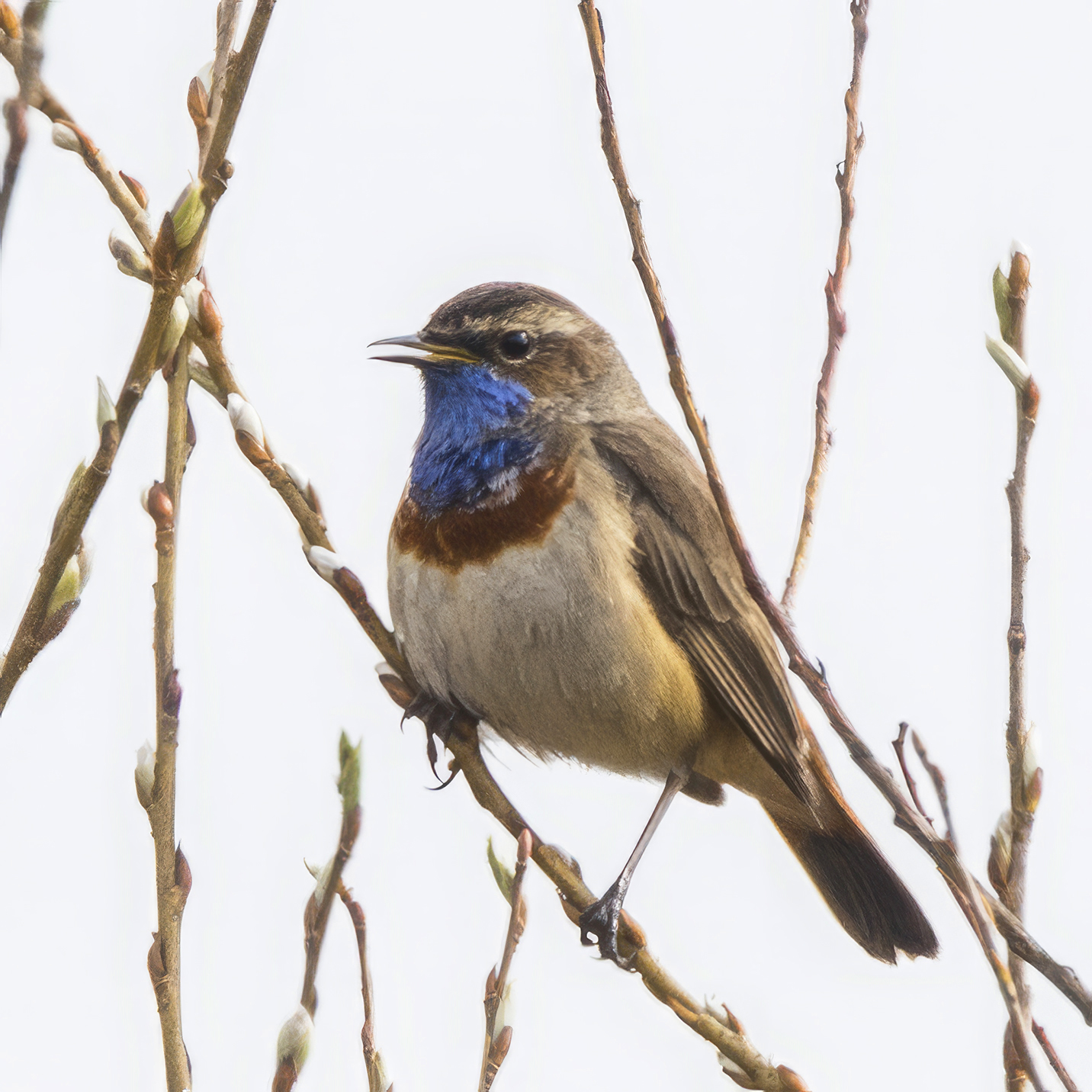
Male L. s. cyanecula, Biebrzaski, Poland

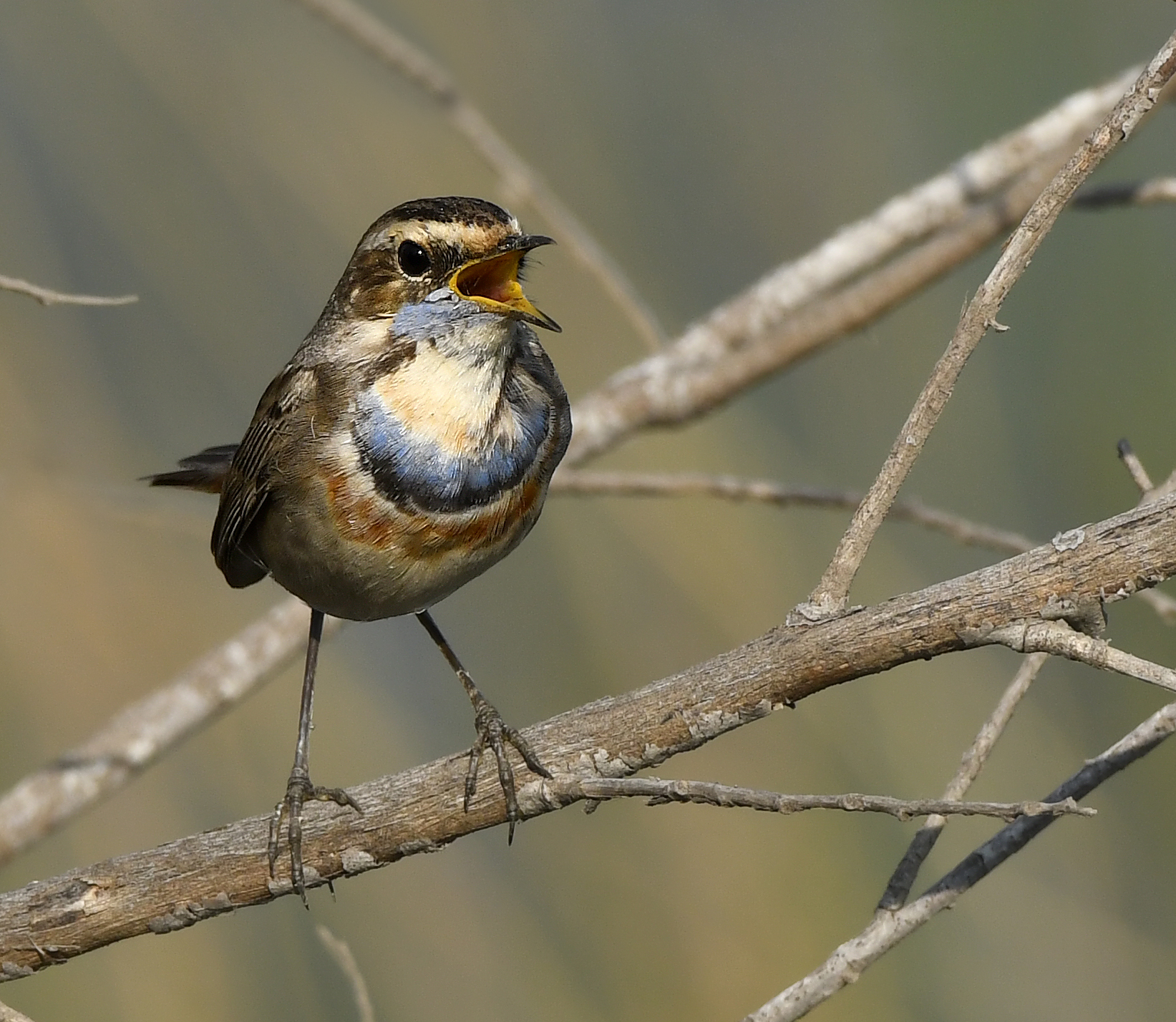
Bluethroat male calling at Jamnagar, India

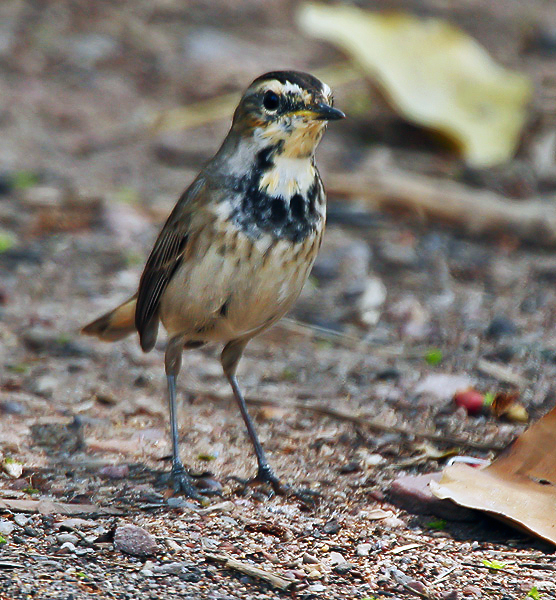
Female at Keoladeo National Park, Bharatpur, Rajasthan, India

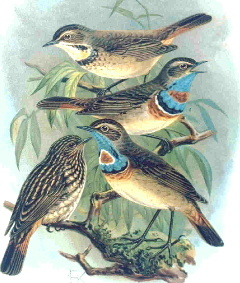
Red-spotted race

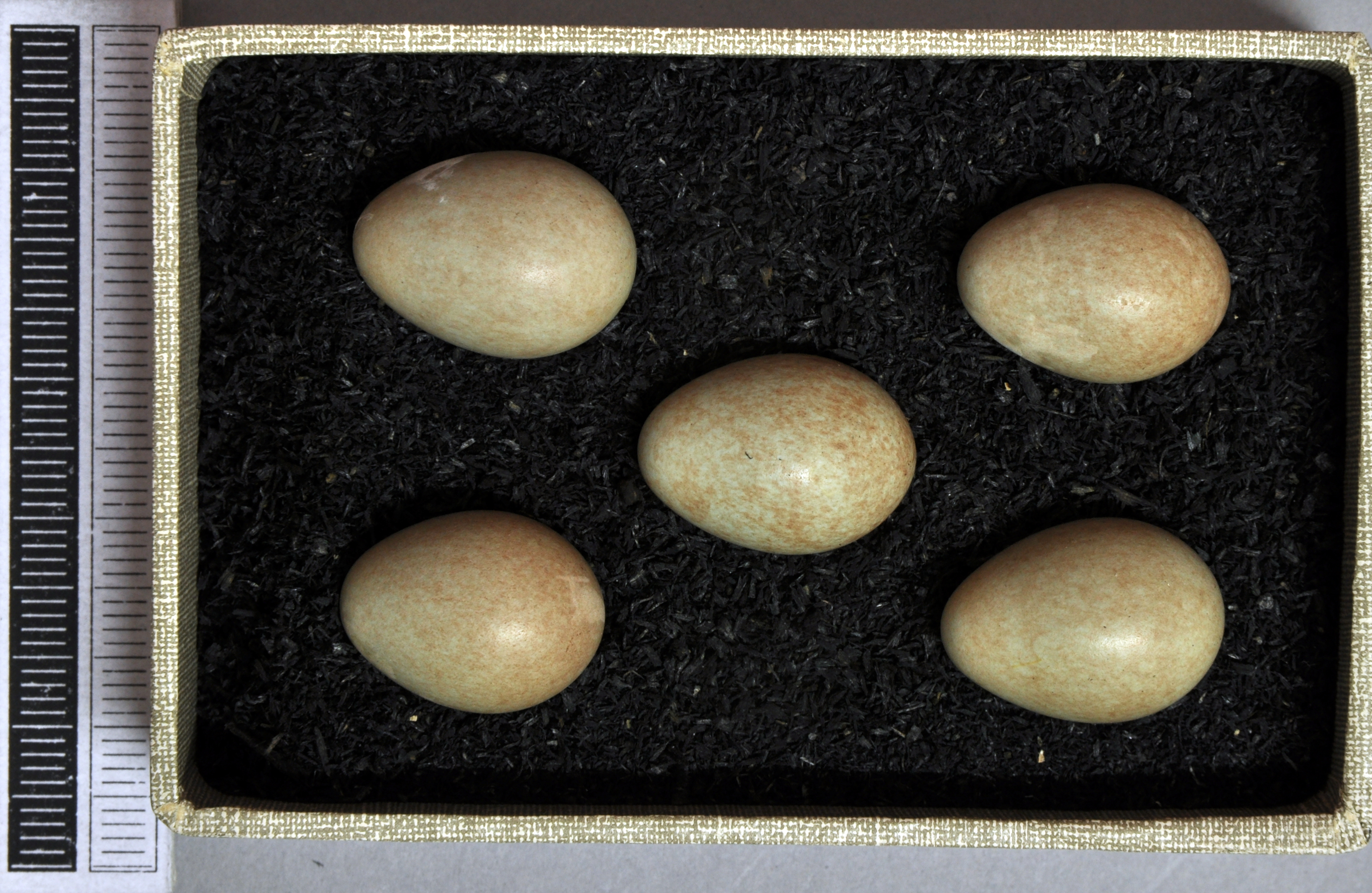
Eggs, Collection Museum Wiesbaden, Germany

Riyadh, KSA 1992
