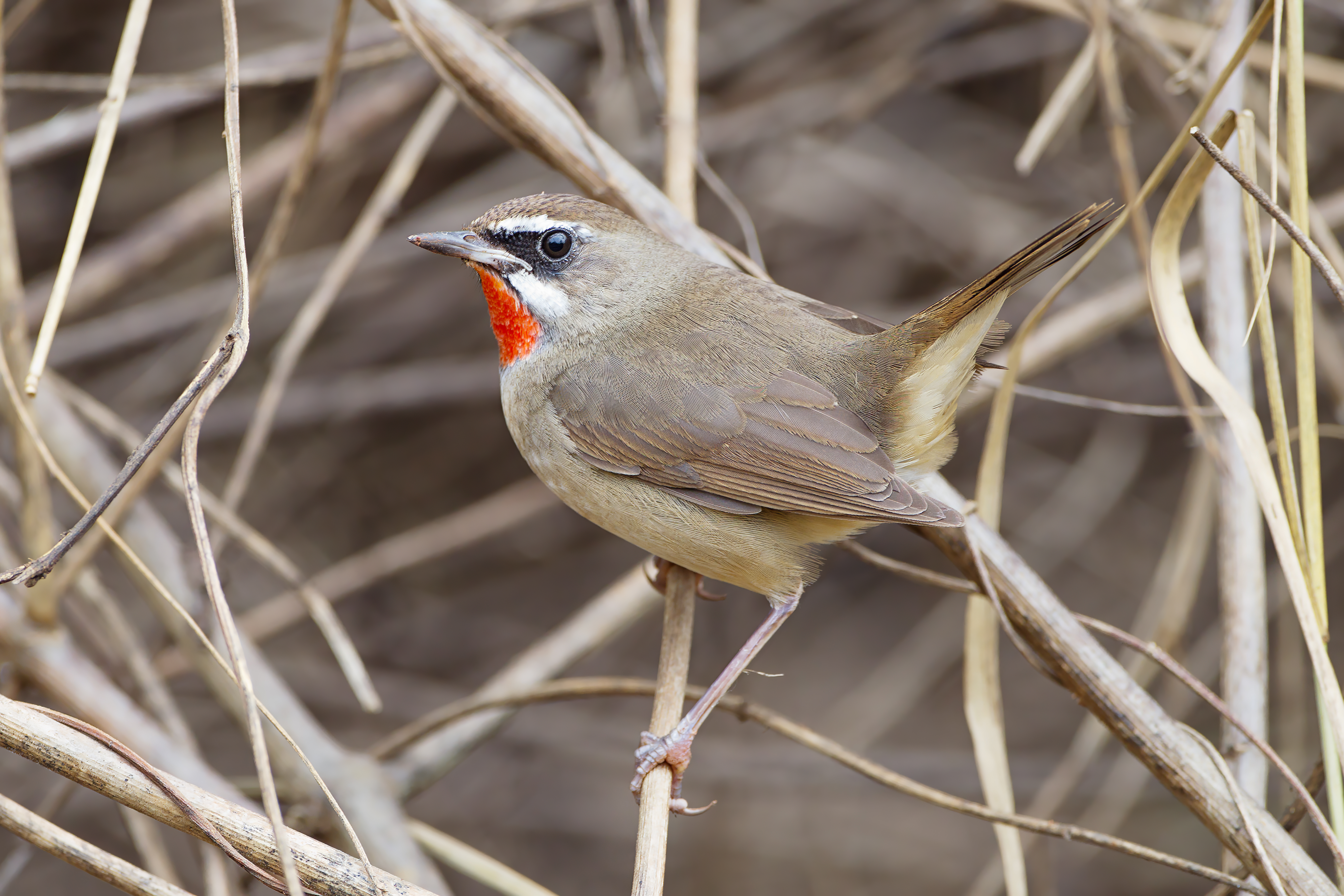
- Male
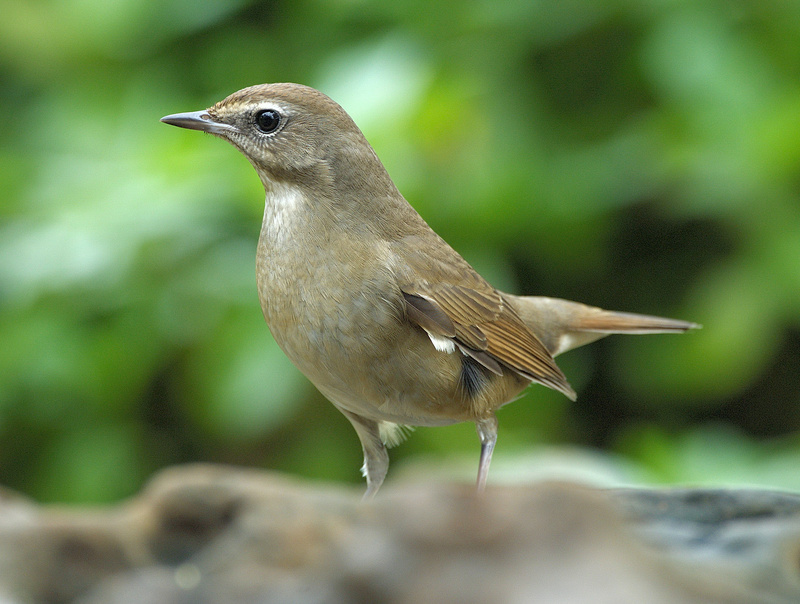
- Female

Conservation status
- Least Concern (IUCN 3.1)

Scientific classification
- Kingdom: Animalia
- Phylum: Chordata
- Class: Aves
- Order: Passeriformes
- Family: Muscicapidae
- Genus: Calliope
- Species: C. calliope

Binomial name
- Calliope calliope (Pallas, 1776)
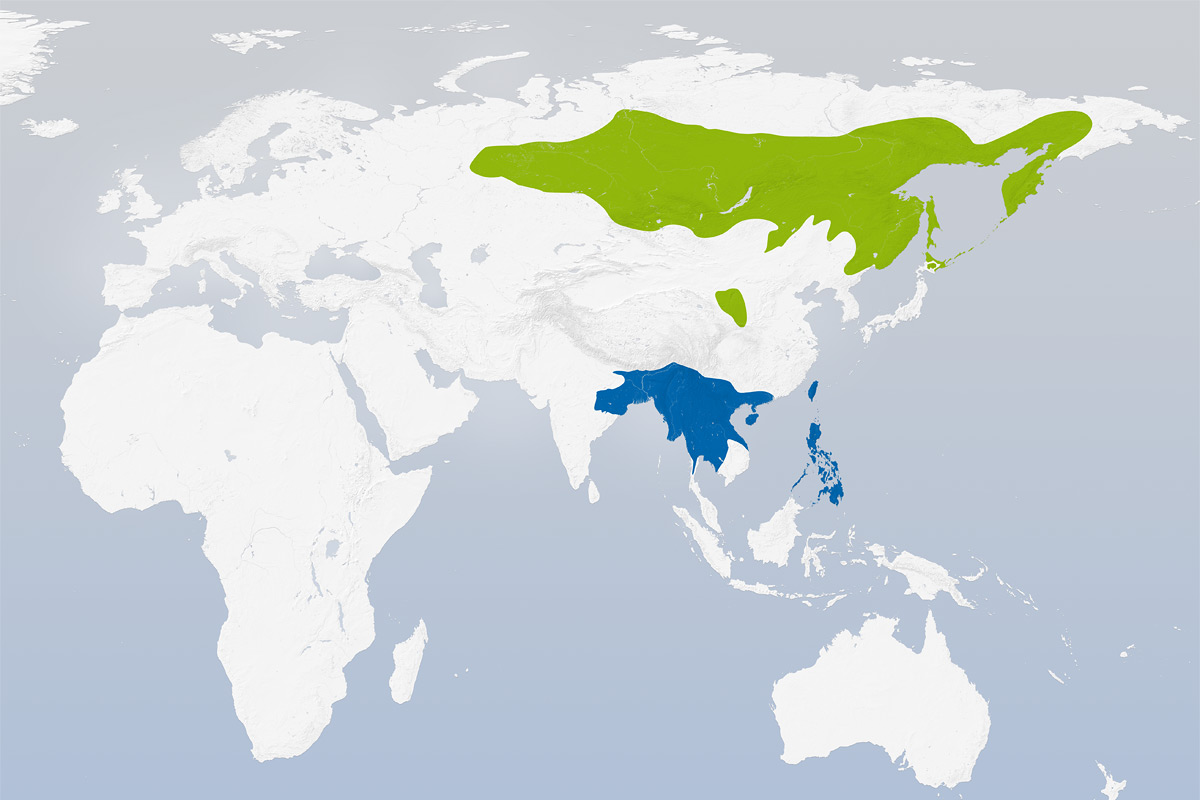
- Summer Winter

Synonyms
- Calliope lathamii Gould, 1836; Luscinia calliope

= Siberian rubythroat =

Species of bird

The Siberian rubythroat (Calliope calliope) is a small passerine bird first described by Peter Simon Pallas in 1776. It was formerly classed as a member of the thrush family, Turdidae, but is now more generally considered to be an Old World flycatcher of the family Muscicapidae. The Siberian rubythroat and similar small European species are often called chats.

== Taxonomy ==
The Siberian rubythroat was previously placed in the genus Luscinia. A large molecular phylogenetic study published in 2010 found that Luscinia was not monophyletic. The genus was therefore split and several species including the Siberian rubythroat as the type species were moved to the reinstated genus Calliope, which had originally been proposed by John Gould for the species in 1836. Calliope, from classical Greek meaning "beautiful-voiced", was one of the muses in Greek mythology and presided over eloquence and heroic poetry.

== Description ==
This species is slightly larger than the European robin. It is plain brown above except for the distinctive black tail with red side patches. It has a strong white supercilium. The male has a red throat edged with a narrow black and then a broad white border. Females lack the brightly coloured throat and borders. The male has a song similar to a harder version of the garden warbler.

== Ecology ==
The Siberian rubythroat is a migratory insectivorous species breeding in mixed coniferous forests with undergrowth in Siberia. It nests near the ground. It winters in Thailand, India, Indonesia and Bangladesh. It is an extremely rare vagrant to Western Europe, having occurred on a very few occasions as far west as Britain. It is also an extremely rare vagrant to the Aleutian Islands, most notably on Attu Island.

== Gallery ==
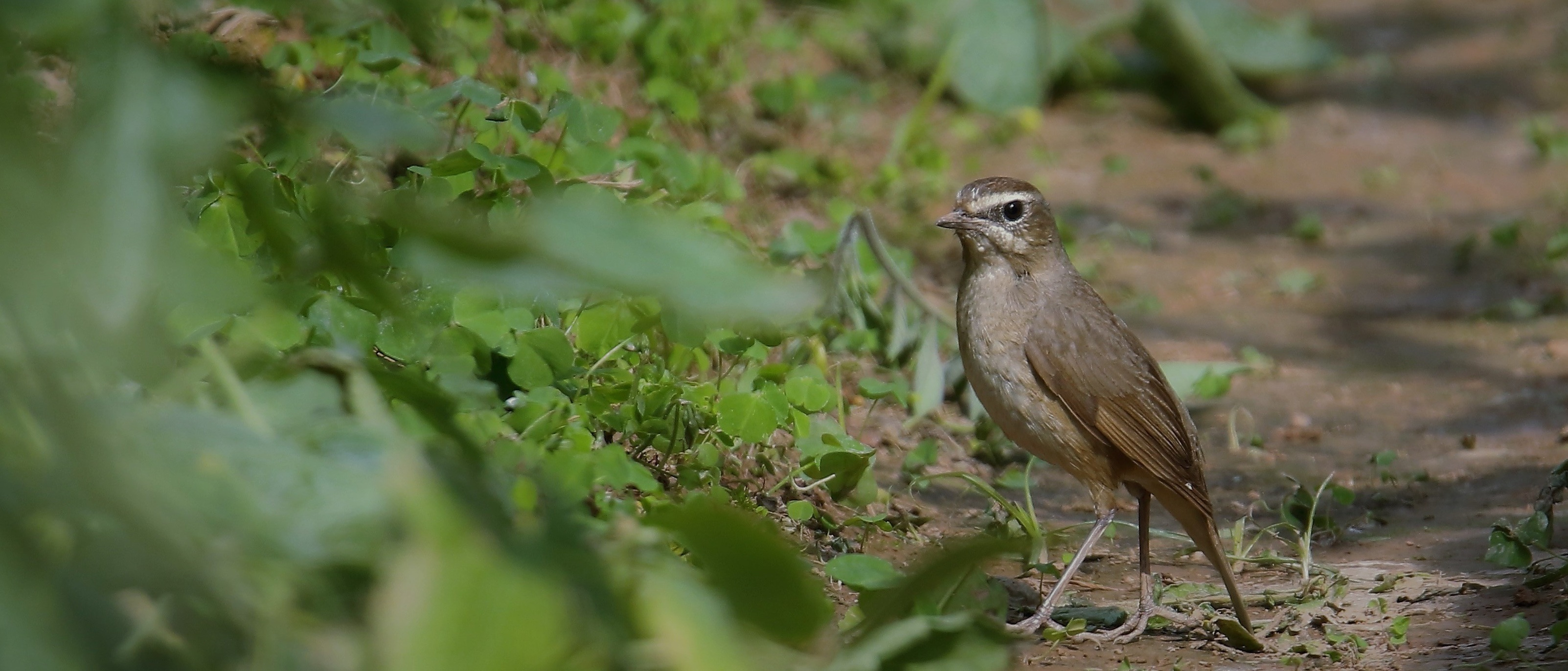
Female

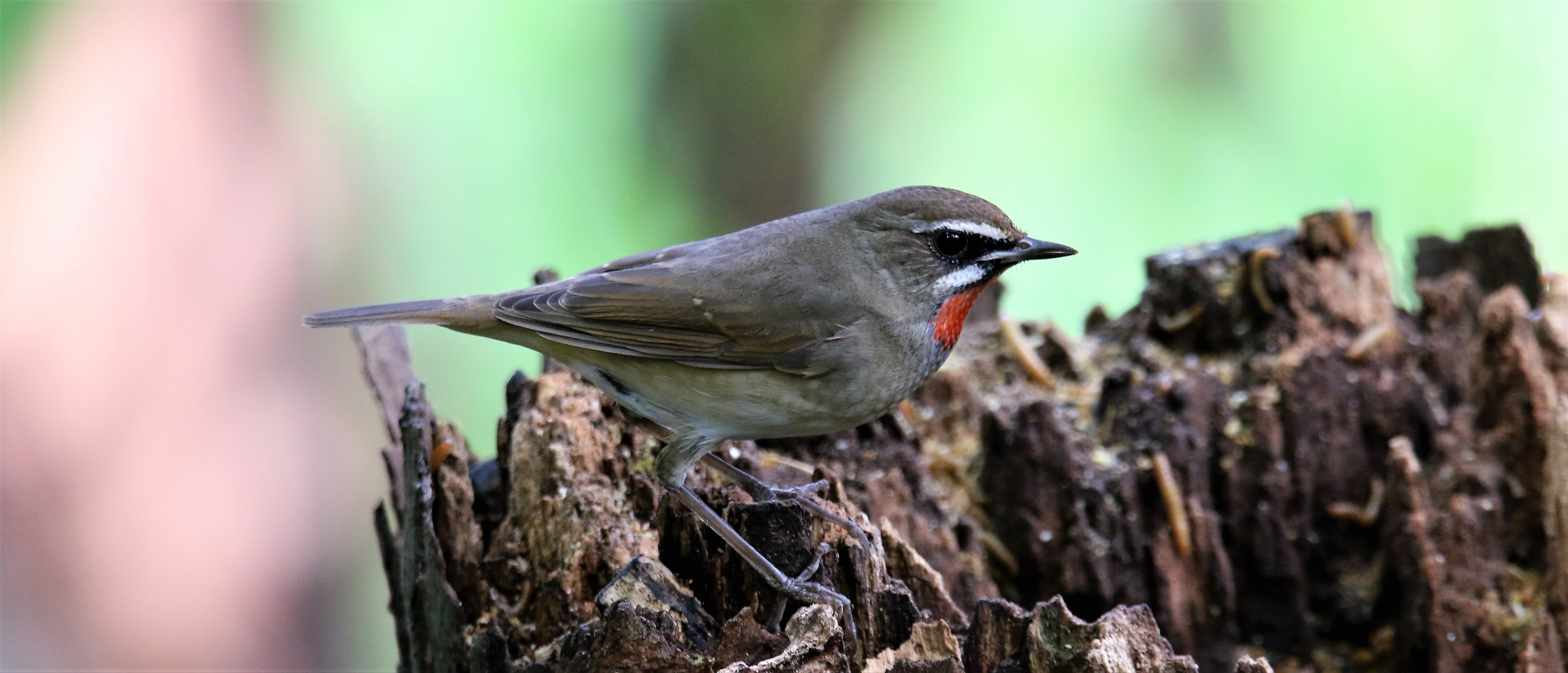
Male
