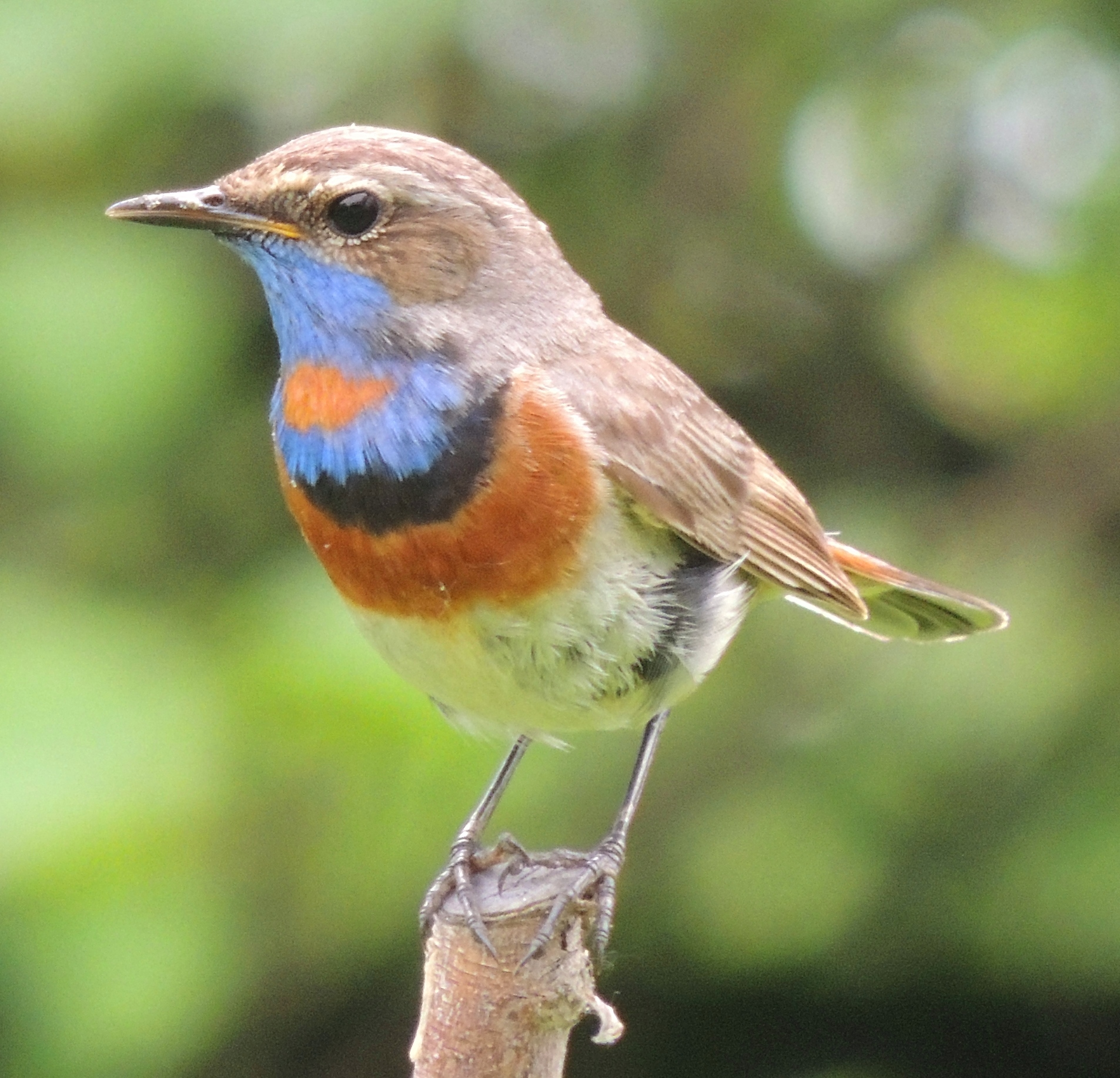
- Adult male bluethroat (Luscinia svecica)

Scientific classification
- Kingdom: Animalia
- Phylum: Chordata
- Class: Aves
- Order: Passeriformes
- Family: Muscicapidae
- Genus: Luscinia; T. Forster, 1817

Type species
- Luscinia aedon T. Forster, 1817

Species
- Several, see text

Synonyms
- Aedon Forster, 1817; Cyanosylvia Brehm, 1828; Aedonis Morris, 1837; Hodgsonius Bonaparte, 1850

= Luscinia =

Genus of birds

Luscinia is a genus of smallish passerine birds, containing the nightingales and relatives. Formerly classed as members of the thrush family Turdidae, they are now considered to be Old World flycatchers (Muscicapidae) of the chat subfamily (Saxicolinae). The chats are a lineage of Old World flycatchers that has evolved convergently to thrushes.

== Taxonomy and systematics ==
The word Luscinia was used for nightingales and similar birds in Classical Latin (e.g. in the AD 70s Naturalis Historia by Pliny the Elder), if not earlier. Etymologically, it might be derived from luscus (Latin for "half-blind", "half-understood" etc.) or clueō (Latin for "to be well-known") + (probably) Latin canō "to sing". Hence, it could be translated as "little-seen [as in the twilight] songster" or "famous songster". The genus Luscinia was introduced by the English naturalist Thomas Forster in 1817. The type species is the common nightingale (Luscinia megarhynchos).

Delimitation of Luscinia versus the genus Erithacus had been confused for long; species were rather indiscriminately placed in one or the other genus, or Luscinia was entirely merged into Erithacus. The genus Luscinia previously included many more species. A large molecular phylogenetic study published in 2010 found that the genus did not represent a monophyletic group. Species were therefore reassigned to other genera leaving only three species remaining in the original genus. The same study showed that the white-bellied redstart, previously placed in the monotypic Hodgsonius, belonged to the same clade.

The species currently placed in Luscinia are:

- Bluethroat, Luscinia svecica
- White-bellied redstart, Luscinia phaenicuroides (previously the only species in the genus Hodgsonius)
- Thrush nightingale, Luscinia luscinia
- Common nightingale or rufous nightingale, Luscinia megarhynchos

== Description ==
Thrush nightingale, Luscinia luscinia

Common nightingale (Luscinia megarhynchos) song

The Luscinia species are stocky small birds, 13–16 cm long with an upright stance and a moderately short frequently cocked tail. They watch for insects, worms and other invertebrates from a low perch, and feed mostly on the ground, hopping, with frequent stops, on their strong legs. They are territorial during the breeding season, and most occur as far north as to be migratory.

In the two species named as nightingales, the sexes are similar. They are plain brown above, whitish below with light streaking, and have a rufous tail. In the other Luscinia species, the male is much brighter than the cryptic, usually brownish-grey female. Males have a dark blue, black or brown back, and red, orange or blue on the throat and upper breast. Several have white or rufous patches on the sides of the tail, giving a pattern recalling that of the closely related wheatear (Oenanthe), or some of the less closely related Muscicapinae (e.g. red-breasted flycatcher, Ficedula parva). The songs of this genus are often complex and musical, especially in the "typical" nightingales.

They are birds of Eurasia, occurring from the subarctic to the tropical regions. They are plentiful in temperate regions, and many of the birds in this genus are strongly migratory, wintering in tropical Africa, India or Southeast Asia.

The breeding habitat is typically scrub or forest, and their cup nest is usually constructed low in a bush. The birds can be difficult to see in dense undergrowth, especially if not singing, but they may frequent somewhat more open habitats in their winter quarters.

== Fossil record ==
Fossil remains of a probable Luscinia resembling to the larger members of the genus have been found at Polgárdi in Hungary. They date from the Messinian age, around 12 to 7.3 million years ago (Ma) during the Late Miocene subepoch. A Late Pliocene fossil from Rębielice Królewskie (Poland), of Piacenzian age (around 3 Ma), could be an ancestral bluethroat. A supposed Sylvia warbler fossil from the late Gelasian of Bad Deutsch-Altenburg (Austria), about 2 Ma old, may be of a Luscinia instead; due to its recent age it probably belongs to a living species or its immediate ancestor.

- †Luscinia denesi (Late Miocene of Polgardi, Hungary)
- †Luscinia pliocaenica (Pliocene of Beremend, Hungary)

== Sources ==
- Glare, P. G. W. (ed.) (1968–1982): Oxford Latin Dictionary (1st ed.). Oxford University Press, Oxford. ISBN 0-19-864224-5
- Grimmett, Richard; Inskipp, Carol, Inskipp, Tim & Byers, Clive (1999): Birds of India, Pakistan, Nepal, Bangladesh, Bhutan, Sri Lanka, and the Maldives. Princeton University Press, Princeton, N.J. ISBN 0-691-04910-6
- Hír, János; Kókay, József; Venczel, Márton; Gál, Erika; Kessler, Eugén (2001). "Elõzetes beszámoló a felsõtárkányi "Güdör-kert" n. õslénytani lelõhelykomplex újravizsgálatáról" [A preliminary report on the revised investigation of the paleontological locality-complex "Güdör-kert" at Felsõtárkány, Northern Hungary]. Folia Historico Naturalia Musei Matraensis. 25: 41–64. Archived from the original on 2007-12-11. [Hungarian with English abstract].
- Jønsson, Knud A.; Fjeldså, Jon (2006). "A phylogenetic supertree of oscine passerine birds (Aves: Passeri)". Zoologica Scripta. 35 (2): 149–186. doi:10.1111/j.1463-6409.2006.00221.x. S2CID 85317440.
- Lewis, Charlton T. & Short, Charles (eds.) (1879): A Latin Dictionary (1st ed.). Oxford University Press, Oxford.
- Mlíkovský, Jirí (2002): Cenozoic Birds of the World (Part 1: Europe). Ninox Press, Prague. ISBN 80-901105-3-8 PDF fulltext
- Seki, Shin-Ichi (2006). "The origin of the East Asian Erithacus robin, Erithacus komadori, inferred from cytochrome b sequence data". Molecular Phylogenetics and Evolution. 39 (3): 899–905. Bibcode:2006MolPE..39..899S. doi:10.1016/j.ympev.2006.01.028. PMID 16529957.
- Svensson, Lars; Zetterström, Dan; Mullarney, Killian & Grant, Peter J. (1999): Collins Bird Guide. Harper & Collins, London. ISBN 0-00-219728-6
