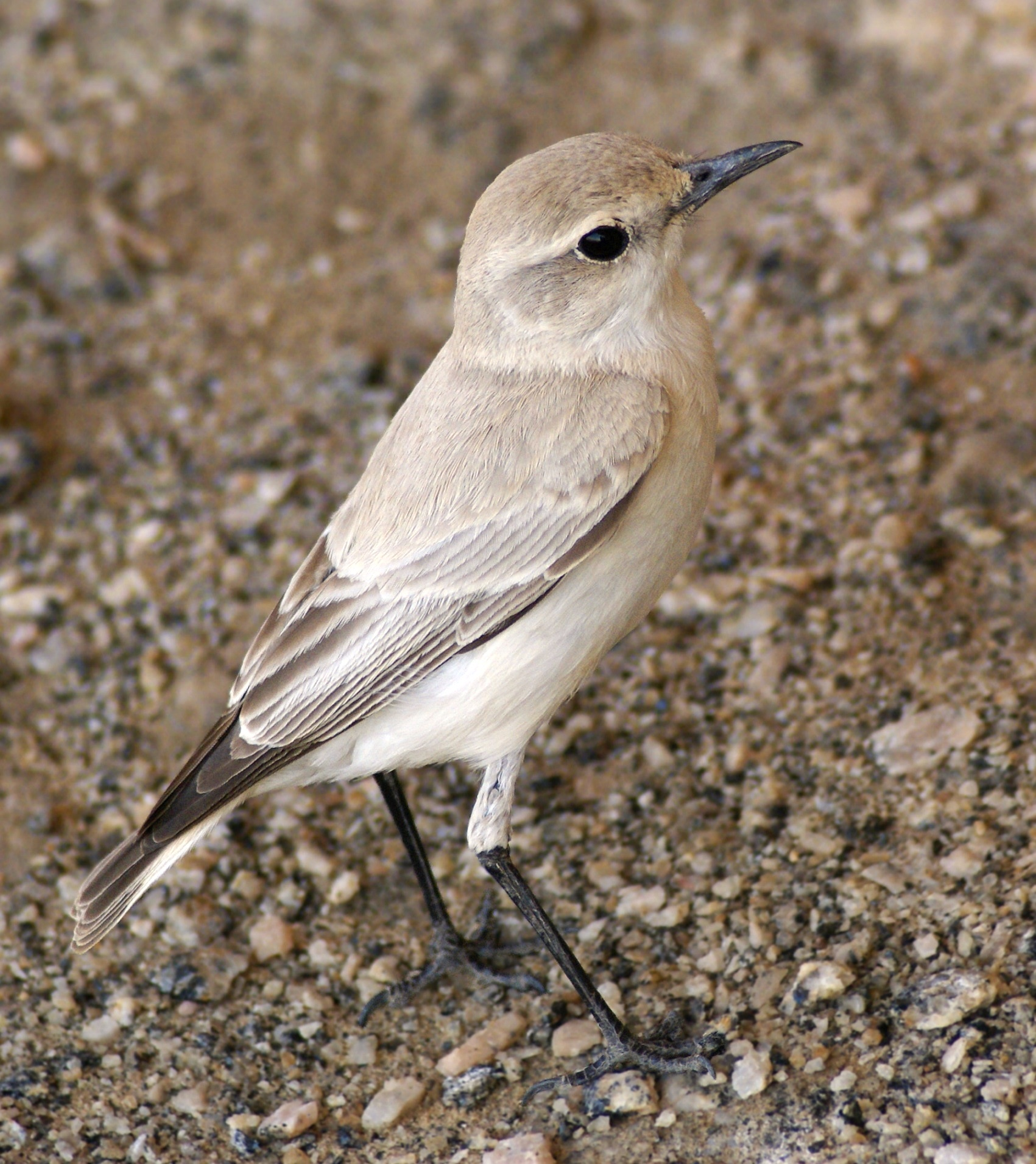
- Emarginata tractrac albicans in the Namib-Naukluft National Park of Namibia

Conservation status
- Least Concern (IUCN 3.1)

Scientific classification
- Kingdom: Animalia
- Phylum: Chordata
- Class: Aves
- Order: Passeriformes
- Family: Muscicapidae
- Genus: Emarginata
- Species: E. tractrac

Binomial name
- Emarginata tractrac (Wilkes, 1817)

Synonyms
- Cercomela tractrac

= Tractrac chat =

Species of bird

The tractrac chat (Emarginata tractrac) is a small passerine bird of the Old World flycatcher family Muscicapidae. It is a common resident breeder in southernmost Angola, western Namibia and western South Africa.

Its habitat is Karoo and desert scrub, hummock dunes and gravel plains.

== Taxonomy ==
The tractrac chat was illustrated and described by the French naturalist François Levaillant in Volume 4 of his Histoire naturelle des oiseaux d'Afrique published in 1805. He named the bird, "Le tractrac", an onomatopoeia based on its call. The first formal description of the tractrac chat was by the English publisher John Wilkes in 1817 under the binomial name Motacilla tractrac. The species was subsequently placed in the genus Cercomela introduced by Charles Lucien Bonaparte in 1856. It was moved to its current genus, Emarginata, after molecular phylogenetic studies published in 2010 and 2012 found that Cercomela was polyphyletic.

There are 5 subspecies:

- E. t. hoeschi (Niethammer, 1955) – southwestern Angola and northwestern Namibia
- E. t. albicans (Wahlberg, 1855) – western Namibia
- E. t. barlowi (Roberts, 1937) – southern Namibia
- E. t. nebulosa (Clancey, 1962) – southwestern Namibia
- E. t. tractrac (Wilkes, 1817) – western South Africa

== Description ==
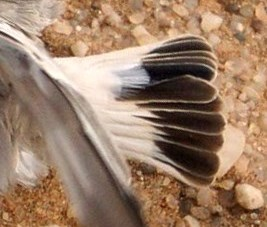
The bicoloured tail pattern is a reliable field mark in any of the subspecies

The tractrac chat is 14–15 cm long with a weight of 20 g. Its tail is white with a dark inverted "T" at the tip, reminiscent of the pattern shown by several wheatears. The short straight bill and the legs and feet are black. It has a dark eye. The Namib form found on hummock dunes and at the coast has almost white plumage with grey wings and grey tail marking. The south-eastern form, found in gravel plains has brown upperparts with blackish flight feathers and tail markings. Its underparts are white. The sexes are similar, but the juvenile is more mottled than the adult.

This species is smaller than the Karoo chat which also has the white of the outer tail feathers extending to the tip. It is paler and greyer than familiar and sickle-winged chats, both of which have a darker rump.

The tractrac chat has a soft fast "tactac" song and a loud chattering territorial defence call.

== Behaviour ==
The tractrac chat builds a cup-shaped nest of straw and leaves on the ground, usually under a bush or shrub. It lays two to three red eggs. This species is monogamous, mating for life.

It is usually seen singly or in pairs. It forages from the ground for insects including butterflies, bees, wasps, locusts and ants. Prey is typically taken in a short sally from a perch.

== Conservation status ==
This common species has a large range, with an estimated extent of 1,000,000 km². The population size is believed to be large, and the species is not believed to approach the thresholds for the population decline criterion of the IUCN Red List (i.e. declining more than 30% in ten years or three generations). For these reasons, the species is evaluated as Least Concern.
