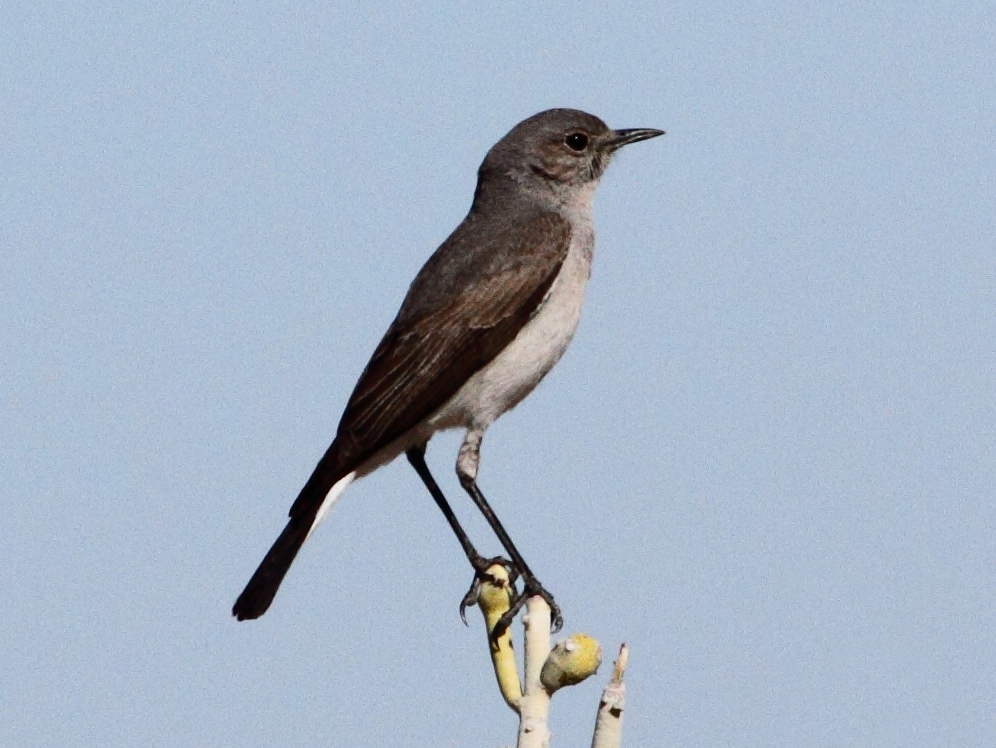
- In Northern Cape, South Africa

Conservation status
- Least Concern (IUCN 3.1)

Scientific classification
- Kingdom: Animalia
- Phylum: Chordata
- Class: Aves
- Order: Passeriformes
- Family: Muscicapidae
- Genus: Emarginata
- Species: E. schlegelii

Binomial name
- Emarginata schlegelii (Wahlberg, 1855)

Synonyms
- Cercomela schlegelii

= Karoo chat =

Species of bird

The Karoo chat (Emarginata schlegelii) is a small passerine bird of the Old World flycatcher family Muscicapidae. It is a common resident breeder in southwesternmost Angola, western Namibia and western South Africa. Its habitat is Karoo and desert scrub in the south, extending to the escarpment zone in the north.

== Taxonomy ==
The first formal description of the Karoo chat was by the Swedish naturalist Johan August Wahlberg in 1855 under the binomial name Erithacus schlegelii. The species was subsequently placed in the genus Cercomela introduced by Charles Lucien Bonaparte in 1856. It was moved to its current genus, Emarginata, after molecular phylogenetic studies published in 2010 and 2012 found that Cercomela was polyphyletic. The specific name commemorates the German ornithologist, Hermann Schlegel.

There are four subspecies:

- E. s. benguellensis (Sclater, WL, 1928) – southwestern Angola and northwestern Namibia
- E. s. schlegelii (Wahlberg, 1855) – coastal Namibia
- E. s. namaquensis (Sclater, WL, 1928) – southern Namibia and northwestern South Africa
- E. s. pollux (Hartlaub, 1866) – western and central South Africa

== Description ==
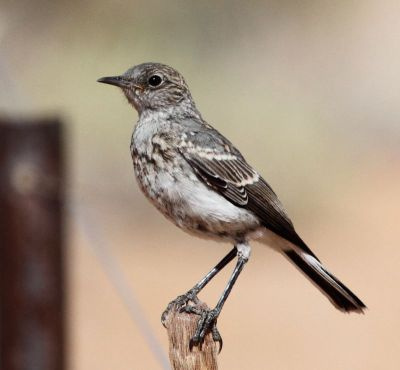
Juvenile in Northern Cape, South Africa

The Karoo chat is 16–18 cm long and weighs around 32 gm. Its upperparts are grey, but it has a rufous patch behind the eye, and the tail is black with white outer feathers. Its underparts are white, the short straight bill, legs and feet are black and the eye is dark. The sexes are similar, but the juvenile is spotted with buff and has scaly underparts.

This species is paler than the similar grey form of the female mountain wheatear, from which it also differs in having a grey (not white) rump and completely white outer tail feathers. Its larger size and all-white outer tail feathers prevent confusion with the tractrac or sickle-winged chats.

The Karoo chat has chak-chak and trrat-trrat calls.

== Behaviour ==
The Karoo chat builds a cup-shaped nest of straw and leaves on the ground, usually under a bush or shrub. It lays two to four green eggs. This species is monogamous, mating for life.

The Karoo chat is usually seen singly or in pairs. It forages from the ground for insects including butterflies, bees, wasps, locusts and ants. Prey is typically taking in a short flight.

== Conservation status ==
This common species has a large range, with an estimated extent of 1,100,000 km². The population size is believed to be large, and the species is not believed to approach the thresholds for the population decline criterion of the IUCN Red List (i.e. declining more than 30% in ten years or three generations). For these reasons, the species is evaluated as Least Concern.
