= John Pass =

John Pass may refer to:

- John Pass (poet), Canadian poet
- John Pass (engraver), English engraver

== See also ==
- John Paas (1789–1832), English murder victim.
