= Paas =

Paas may refer to:

== People with the surname ==
- David Paas (born 1971), Belgian football player
- John Paas, also spelled John Pass (engraver)
- René Paas (born 1966), Dutch politician

== Places ==
- Paas, Java (nl), village in Pameungpeuk, Indonesia

== Other ==
- Paas (dye), brand of Easter egg dye
- Payments as a service
- Platform as a service, cloud computing service
