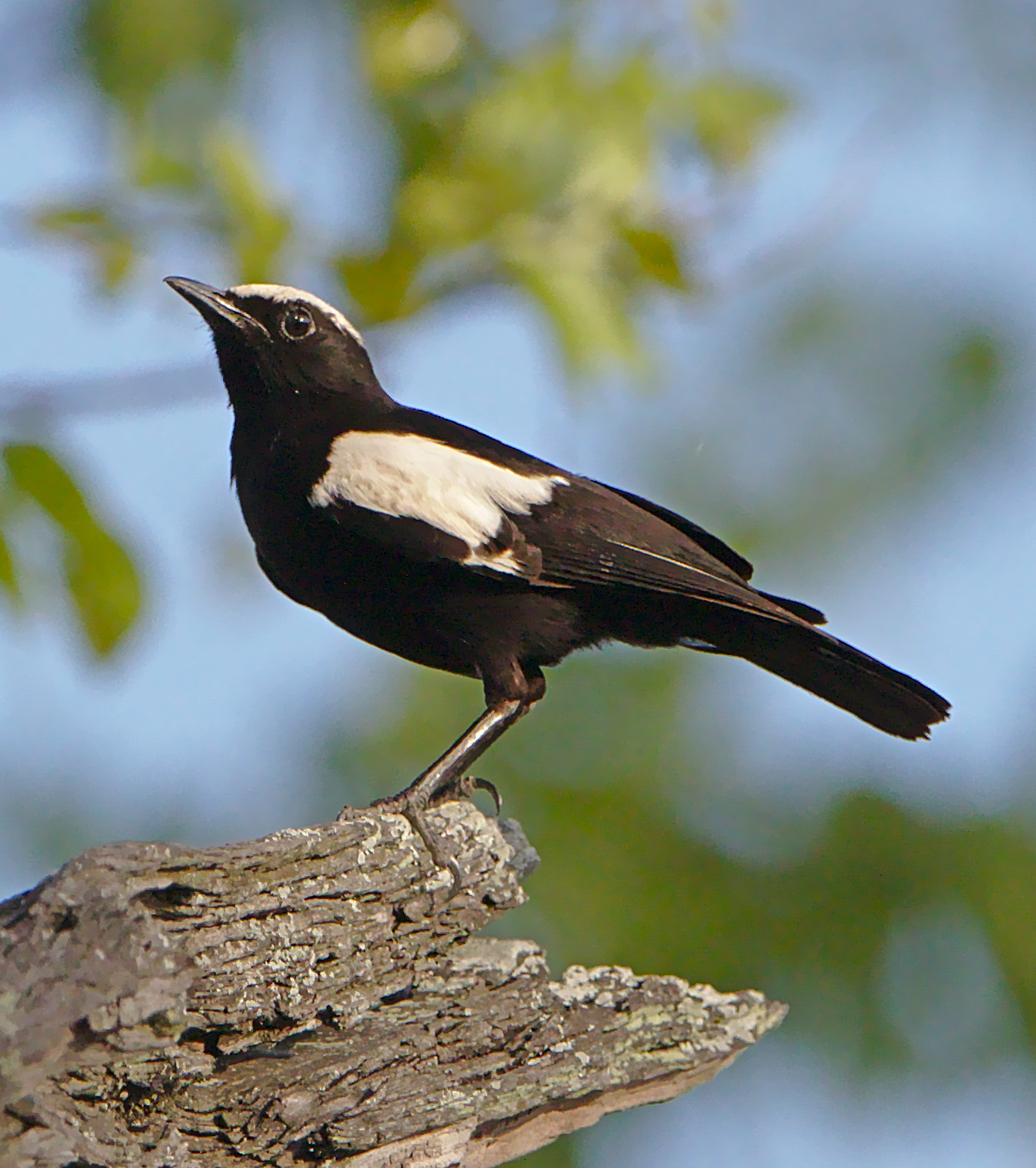
- Male at Hwange National Park, Zimbabwe

Conservation status
- Least Concern (IUCN 3.1)

Scientific classification
- Kingdom: Animalia
- Phylum: Chordata
- Class: Aves
- Order: Passeriformes
- Family: Muscicapidae
- Genus: Myrmecocichla
- Species: M. arnotti

Binomial name
- Myrmecocichla arnotti (Tristram, 1869)
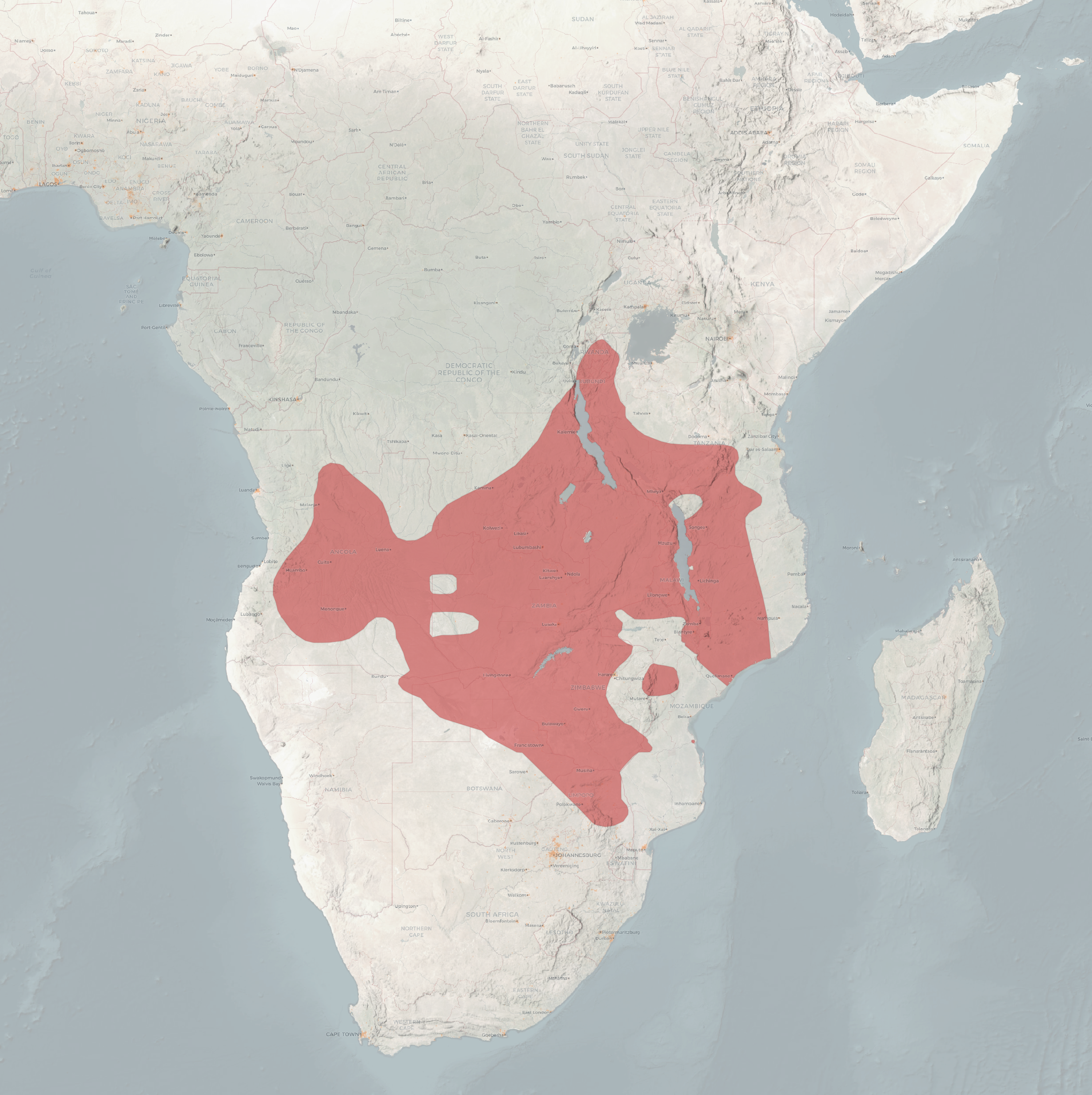
- Distribution of the Arnot's Chat

Synonyms
- Myrmecocichla arnoti; Pentholaea arnotti

= Arnot's chat =

Species of bird

Arnot's chat (Myrmecocichla arnotti), also known as the white-headed black-chat, is a species of bird in the chat and flycatcher family Muscicapidae. The species is found in southern Africa from Rwanda and Angola to South Africa.

== Taxonomy ==
Arnot's chat was formally described and illustrated in 1869 as Saxicola arnotti by English clergyman and ornithologist Henry Baker Tristram based upon a specimen collected at the Victoria Falls in modern-day Zimbabwe. Tristram wrote that he named the species after the collector, a Mr. Arnott, but the man was actually named David Arnot. For this reason, it was suggested in 1965 that the name should be spelled arnoti instead. However, since there is no evidence in Tristram's original paper that the name was misspelled, the rules of the International Code of Zoological Nomenclature mandate that the spelling arnotti should be maintained. Arnot's chat is now placed in the genus Myrmecocichla that was introduced in 1851 by the German ornithologist Jean Cabanis. Along with the white-fronted black chat this species is sometimes separated into the genus Pentholaea. Three subspecies are recognised:

- M. a. arnotti (Tristram, HB, 1869) – eastern Angola and southeastern Tanzania (east of the Eastern Arc Mountains) southward to northern and northeastern Botswana, northern and western Mozambique, and northeastern South Africa
- M. a. harterti Neunzig, R, 1926 – Angola
- M. a. collaris Reichenow, A, 1882 – primarily western Tanzania (west of the Eastern Arc Mountains and southern highlands), also far eastern Democratic Republic of the Congo, southern and eastern Rwanda, Burundi, and southwestern Uganda

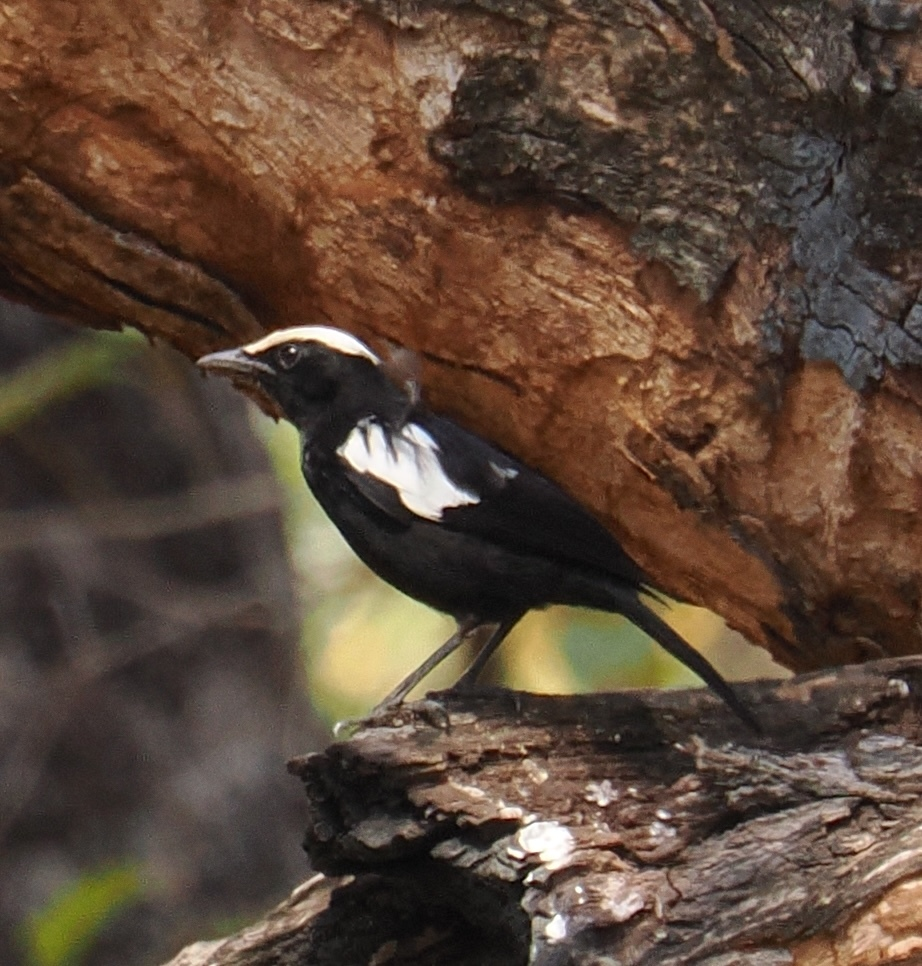
M. a. collaris (Ruaha chat)

The subspecies M. a. collaris has sometimes been considered as a separate species, the Ruaha chat, based upon mitochondrial DNA data. This subspecies is indistinguishable from the nominate in male birds but has different plumage in females.

== Distribution and habitat ==
Arnot's chat is most commonly found in healthy stands of miombo and mopane woodland. It also occurs at lower densities in other kinds of open woodland with little herbaceous cover, and very rarely near buildings. It generally occurs from sea level to 1,500 m (4,900 ft). The species is generally not migratory, but is presumed to undertake some localized wandering.

== Description ==
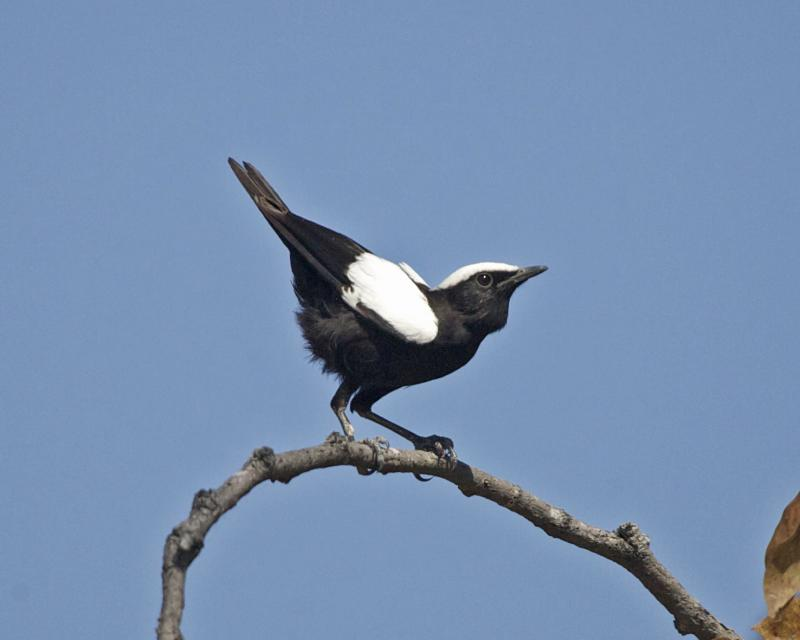
Male (nominate race)

Arnot's chat ranges in size from 16 to 18 cm (6.3–7.1 in) and weighs around 35 g (1.2 oz). The plumage of the adults is sexually dimorphic; the male of the nominate race is overall black with a white crown and a white patch on the wing coverts. The female is similar but with a black crown and a white (tipped with black) throat and neck. The bill and legs are black. Juvenile birds are like the adults but with white feather tips on the crown or throat instead of fuller white. The male of the race harterti has less extensive white on the wings and a mostly black head with a small area of white on the forehead and above the eye; the white throat of the female is also less extensive than on the nominate.
