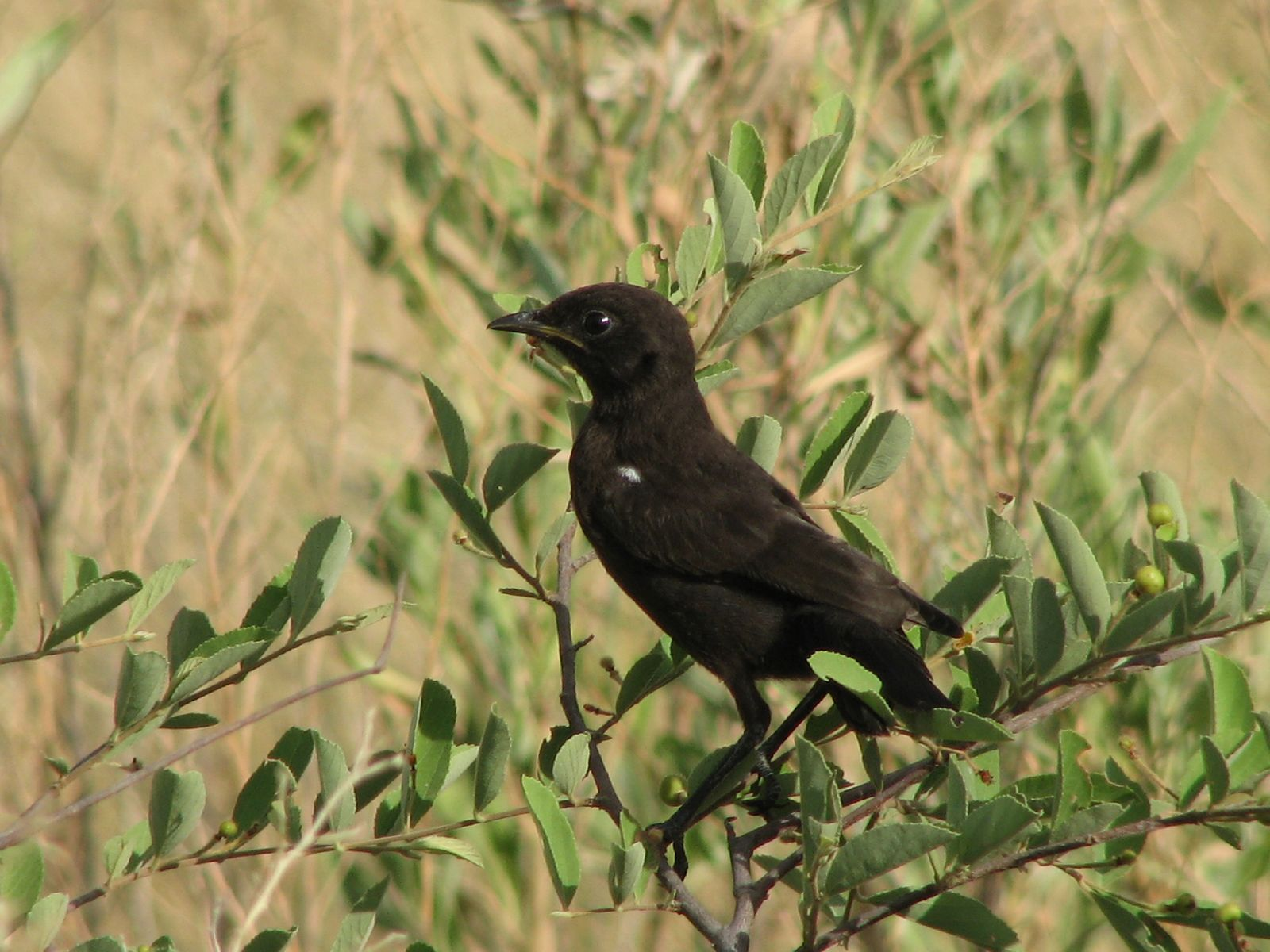
- Male
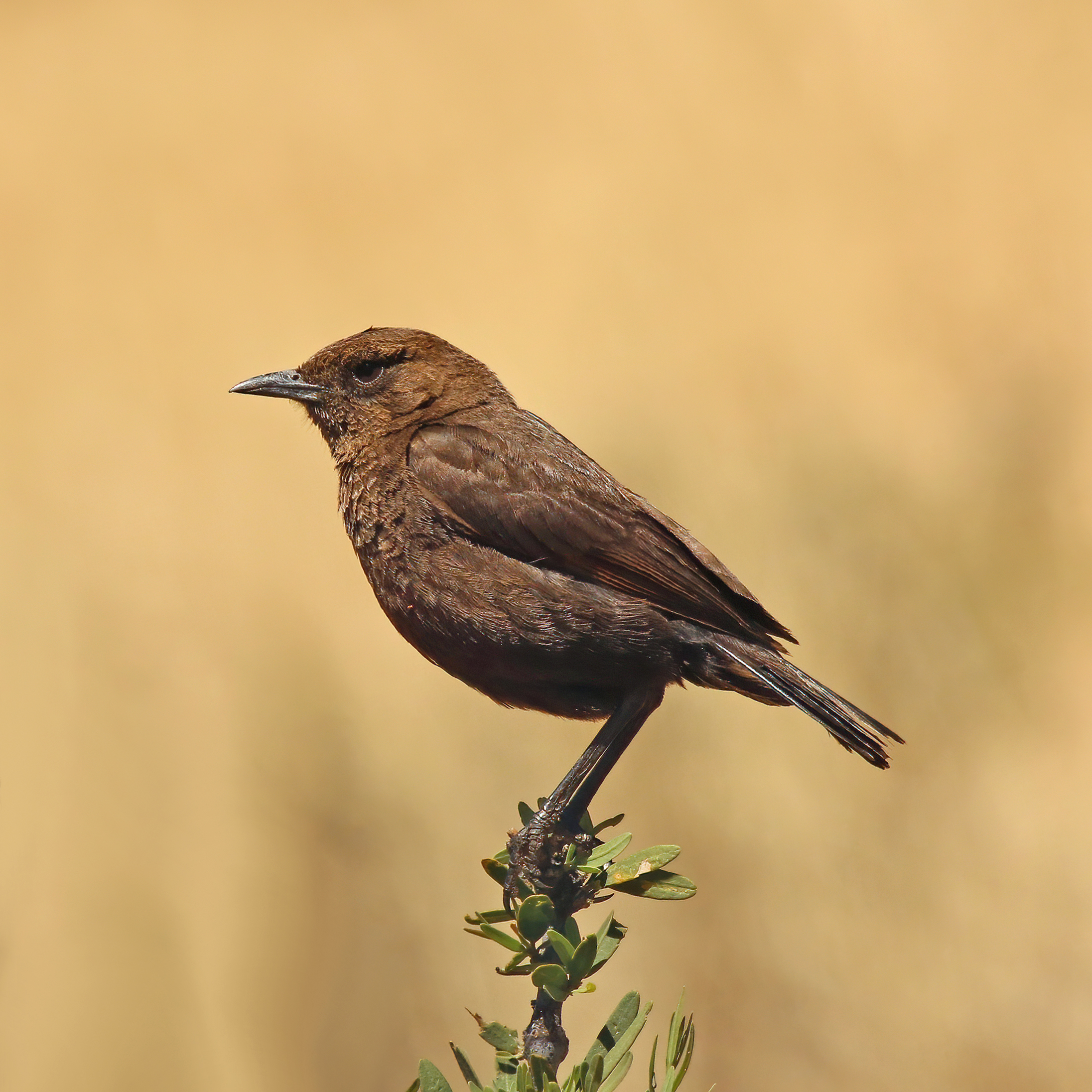
- Female; Tswalu Kalahari Reserve, South Africa

Conservation status
- Least Concern (IUCN 3.1)

Scientific classification
- Kingdom: Animalia
- Phylum: Chordata
- Class: Aves
- Order: Passeriformes
- Family: Muscicapidae
- Genus: Myrmecocichla
- Species: M. formicivora

Binomial name
- Myrmecocichla formicivora (Wilkes, 1817)

= Ant-eating chat =

Species of bird

The ant-eating chat or southern anteater-chat (Myrmecocichla formicivora) is a species of bird in the family Muscicapidae. It is found in Botswana, Eswatini, Lesotho, Namibia, South Africa, and Zimbabwe. Its natural habitats are subtropical or tropical dry shrubland and subtropical or tropical dry lowland grassland.

== Description ==
The species is sexually dimorphic with the male almost entirely black and the female brown with a grey bill and legs.
