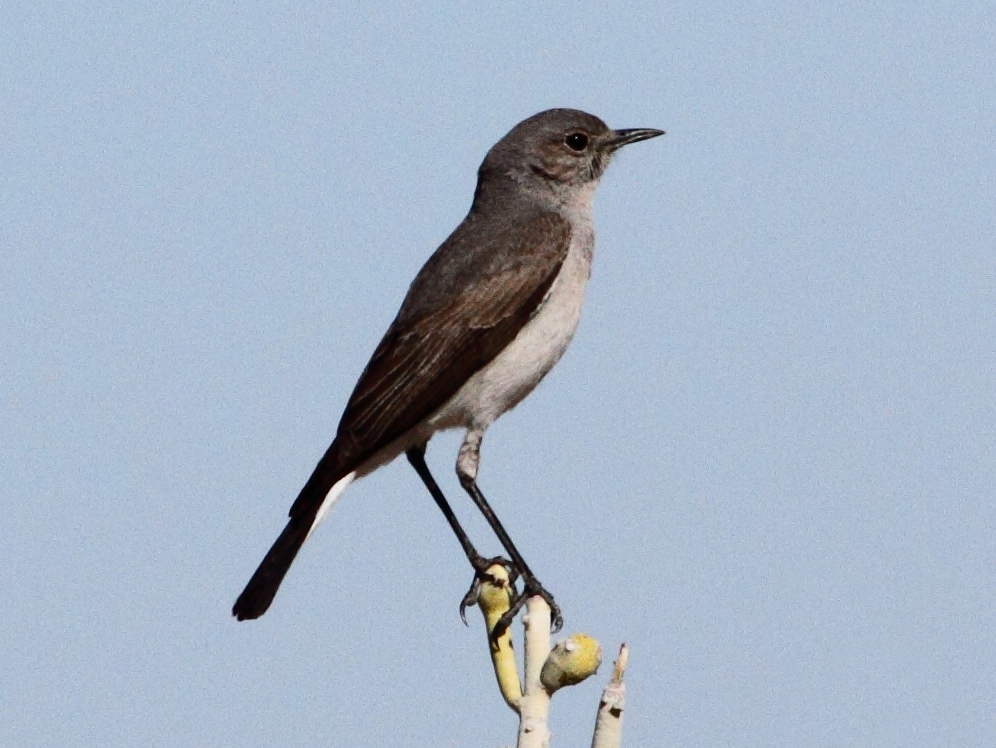
- Karoo chat (Emarginata schlegelii) in South Africa

Scientific classification
- Kingdom: Animalia
- Phylum: Chordata
- Class: Aves
- Order: Passeriformes
- Family: Muscicapidae
- Genus: Emarginata; Shelley, 1896

Type species
- Luscinia sinuata Sundevall, 1858

= Emarginata =

Genus of birds

Emarginata is a genus of birds in the Old World flycatcher family Muscicapidae that occur in southern Africa.

The three species in the genus were previously placed in the genus Cercomela. A molecular phylogenetic study published in 2010 found that Cercomela was polyphyletic and that the type species Cercomela melanura (the blackstart) lay in a clade containing members of Oenanthe. A more comprehensive study published in 2012 confirmed the earlier results. In order to create monophyletic genera the species assigned to Cercomela were moved into other genera. Three species were placed in the resurrected genus Emarginata that had been introduced by the English ornithologist George Ernest Shelley in 1896 with Emarginata sinuata, the sickle-winged chat, as the type species.

The three species in the genus are:

- Sickle-winged chat (Emarginata sinuata)
- Karoo chat (Emarginata schlegelii)
- Tractrac chat (Emarginata tractrac)
