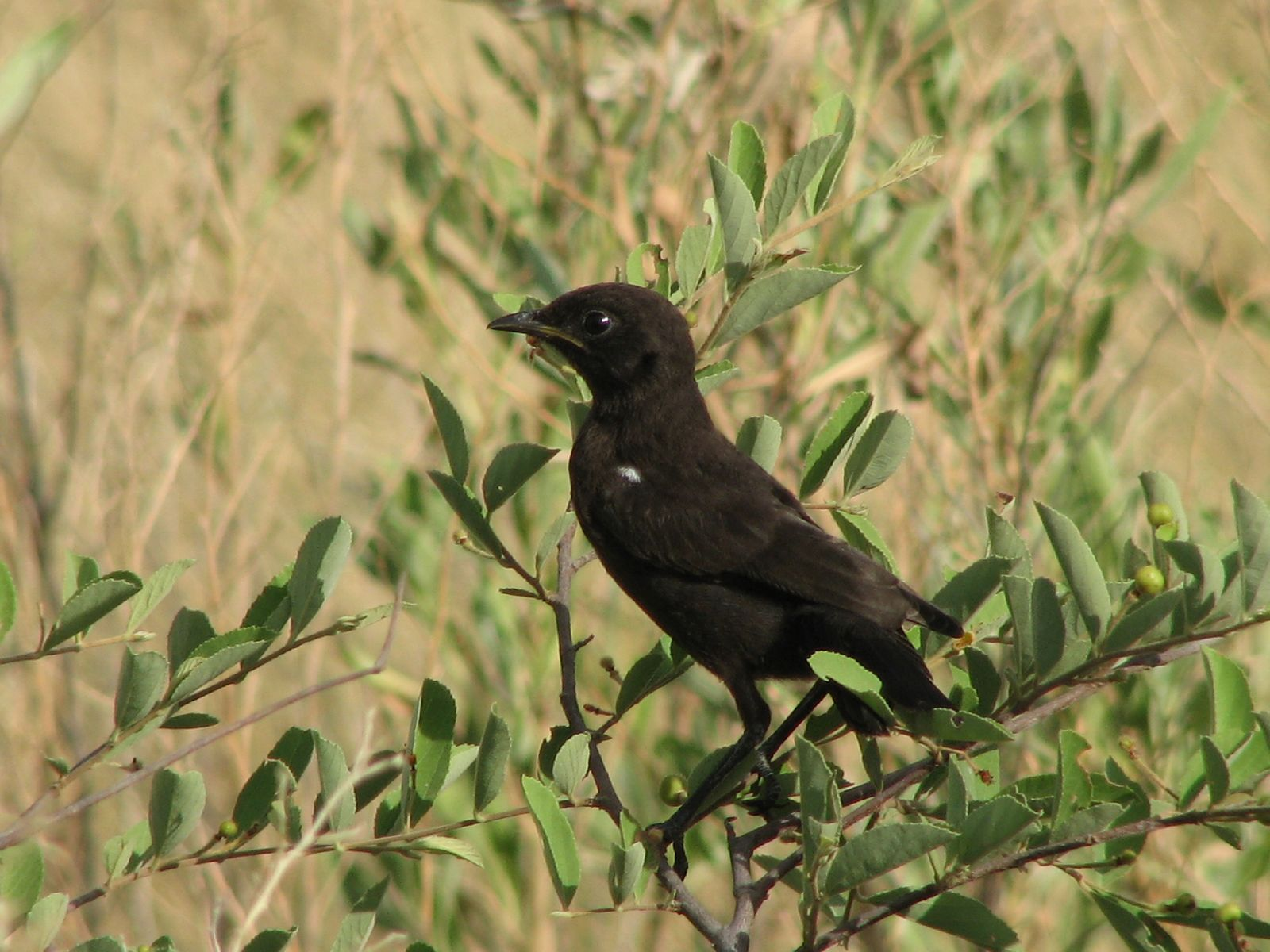
- Ant-eating chat (Myrmecocichla formicivora)

Scientific classification
- Kingdom: Animalia
- Phylum: Chordata
- Class: Aves
- Order: Passeriformes
- Family: Muscicapidae
- Genus: Myrmecocichla; Cabanis, 1851

Type species
- Oenanthe formicivora Vieillot, 1818

= Myrmecocichla =

Genus of birds

Myrmecocichla is a genus of passerine birds in the Old World chat and flycatcher family Muscicapidae. Species in this genus are found in Africa.

== Taxonomy ==
The genus Myrmecocichla was introduced in 1851 by the German ornithologist Jean Cabanis who listed several species in the genus but did not specify the type. In 1855 the English zoologist George Gray designated the type as Oenanthe formicivora Vieillot, 1818. This is a junior synonym of Motacilla formicivora Wilkes, 1817, the ant-eating chat. The genus name combines the Ancient Greek μυρμηξ/murmēx, μυρμηκος/murmēkos meaning "ant" with κιχλη/kikhlē meaning "thrush".

The genus contains the following seven species:

Image	Common name	Scientific name	Distribution
	Anteater chat	Myrmecocichla aethiops	Sahel and East African montane forests
	Congo moor chat	Myrmecocichla tholloni	Central Africa
	Ant-eating chat	Myrmecocichla formicivora	southern Africa
	Mountain chat	Myrmecocichla monticola	southern Africa
	Sooty chat	Myrmecocichla nigra	central Africa
	Rüppell's black chat	Myrmecocichla melaena	Ethiopian Highlands
	Arnot's chat	Myrmecocichla arnotti	Miombo woodlands
