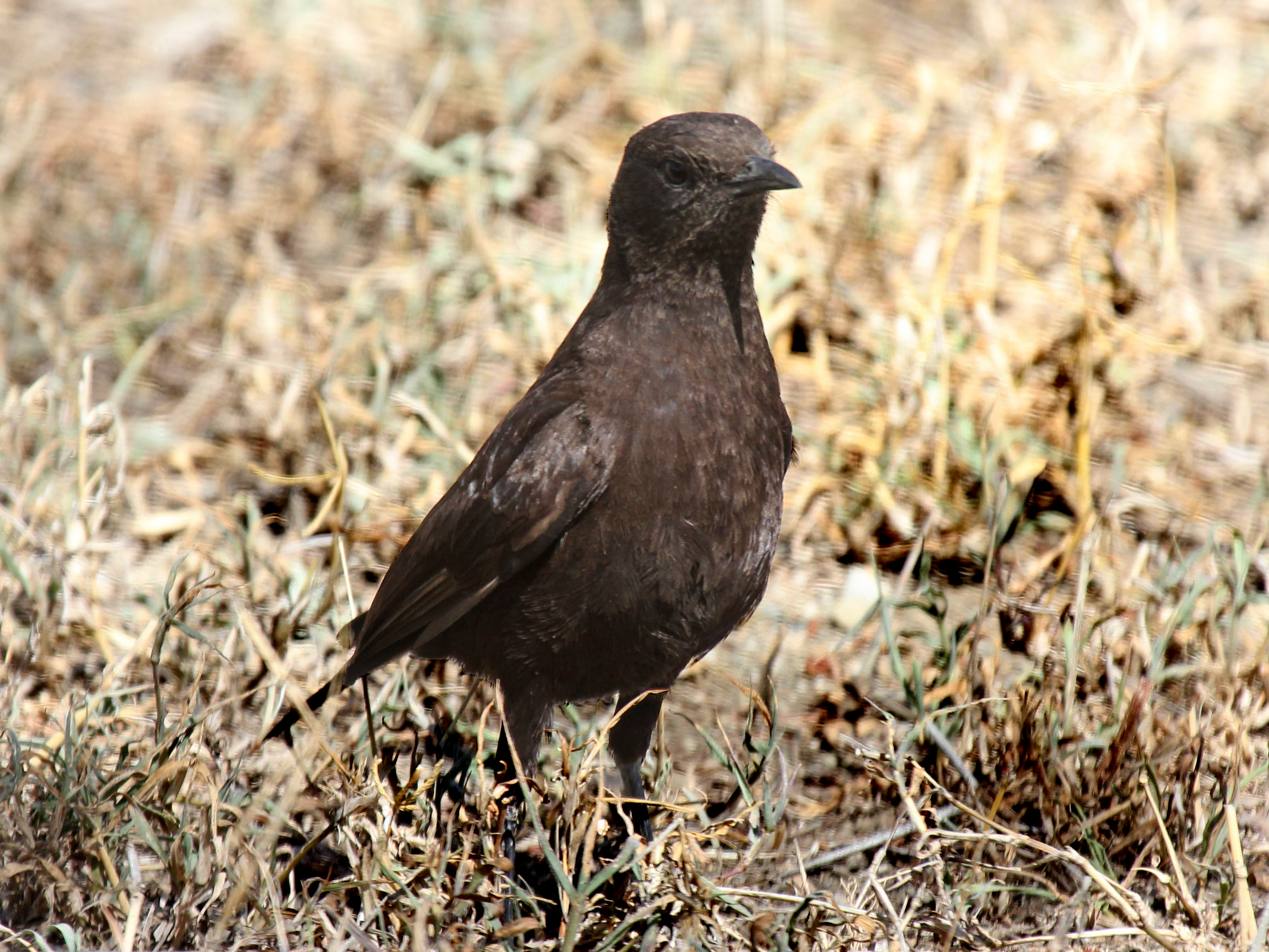

Conservation status
- Least Concern (IUCN 3.1)

Scientific classification
- Kingdom: Animalia
- Phylum: Chordata
- Class: Aves
- Order: Passeriformes
- Family: Muscicapidae
- Genus: Myrmecocichla
- Species: M. aethiops

Binomial name
- Myrmecocichla aethiops Cabanis, 1851

= Anteater chat =

Species of bird

The anteater chat or northern anteater-chat (Myrmecocichla aethiops) is a species of bird in the family Muscicapidae. It range extends across the Sahel and the East African montane forests. Its natural habitats are dry savanna, subtropical or tropical dry lowland grassland, and subtropical or tropical high-altitude grassland.

It has been observed to nest in abandoned wells in Nigeria
