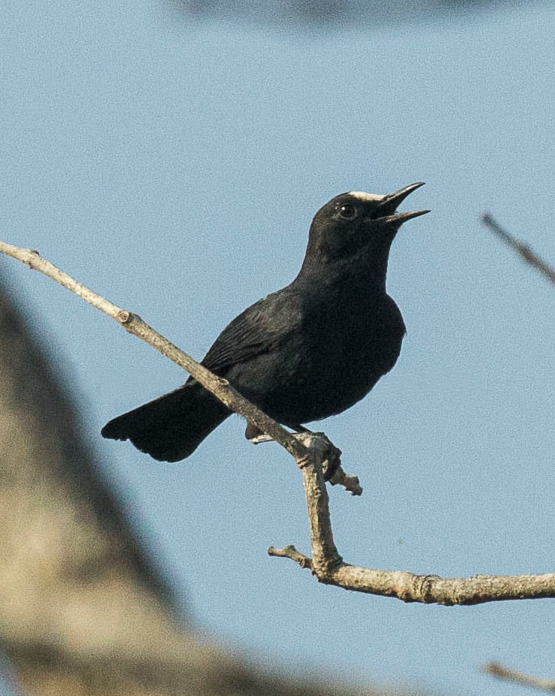

Conservation status
- Least Concern (IUCN 3.1)

Scientific classification
- Kingdom: Animalia
- Phylum: Chordata
- Class: Aves
- Order: Passeriformes
- Family: Muscicapidae
- Genus: Oenanthe
- Species: O. albifrons

Binomial name
- Oenanthe albifrons (Rüppell, 1837)

Synonyms
- Pentholaea albifrons Myrmecocichla albifrons

= White-fronted black chat =

Species of bird

The white-fronted black chat (Oenanthe albifrons) is a species of passerine bird in the family Muscicapidae. It is native to the Sudan (region). Its natural habitats are moist savanna and subtropical or tropical dry shrubland.

The white-fronted black chat was formerly included in the genus Myrmecocichla. Molecular phylogenetic studies published in 2010 and 2012 found that the species was phylogenetically nested within the genus Oenanthe. As part of a reorganization of the chat species to create monophyletic genera, the white-fronted black chat was moved to the genus Oenanthe.
