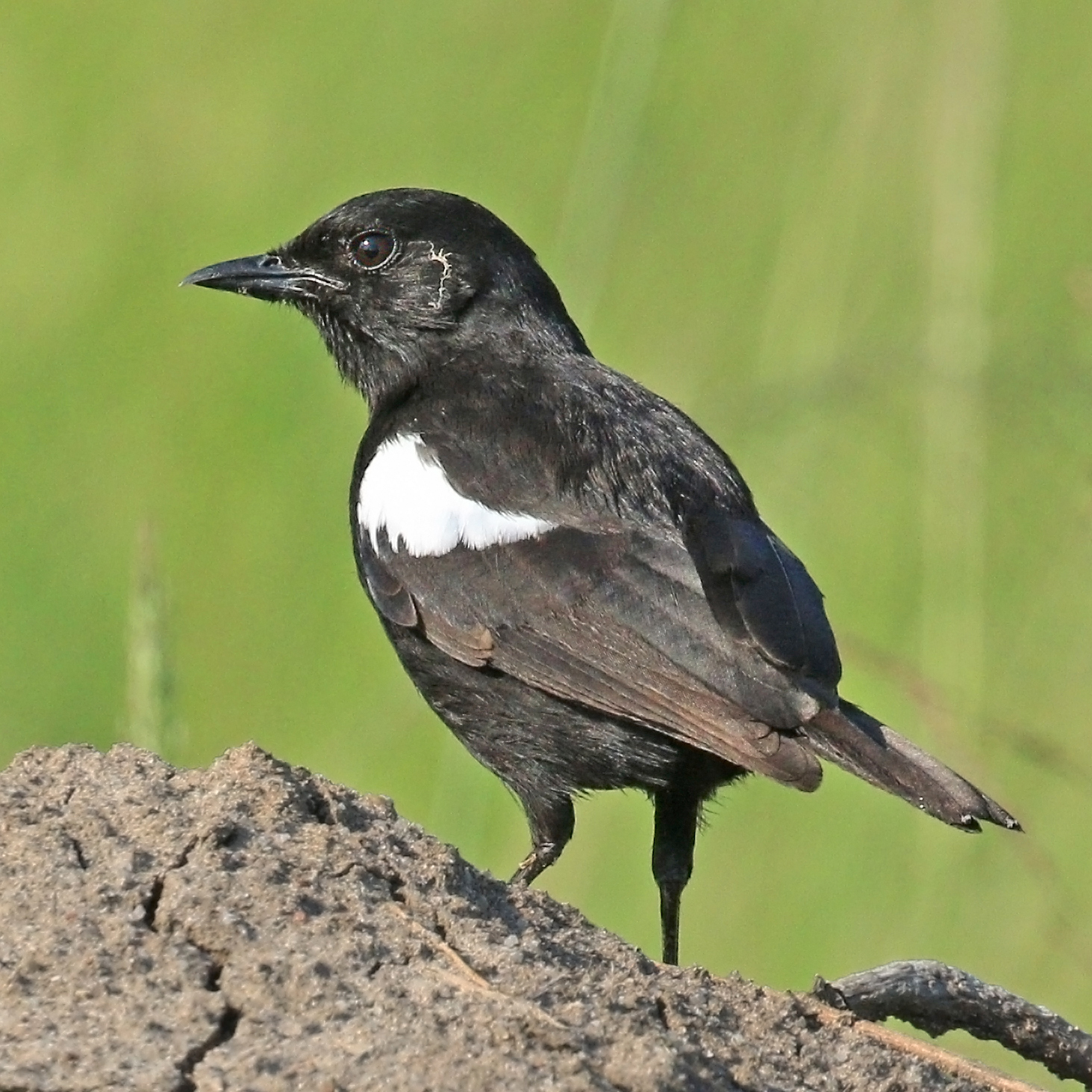
- Male, Uganda
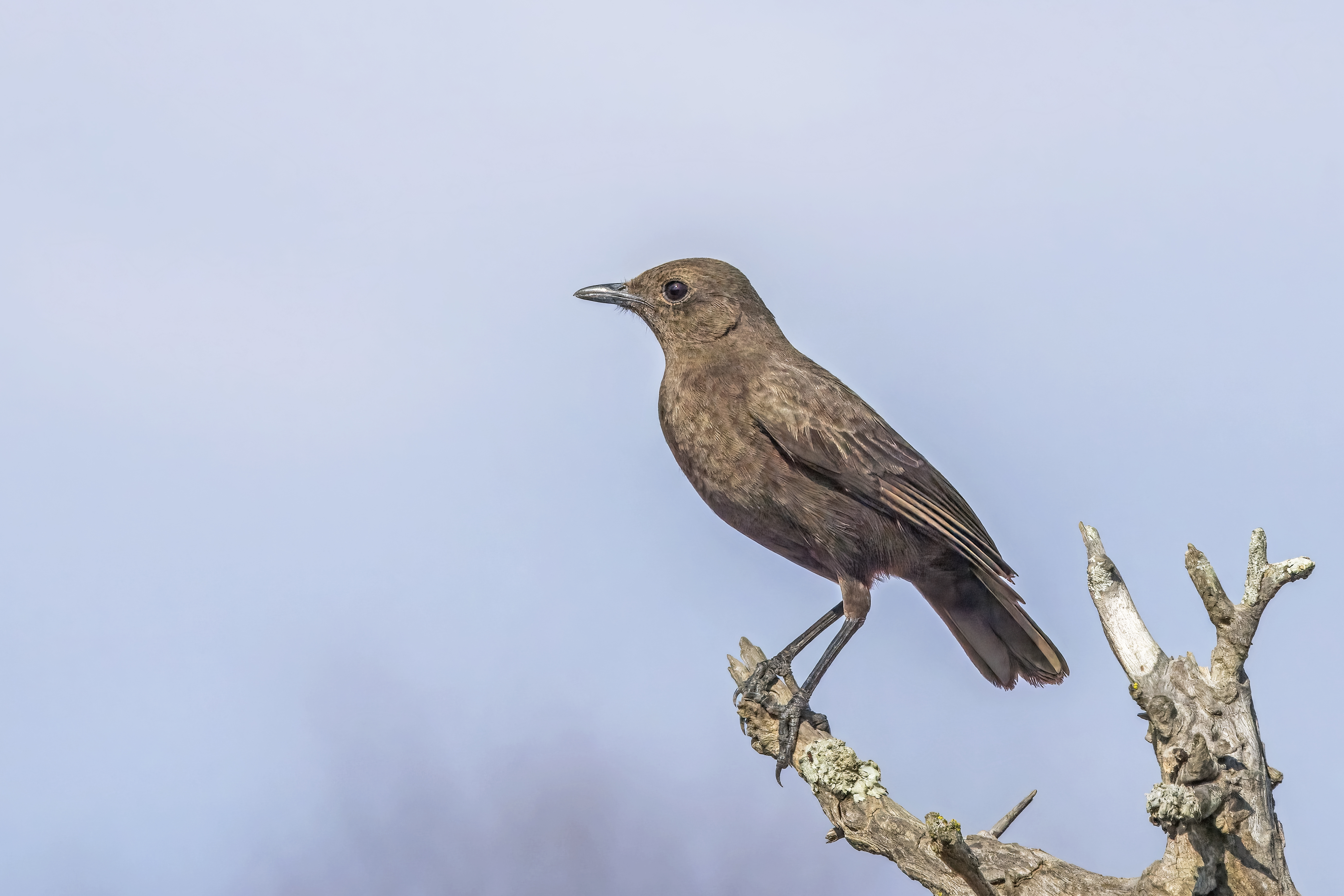
- Female, Tanzania

Conservation status
- Least Concern (IUCN 3.1)

Scientific classification
- Kingdom: Animalia
- Phylum: Chordata
- Class: Aves
- Order: Passeriformes
- Family: Muscicapidae
- Genus: Myrmecocichla
- Species: M. nigra

Binomial name
- Myrmecocichla nigra (Vieillot, 1818)

= Sooty chat =

Species of bird

The sooty chat (Myrmecocichla nigra) is an African songbird of the chat subfamily.

== Description ==
It is 15 to 16 cm (6 to 6.25 inches) long, stocky and relatively short-tailed for a chat. The adult male's plumage is glossy black except for white patches on the upper wings that are usually visible or only partly concealed (as in the photograph at upper right) when the bird is at rest. The female and young are very dark brown.

== Song ==
The song (in Kenya and northern Tanzania) is described as "prolonged, sweet and musical, sometimes given in flight, wee tewee tuweer, skwik-skueeeeer, cueee-eeeee-cuweeeeer, eee-euwee-tee, tseuwee-tew-skweeer-tsi-seet…." This species sometimes imitates other birds.

== Range ==
It occurs widely but discontinuously in African grasslands, from Senegal east to Kenya and south to Angola and Zambia. Its range is estimated at 3,400,000 km^{2}, and it is considered "frequent" in at least parts of that area.
