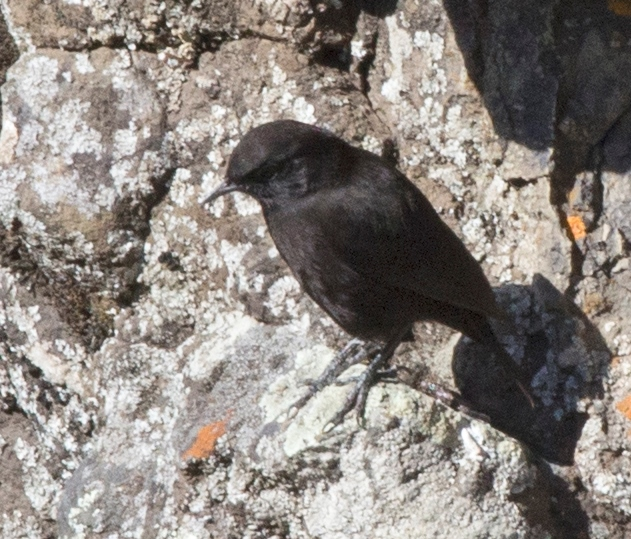

Conservation status
- Least Concern (IUCN 3.1)

Scientific classification
- Kingdom: Animalia
- Phylum: Chordata
- Class: Aves
- Order: Passeriformes
- Family: Muscicapidae
- Genus: Myrmecocichla
- Species: M. melaena

Binomial name
- Myrmecocichla melaena (Rüppell, 1837)

= Rüppell's black chat =

Species of bird

Rüppell's black chat (Myrmecocichla melaena) is a species of bird in the family Muscicapidae. It is found in the Ethiopian Highlands of Eritrea and Ethiopia from 1,800 to 2,700 metres elevation.
