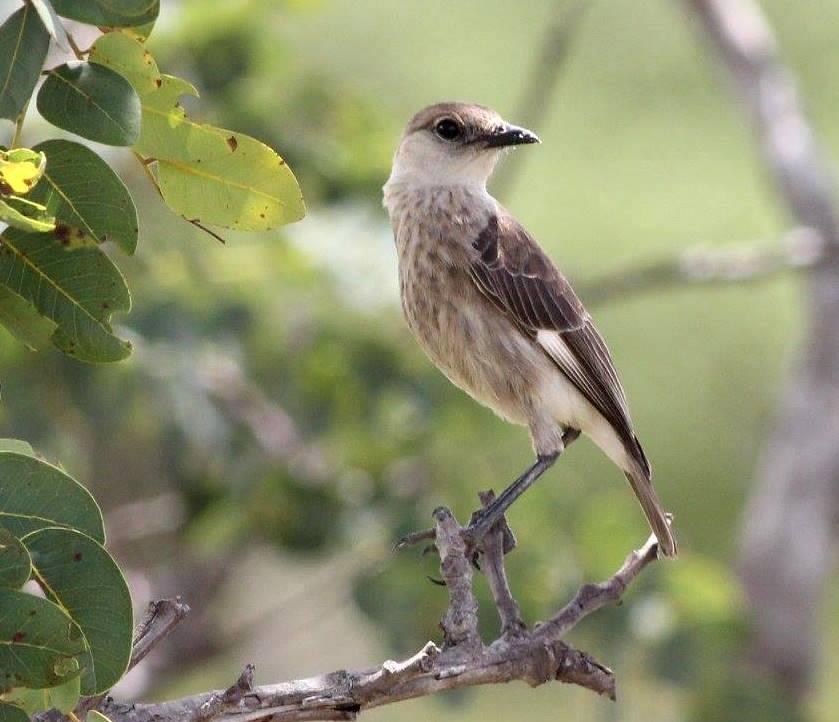
- M. tholloni in Angola

Conservation status
- Least Concern (IUCN 3.1)

Scientific classification
- Kingdom: Animalia
- Phylum: Chordata
- Class: Aves
- Order: Passeriformes
- Family: Muscicapidae
- Genus: Myrmecocichla
- Species: M. tholloni

Binomial name
- Myrmecocichla tholloni (Oustalet, 1886)

= Congo moor chat =

Species of bird

The Congo moor chat or Congo moor-chat (Myrmecocichla tholloni) is a species of bird in the family Muscicapidae.

== Range ==
It is found in Angola, Central African Republic, Republic of the Congo, Democratic Republic of the Congo, and Gabon. Its natural habitats are subtropical or tropical dry lowland grassland and subtropical or tropical seasonally wet or flooded lowland grassland.
