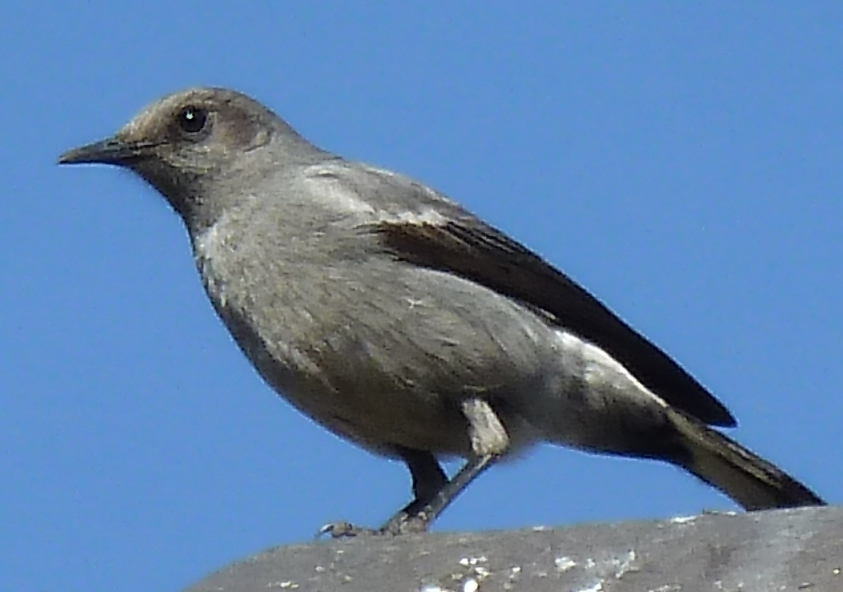

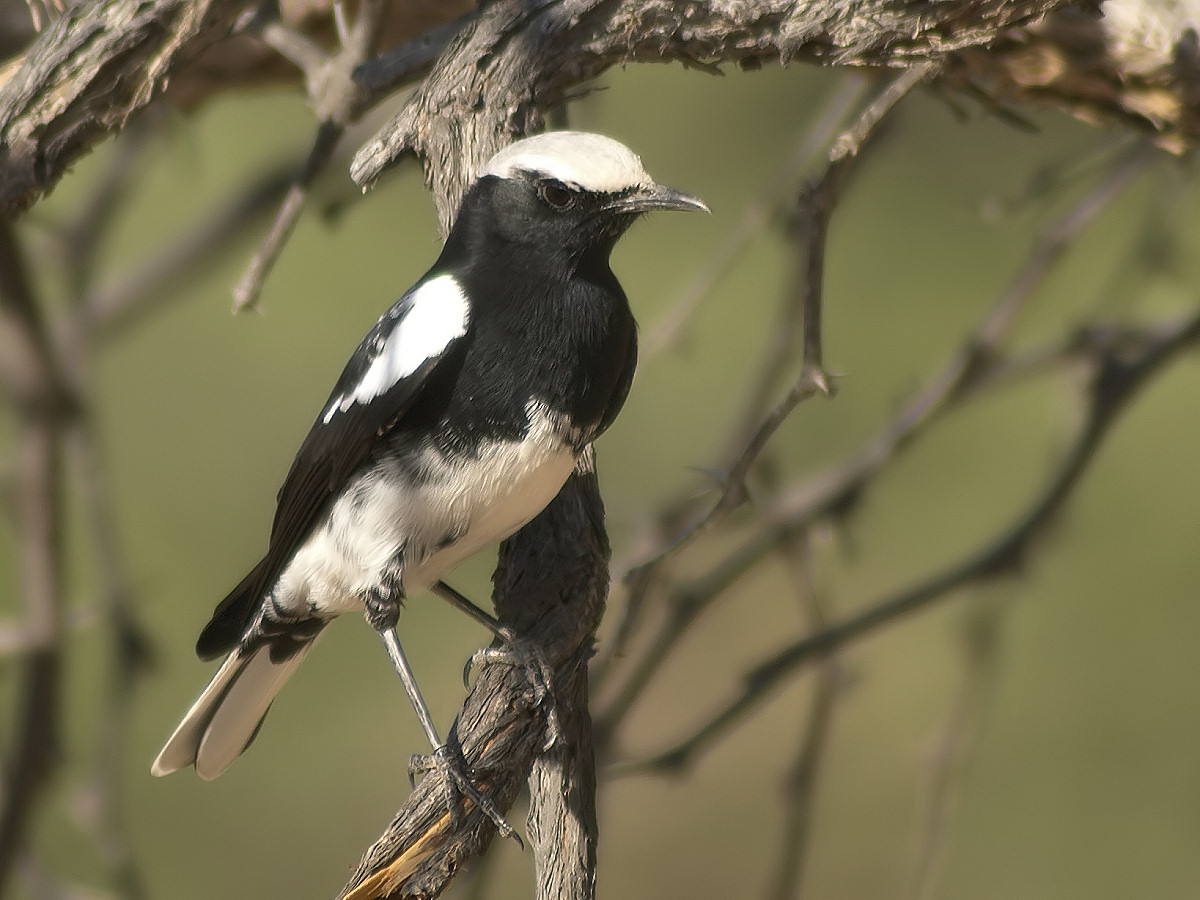
- Males of the nominate (top) and westerly race, O. m. atmorii (bottom)

Conservation status
- Least Concern (IUCN 3.1)

Scientific classification
- Kingdom: Animalia
- Phylum: Chordata
- Class: Aves
- Order: Passeriformes
- Family: Muscicapidae
- Genus: Myrmecocichla
- Species: M. monticola

Binomial name
- Myrmecocichla monticola (Vieillot, 1818)
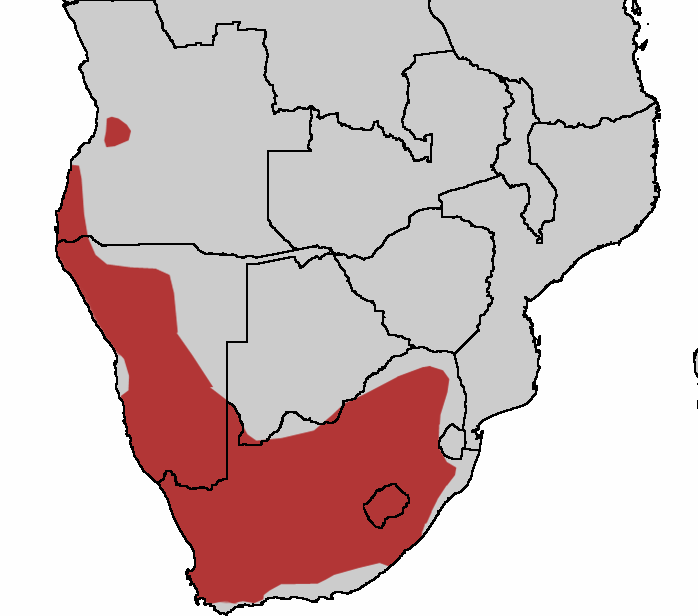
- resident range

Synonyms
- Oenanthe monticola Vieillot, 1918

= Mountain chat =

Species of bird

The mountain chat or mountain wheatear (Myrmecocichla monticola) is a small insectivorous passerine bird that is endemic to southwestern Africa.

== Range and habitat ==
This non-migratory chat is resident in mountainous and rocky habitats in Namibia, Botswana, South Africa and southernmost Angola.

== Description ==
The mountain chat is 18–20 cm long, and like other chats, it has a distinctive tail pattern, with a white rump and outer tail feathers. Its legs and pointed bill are black. The male is very variable in plumage, although the tail pattern and a white shoulder patch are always present. A white and black bird. The body plumage varies from pale grey to almost black, and it may or may not have a white crown to the head. The female is entirely dark brown apart from the white rump and outer tail.

== Habits ==
The mountain chat's song is a clear melodic whistle interspersed with harsh chatters. It is monogamous and nests on the ground amongst rocks, laying 2-4 white eggs. It eats insects and berries.

== Taxonomy ==
Along with other chats, this species was formerly classed as a member of the thrush family Turdidae, but based on studies published in 2004 and 2010, the Old World flycatcher family Muscicapidae is now preferred. The mountain wheatear was formerly placed in the genus Oenanthe. Molecular phylogenetic studies published in 2010 and 2012 found that the species was not closely related to the other members of Oenanthe and instead was genetically similar to the chats in the genus Myrmecocichla. The species was therefore assigned to Myrmecocichla.

== Gallery ==
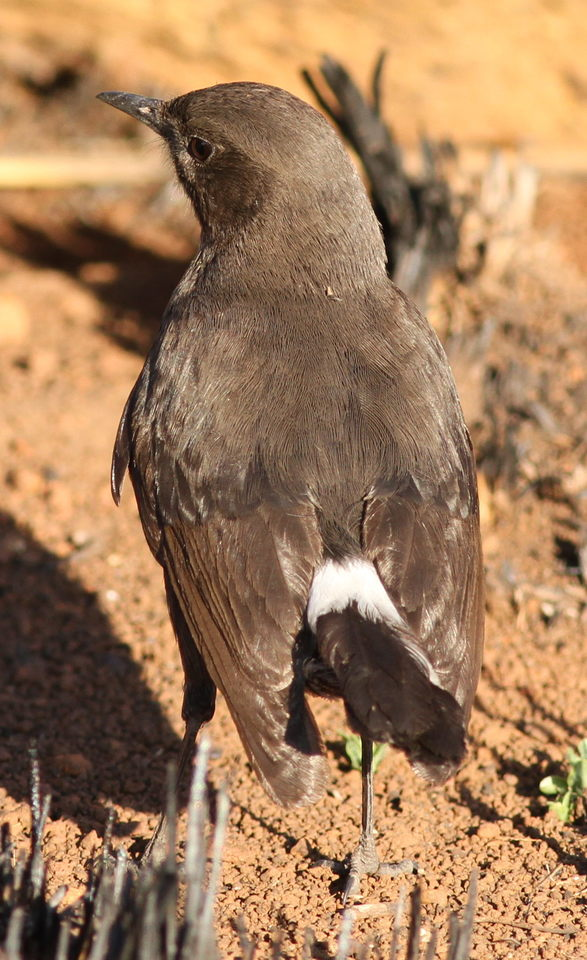
female

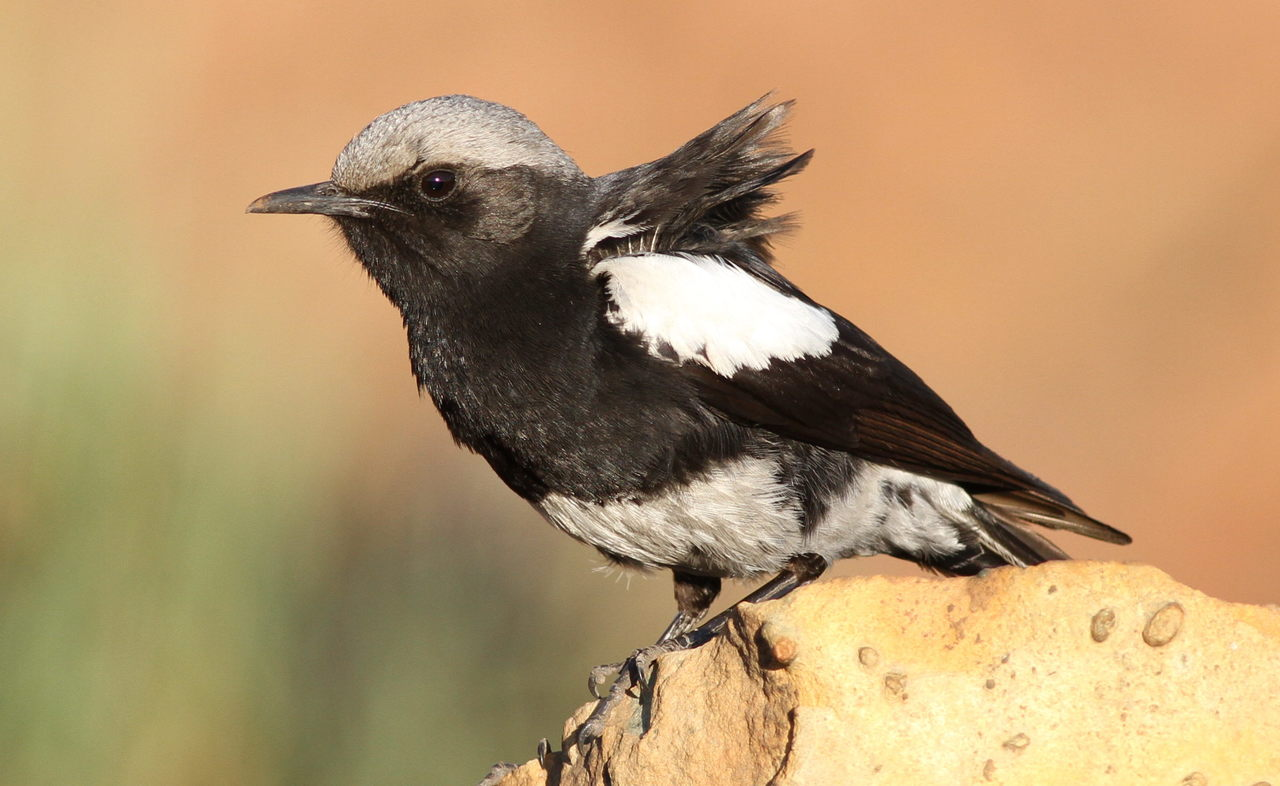
male with grey crown (nominate race)

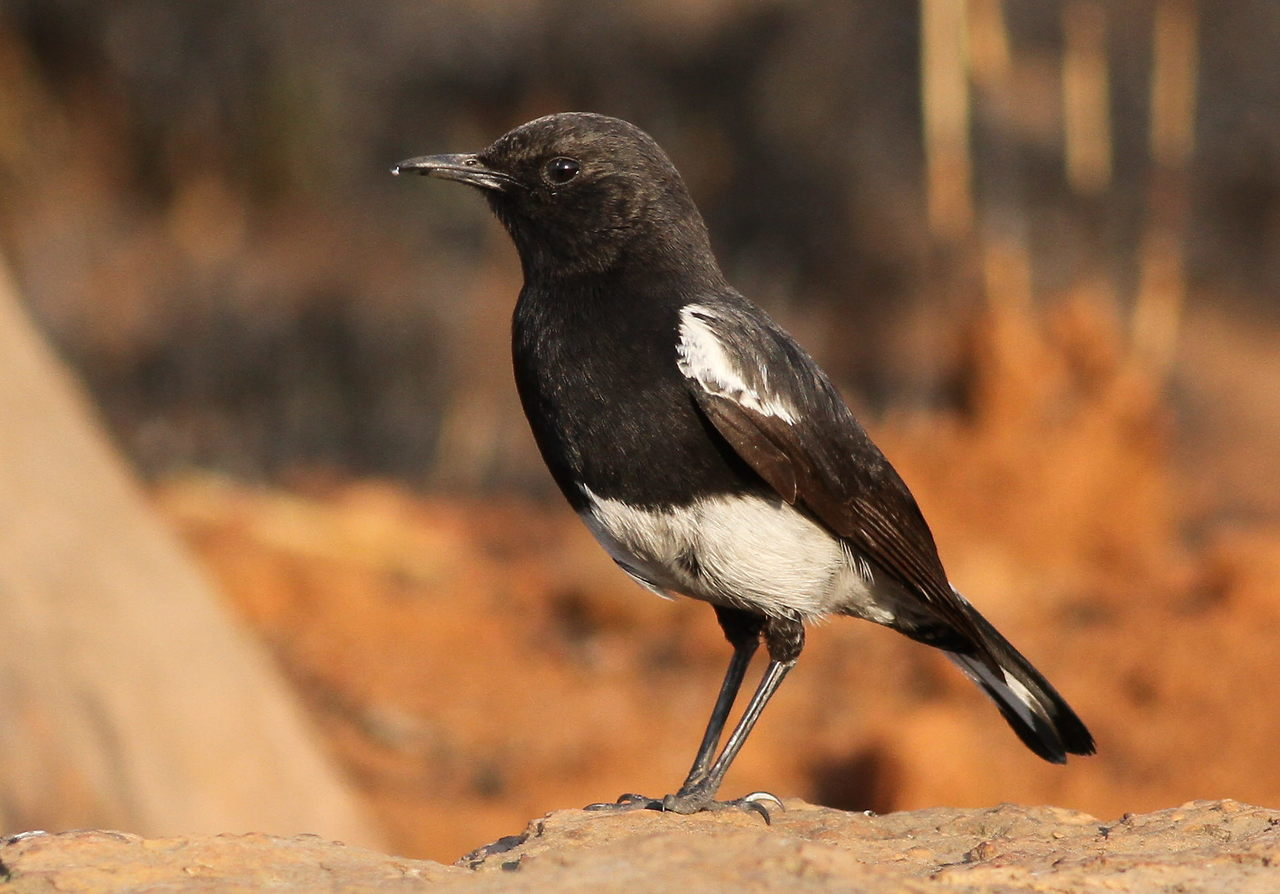
male with dusky crown (nominate race)
