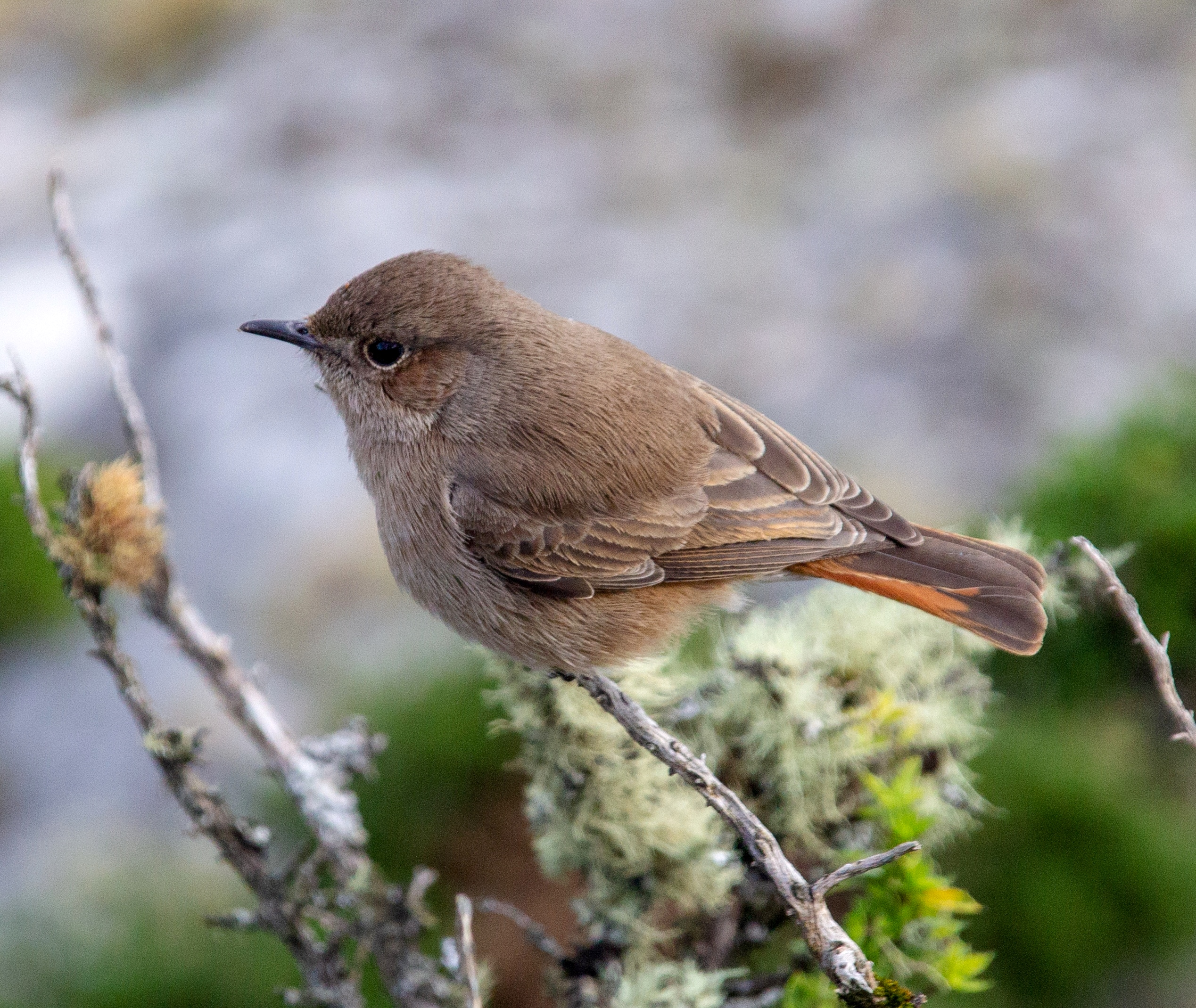
- Nominate subspecies on the Table Mountain plateau, Cape Town

Conservation status
- Least Concern (IUCN 3.1)

Scientific classification
- Kingdom: Animalia
- Phylum: Chordata
- Class: Aves
- Order: Passeriformes
- Family: Muscicapidae
- Genus: Oenanthe
- Species: O. familiaris

Binomial name
- Oenanthe familiaris (Wilkes, 1817)

Synonyms
- Cercomela familiaris (Wilkes, 1817); Motacilla familiaris Wilkes, 1917

= Familiar chat =

Species of bird

The familiar chat (Oenanthe familiaris) is a small passerine bird of the Old World flycatcher family Muscicapidae. It is a common resident breeder in Africa south of the Sahara in rocky and mountainous habitat and around human habitation.

== Taxonomy ==
The familiar chat was illustrated and described by the French naturalist François Levaillant in Volume 4 of his Histoire naturelle des oiseaux d'Afrique published in 1805. He named the bird, "Le Traquet Familier" but did not give the species a binomial name. The binomial name Motacilla familiaris was introduced by the English publisher John Wilkes in 1817. (Note: In 1960 Ernst Mayr and Raymond Andrew Paynter, Jr. incorrectly listed a later authority (Stephens 1826) in the 10th volume of the Check-list of Birds of the World.) The species was subsequently placed in the genus Cercomela introduced by Charles Lucien Bonaparte in 1856. Molecular phylogenetic studies published in 2010 and 2012 found that the genus Cercomela was polyphyletic with five species, including the familiar chat, phylogenetically nested within the genus Oenanthe. As part of a reorganization of the species to create monophyletic genera, the familiar chat was moved to the genus Oenanthe.

There are 7 recognised subspecies:

- O. f. falkensteini (Cabanis, 1875) — Senegal to northwest Ethiopia, south Uganda and Tanzania
- O. f. omoensis (Neumann, 1904) — southeast Sudan, southwest Ethiopia, northwest Kenya and northeast Uganda
- O. f. angolensis (Lynes, 1926) — west Angola and north Namibia
- O. f. galtoni (Strickland, 1853) — east Namibia, west Botswana and northern South Africa
- O. f. hellmayri (Reichenow, 1902) — southeast Botswana to south Mozambique and northeast South Africa
- O. f. actuosa (Clancey, 1966) — east South Africa and Lesotho
- O. f. familiaris (Wilkes, 1817) — southern South Africa

== Description ==
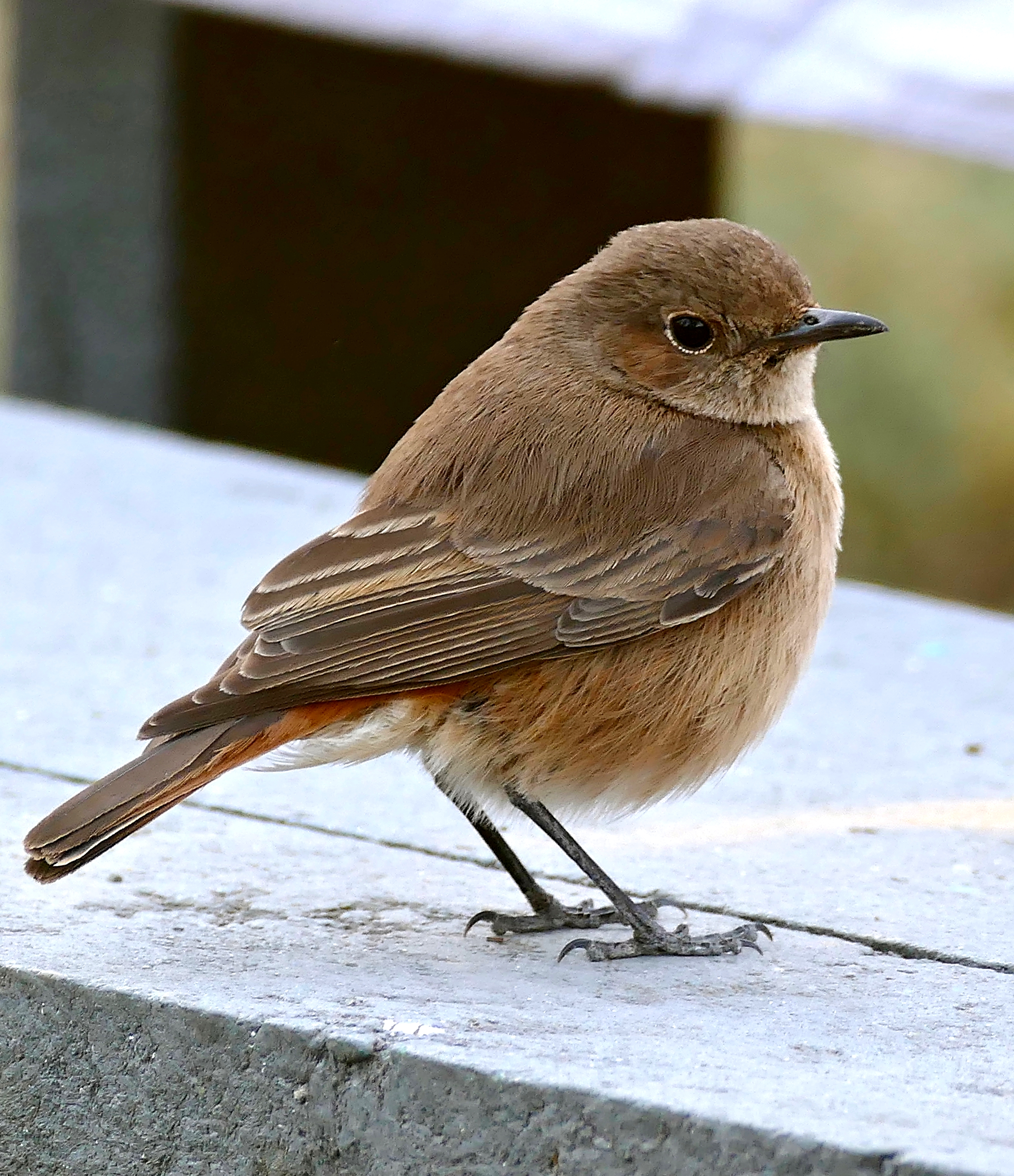
in Eastern Cape province, South Africa

The familiar chat is a dumpy short-tailed bird 14–15 cm (5.5–5.9 in) long. The adult's upperparts are a dull brown with warmer brown ear coverts behind the eye. The underparts vary from off-white to pale grey-brown, and the rump and outer tail feathers are rufous with a dark brown tip. The central tail feathers are dark brown. The short straight bill and the legs and feet are black. The sexes are alike, but the juvenile is similar to the adult but has buff spots above and a scaly pattern on the breast.

The familiar chat has a soft "shek-shek" alarm call. The song is a warbling trill.

== Behaviour ==
=== Breeding ===
The familiar chat is monogamous. It breeds between December and March in most of west Africa, but between March and May in Nigeria and mainly between October and November in South Africa. It builds a thick cup-shaped nest of plant material lined with hair, wool and feathers. The nest is usually placed in a hole in the ground, but rock faces and buildings are also used. This species will use nest boxes or a disused sociable weaver nest. The clutch is 2-4 greenish-blue eggs decorated with reddish-brown speckling. The eggs hatch after 13–15 days. The nestlings are fed by both parents and fledge after 13–15 days. Usually only a single brood is raised each year.

The familiar chat is typically seen sitting on a rock, or hopping on bare patches of soil. It has a habit of flicking its wings once or twice every time it moves. It is seen in small family groups of up to five birds, and is invariably tame and approachable. It eats insects, fruit, animal fat and household or farmyard scraps.

The Afrikaans name for this species "spekvreter" means "fat-eater", and comes from the fact that it developed the habit of feeding on the lard used to grease wagon axles by the voortrekkers.

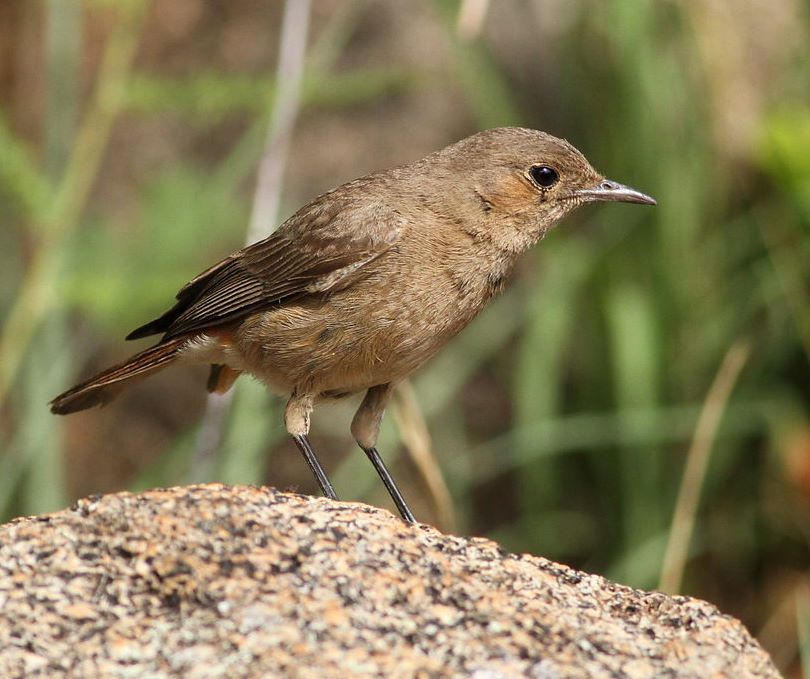
O. f. hellmayri in Pilanesberg National Park, South Africa

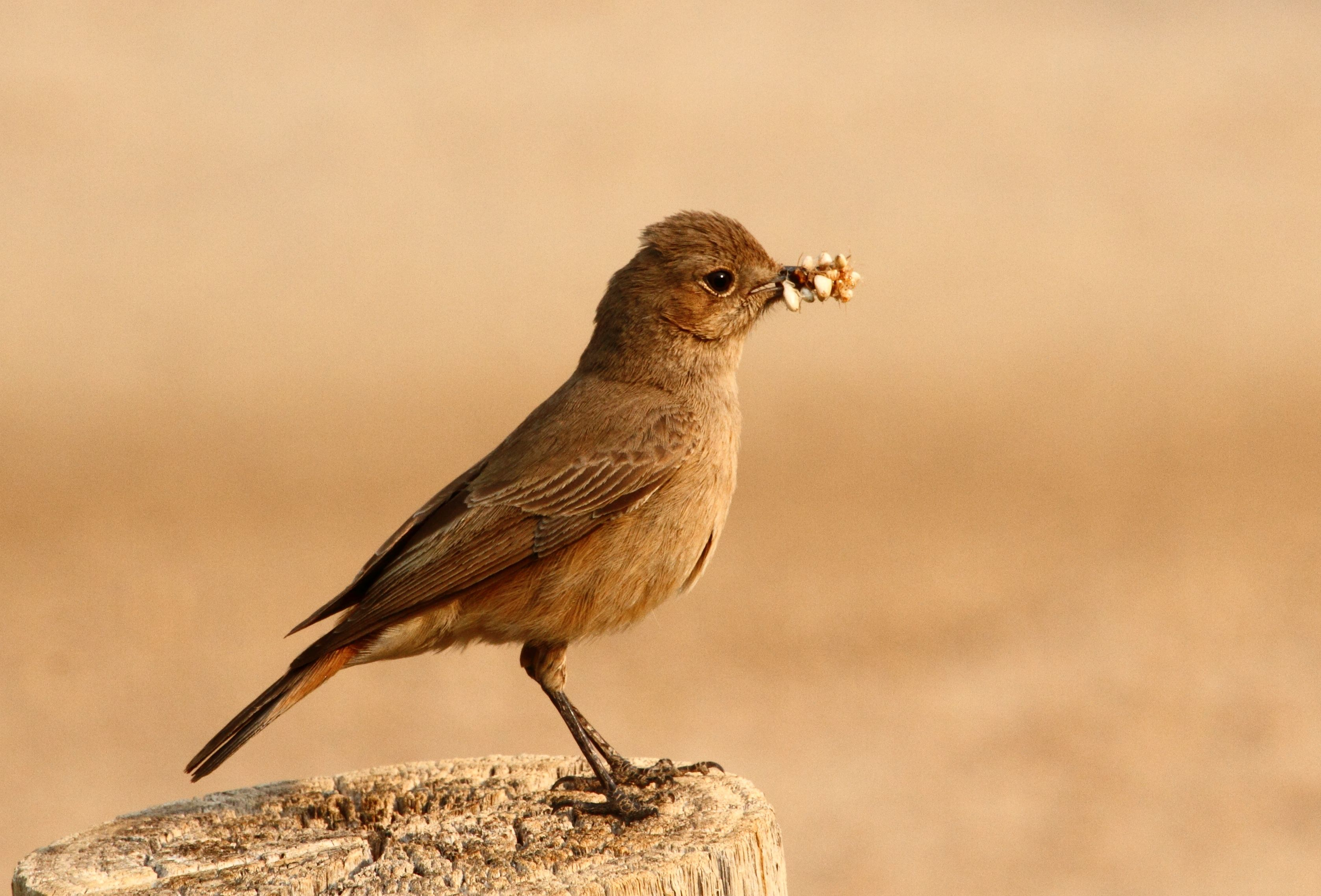
O. f. galtoni with termite prey

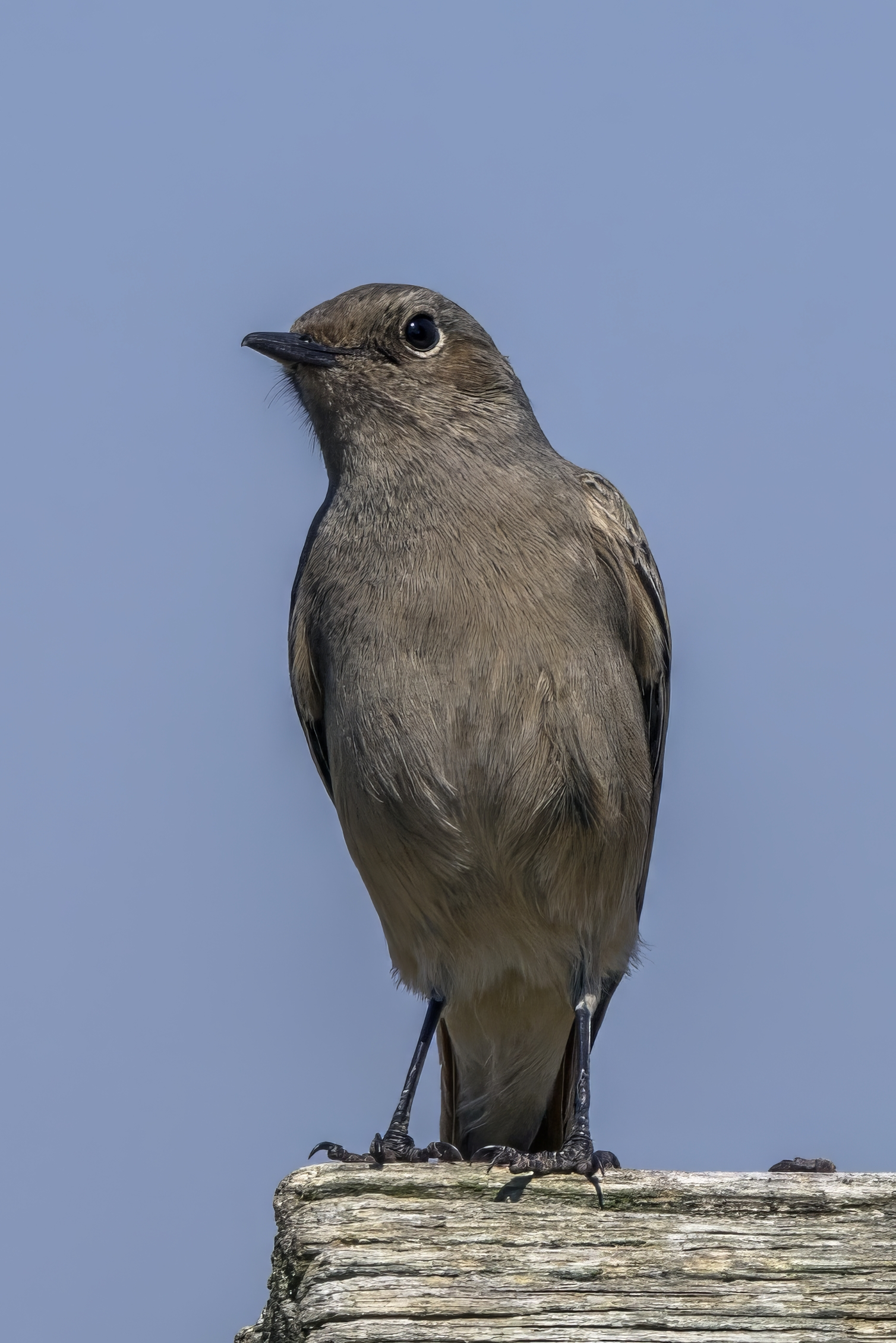
O. f. hellmaryi, Graskop, South Africa
