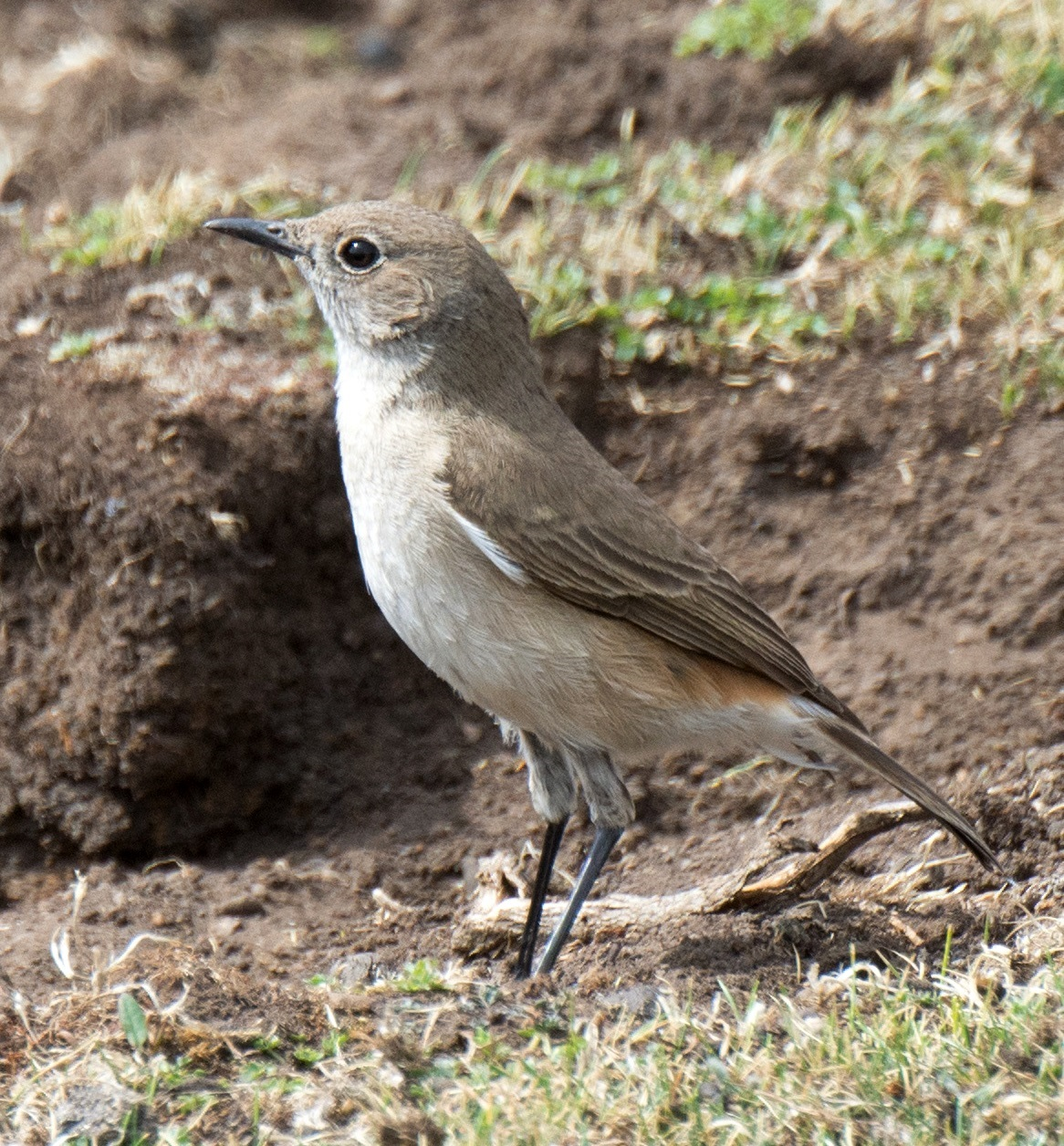
- At Sani Pass in the Drakensberg

Conservation status
- Least Concern (IUCN 3.1)

Scientific classification
- Kingdom: Animalia
- Phylum: Chordata
- Class: Aves
- Order: Passeriformes
- Family: Muscicapidae
- Genus: Emarginata
- Species: E. sinuata

Binomial name
- Emarginata sinuata (Sundevall, 1858)

Synonyms
- Cercomela sinuata

= Sickle-winged chat =

Species of bird

The sickle-winged chat or sicklewing chat (Emarginata sinuata) is a small passerine bird of the Old World flycatcher family Muscicapidae endemic to southern Africa. It is a common resident breeder in South Africa and Lesotho, and is also found in southernmost areas of Botswana and Namibia. Its habitat is Karoo scrub, short grassland, and barren sandy or stony areas. In western coastal areas, it also occurs on agricultural land.

== Taxonomy ==
The first formal description of the sickle-winged chat was by the Swedish zoologist Carl Jakob Sundevall in 1858 under the binomial name Luscinia sinuata. The species was subsequently placed in the genus Cercomela introduced by Charles Lucien Bonaparte in 1856. It was moved to the current genus, Emarginata, after molecular phylogenetic studies published in 2010 and 2012 found that Cercomela was polyphyletic. The specific epithet sinuata is the Latin for "curved".

There are 3 subspecies:

- E. s. hypernephela (Clancey, 1956) — Lesotho
- E. s. ensifera (Clancey, 1958) — southern Namibia, western and central South Africa
- E. s. sinuata (Sundevall, 1858) — southern South Africa

== Description ==
The sickle-winged chat is around 15 cm (5.9 in) in length and weighs 17–20 g (0.60–0.71 oz). Its upperparts are dark grey, but it has brown wings and a rufous patch behind the eye. The tail and rump are buff-pink, with an inverted wedge of black at the end of the tail. Its underparts are off-white, the short straight bill, legs and feet are black and the eye is brown. The sexes are similar, but the juvenile has buff tips to its feathers.

The contrast between the dark upperparts and the much paler underparts distinguish this species from the more uniformly coloured familiar chat. It also has the pale salmon-buff on the rump extending only onto the base of the tail, whereas the familiar chat has a richer hue which almost reaches the tip of the tail.

The sickle-winged chat has a chak-chak call and a warbled song.

== Behaviour ==
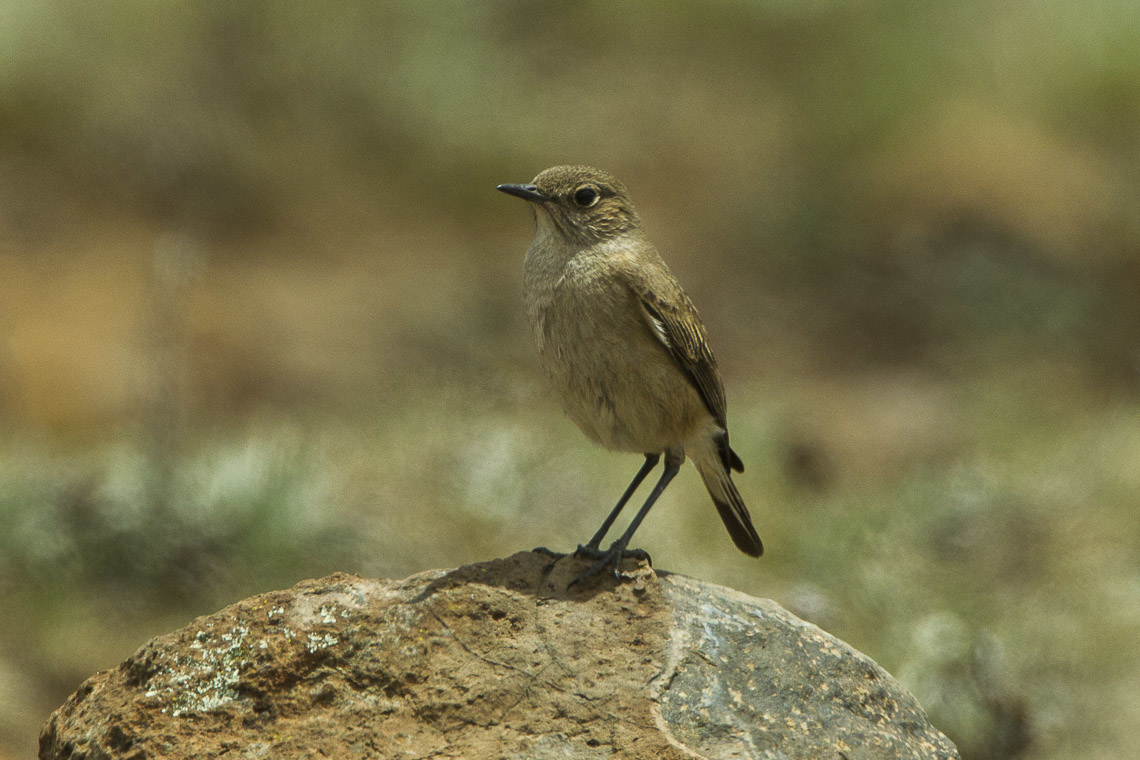
In Natal, South Africa

The sickle-winged chat builds a cup-shaped nest of straw and leaves on the ground, usually under a bush or shrub. It lays two to four green or blue eggs. This species is monogamous.

The sickle-winged chat is usually seen singly or in pairs. It forages on the ground or at the base of trees for insects.

In comparison with the familiar chat, it spends more time on the ground and runs more swiftly. It flicks its wings, but less frequently than the familiar chat.

== Conservation status ==
This common species has a large range, with an estimated extent of 850,000 km^{2}. The population size is believed to be large, and the species is not believed to approach the thresholds for the population decline criterion of the IUCN Red List (i.e. declining more than 30% in ten years or three generations). For these reasons, the species is evaluated as Least Concern.
