= John Pass (engraver) =

English engraver

John Pass (c.1770–after 1824) was an English engraver.

== Life ==
Pass was an established copper plate engraver in Pentonville, London.

We know an engraving of Joan of Arc by him, based on Godefroy, dated 1794.

He made plates for The History, Civil and Ecclesiastical, and Survey of the Antiquities of Winchester (1798–1801) by John Milner.

John Wilkes the London bookseller, who was from Winchester, knew him at the end of the 18th century, and took him on for illustrations of his Encyclopaedia Londoniensis. Pass produced plates for volume 13 of the work.

He should not be confused with John Paas who was murdered in Leicester by James Cook in 1832.
