= John Wilkes (printer) =

English printer, bookseller and stationer

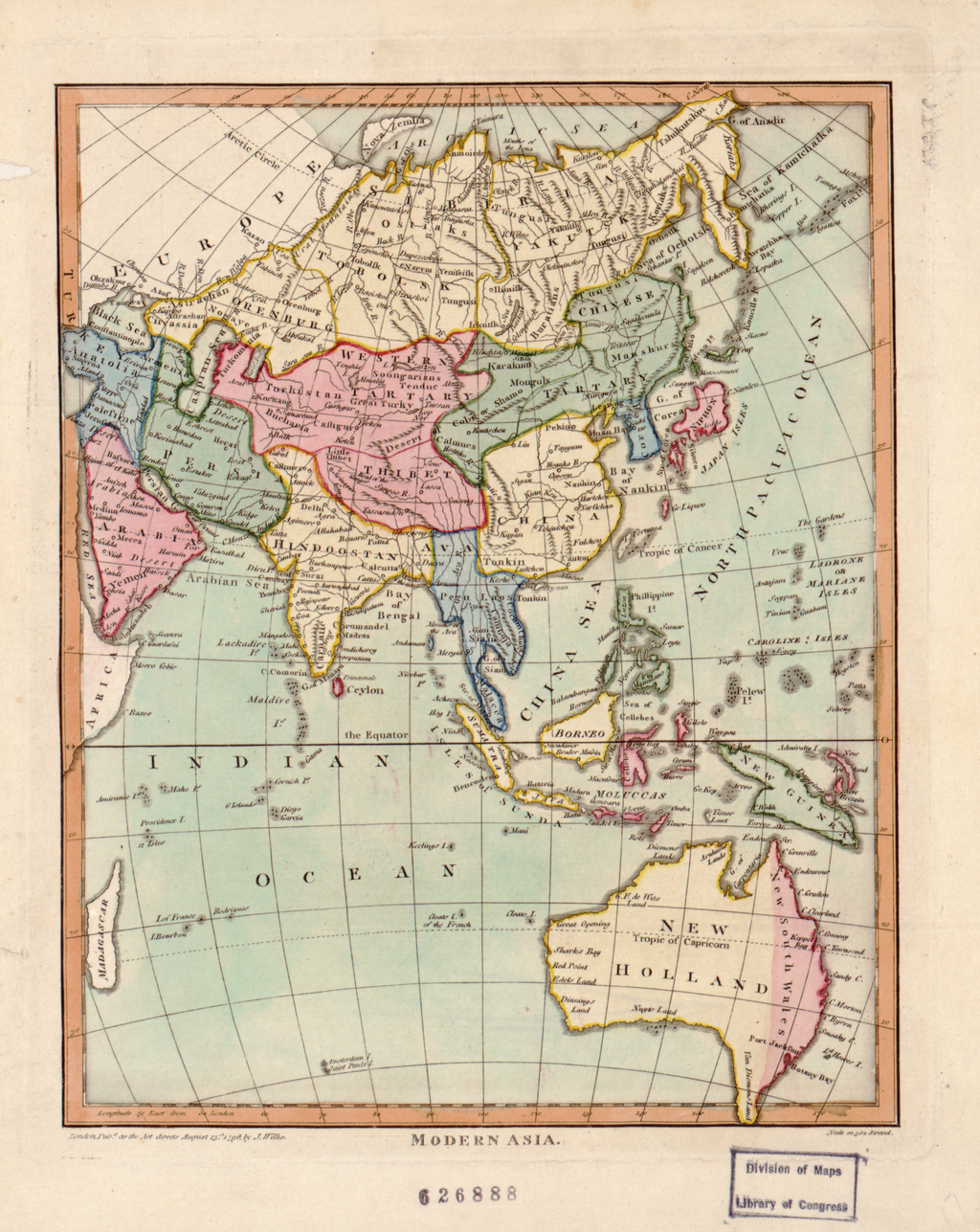
Modern Asia as created and published by John Wilkes and engraver Samuel John Neele, 1796 CE

John Wilkes (1750 – March 31, 1810) was an English printer, bookseller and stationer.

== Life ==
Wilkes was a Freeman of Winchester and proprietor of the Hampshire Chronicle. With Peter Barfoot he ran the British Directory Office in London, which published the Universal British Directory from 1790 to 1798 after obtaining a royal patent.

He "compiled, digested and arranged" the Encyclopaedia Londinensis; or, universal dictionary of arts, sciences, and literature, which was published between about 1801 and 1828 in 24 volumes, with three volumes of copperplate engravings. Some extensive articles were also published separately, viz. Horology (1811). Wilkes took on the engraver John Pass, of Pentonville, who worked on volume 13.

He owned Milland House, the "chief residence" in Milland, West Sussex. It was described later as "a remote, old-fashioned country house of antique appearance, and difficult of access, arranged in a style that would now be considered out of date. It contained a brewery, bakery, servants hall...The house was built by Peter Bettesworth in 1584, and was completely destroyed by fire November 6th, 1901. The interior contained a very fine staircase in oak, of Jacobean character, and the drawing room was fitted with some oak panelling of the same character and date."
