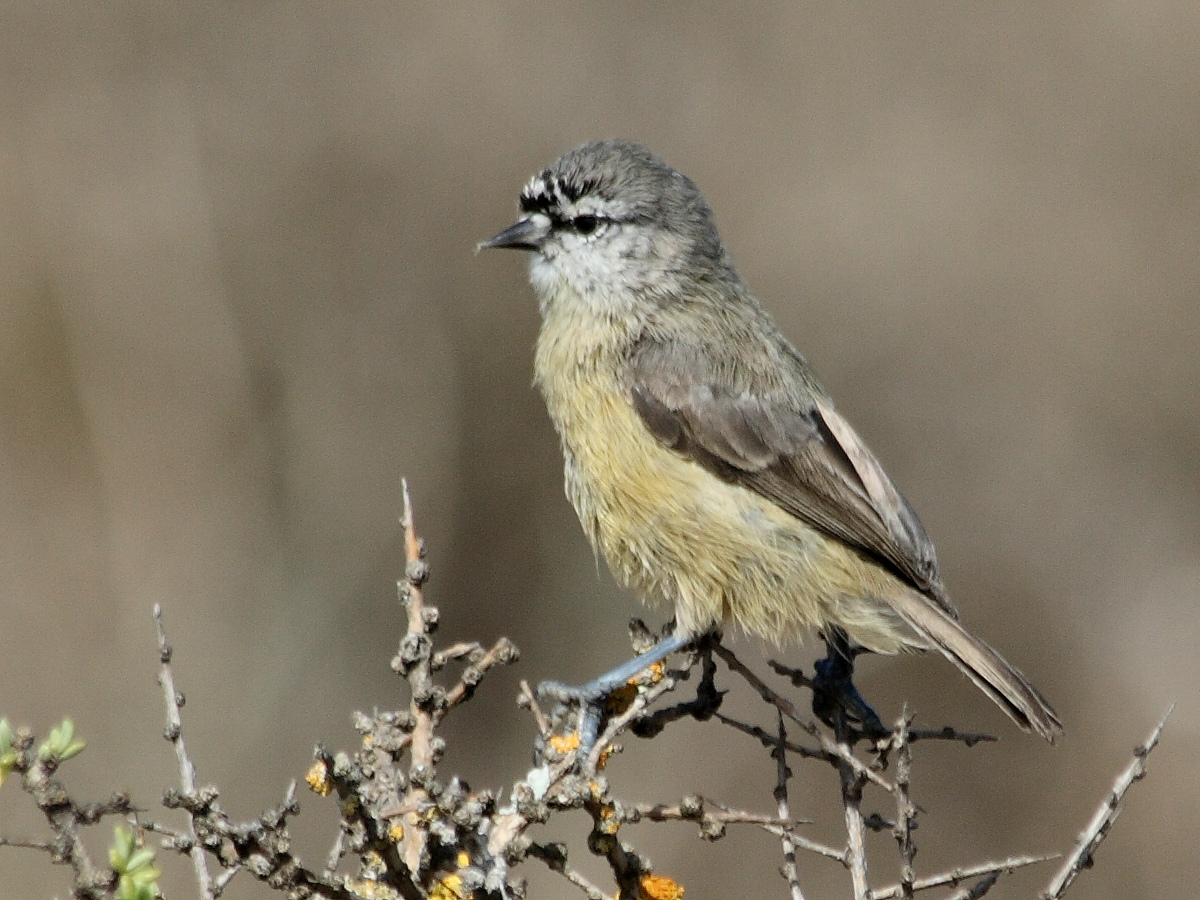

Conservation status
- Least Concern (IUCN 3.1)

Scientific classification
- Kingdom: Animalia
- Phylum: Chordata
- Class: Aves
- Order: Passeriformes
- Family: Remizidae
- Genus: Anthoscopus
- Species: A. minutus

Binomial name
- Anthoscopus minutus (Shaw, 1812)
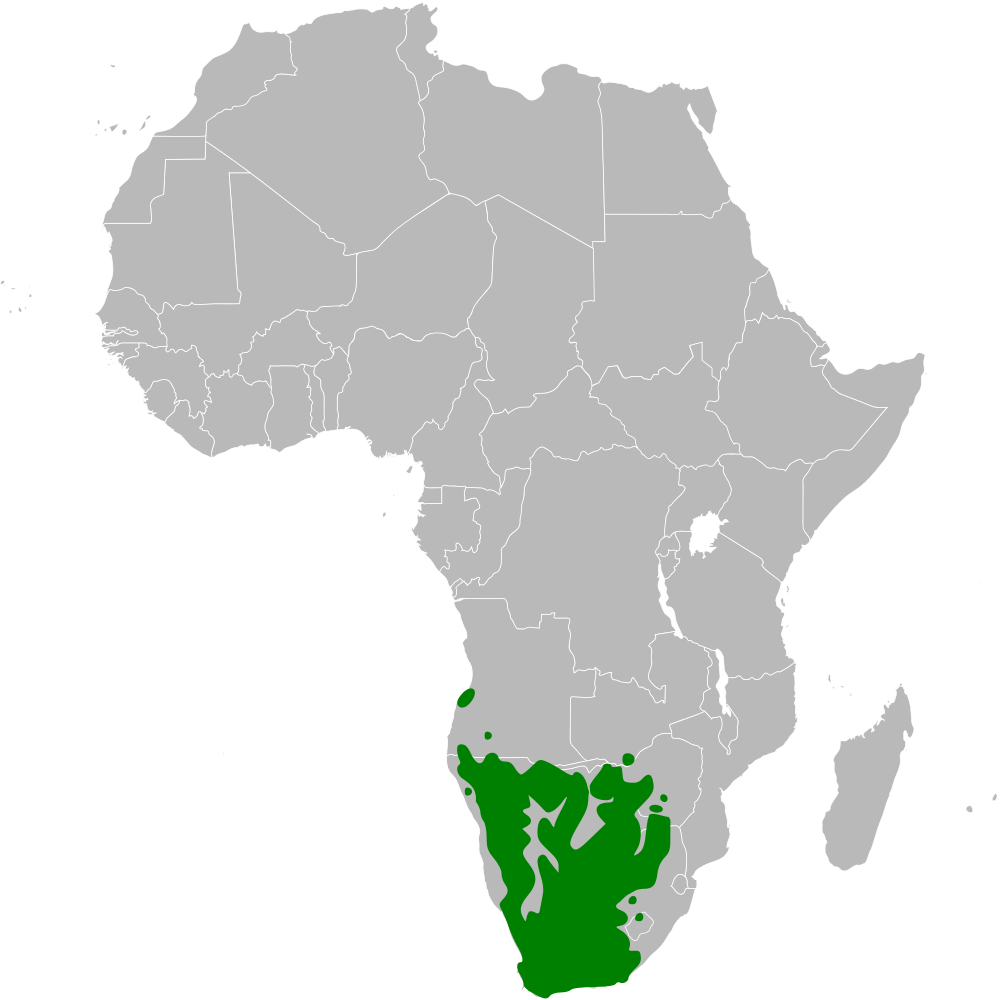

= Cape penduline tit =

Species of bird

The Cape penduline tit or southern penduline tit (Anthoscopus minutus) is a species of bird in the family Remizidae. It is found in Angola, Botswana, Namibia, South Africa, and Zimbabwe. Its natural habitats are dry savannah, subtropical or tropical dry shrubland, and Mediterranean-type shrubby vegetation. At eight centimetres (3 in) in length, it is one of the smallest species of bird found in Africa, along with its cousins the grey penduline tit and the mouse-coloured penduline tit.

== Taxonomy ==
The Cape penduline tit was formally described and illustrated in 1812 by the English naturalist George Shaw under the binomial name Sylvia minuta. The species is now placed in the genus Anthoscopus that was introduced in 1851 by the German ornithologist Jean Cabanis. The genus name combines the Ancient Greek anthos meaning "blossom" or "flower" with skopos meaning "searcher". The specific epithet minutus is Latin meaning "little".

Three subspecies are recognised:

- A. m. damarensis Reichenow, 1905 – west Angola and north Namibia, north, east Botswana, Zimbabwe and north South Africa
- A. m. gigi Winterbottom, 1959 – south South Africa
- A. m. minutus (Shaw, 1812) – west, south Namibia, southwest Botswana and west, central South Africa

== Behaviour ==
=== Breeding ===
They build a globular nest made of the webs of Stegodyphus spiders as well as silken fibre from various plants. An entrance hole is made on the side and towards the end, a false entry and chamber are constructed below the actual entrance to the nest chamber. The spout at the entrance has a separating septum with the entrance to the actual nest chamber at the upper portion, the septum pushed up with its forehead to close the upper entrance by the bird just before leaving the nest so as to show only the main entrance leading into a blind chamber. This is a defence against snakes and other nest predators.
