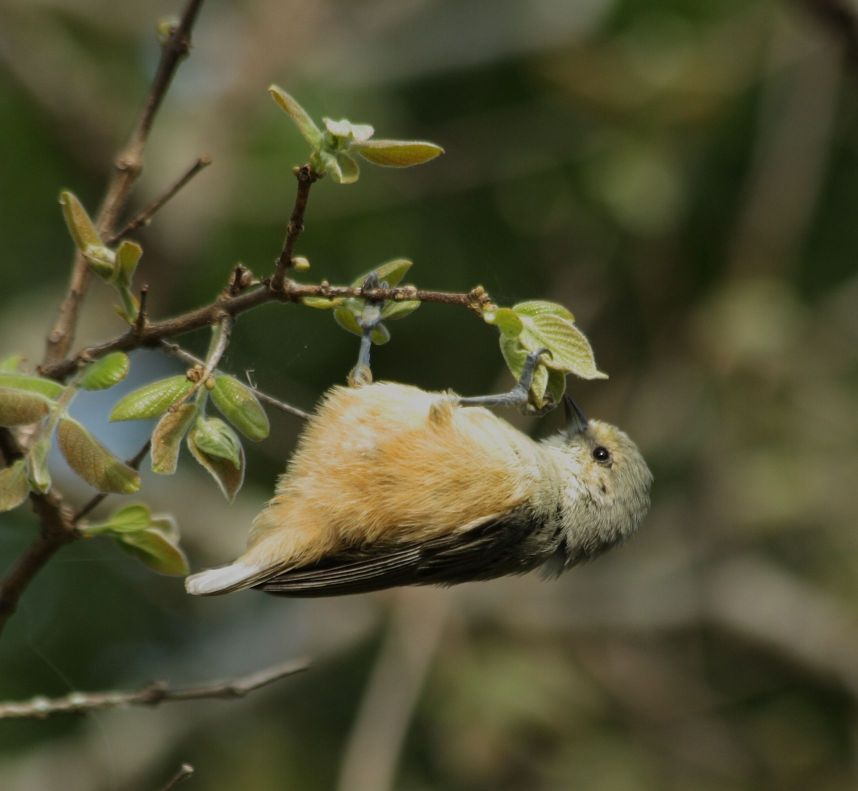

Conservation status
- Least Concern (IUCN 3.1)

Scientific classification
- Kingdom: Animalia
- Phylum: Chordata
- Class: Aves
- Order: Passeriformes
- Family: Remizidae
- Genus: Anthoscopus
- Species: A. caroli

Binomial name
- Anthoscopus caroli (Sharpe, 1871)
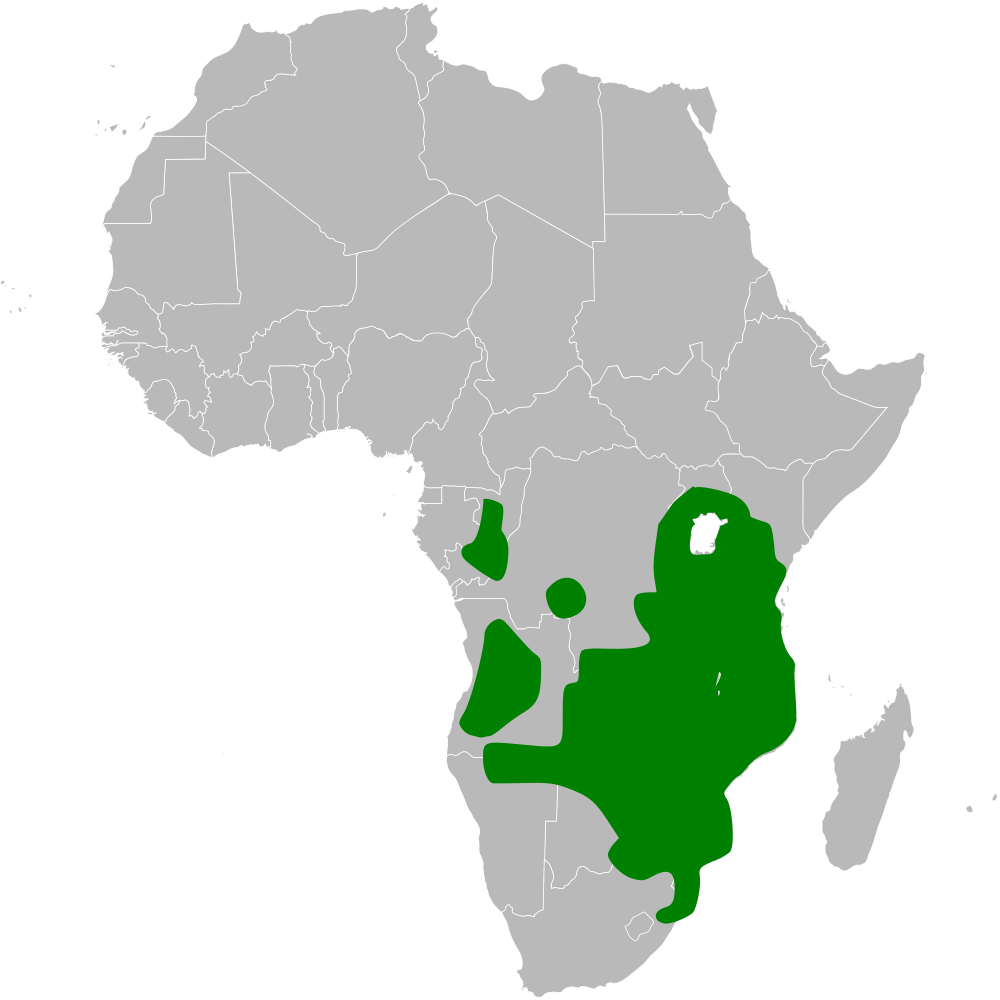

= Grey penduline tit =

Species of bird

The grey penduline tit (Anthoscopus caroli), also known as the African penduline-tit, is a species of bird in the family Remizidae. It is found in Angola, Botswana, Burundi, Republic of the Congo, Democratic Republic of the Congo, Eswatini, Kenya, Malawi, Mozambique, Namibia, Rwanda, South Africa, Tanzania, Uganda, Zambia, and Zimbabwe. Its natural habitats are subtropical or tropical dry forests, dry savanna, and moist savanna. At 8 to 9 cm (3.1 to 3.5 in) in length and a weight of 6.5 g (0.23 oz), it is one of the smallest species of bird found in Africa, along with its cousin the Cape penduline tit and the perhaps smaller mouse-colored penduline tit and the tit hylia.

== Taxonomy ==
The grey penduline tit was formally described in 1871 by the English ornithologist Richard Bowdler Sharpe from a specimen that had been collected in the Ovaquenyama or Oukwanyama district of Damaraland. This is now northern Namibia. Sharpe coined the binomial name Aegithalus caroli. This tit is now placed in the genus Anthoscopus that was introduced in 1851 by the German ornithologist Jean Cabanis. The genus name combines the Ancient Greek anthos meaning "blossom" or "flower" with skopos meaning "searcher". The specific epithet caroli is from Late Latin Carolus for "Charles". This was chosen to honour the Swedish explorer Karl Johan Andersson.

Eleven subspecies are recognised:

- A. c. roccatii Salvadori, 1906 Uganda, northeast DR Congo, Rwanda, Burundi, west Kenya and northwest Tanzania
- A. c. pallescens Ulfstrand, 1960 – west Tanzania
- A. c. ansorgei Hartert, E, 1905 – Congo, west DR Congo to central Angola
- A. c. rhodesiae Sclater, WL, 1932 – southeast DR Congo, north Zambia and southwest Tanzania
- A. c. robertsi Haagner, 1909 – southeast Kenya to ne Zambia, Malawi and north Mozambique
- A. c. caroli (Sharpe, 1871) – south Angola and southwest Zambia to north Namibia and north Botswana
- A. c. winterbottomi White, CMN, 1946 – south DR Congo and northwest Zambia
- A. c. rankinei Irwin, 1963 – northeast Zimbabwe
- A. c. hellmayri Roberts, 1914 – east, south Zimbabwe, south Mozambique and northeast South Africa
- A. c. sylviella Reichenow, 1904 – south-central Kenya to central Tanzania
- A. c. sharpei Hartert, E, 1905 – southwest Kenya to north Tanzania

The race A. c. sylviella, found in parts of Kenya and Tanzania, is sometimes regarded as a separate species, the buff-bellied penduline-tit.
