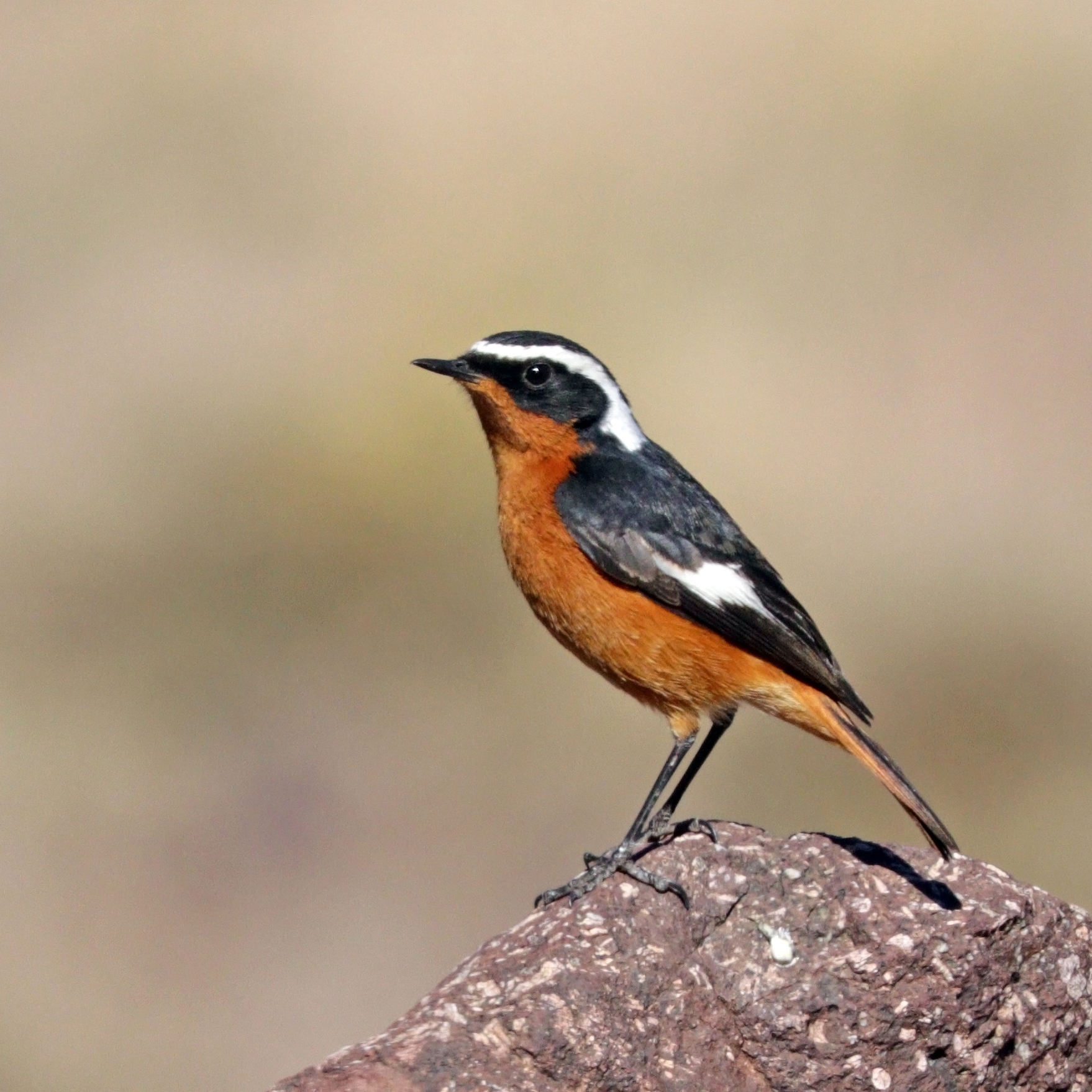
- Male, Toubkal, Morocco
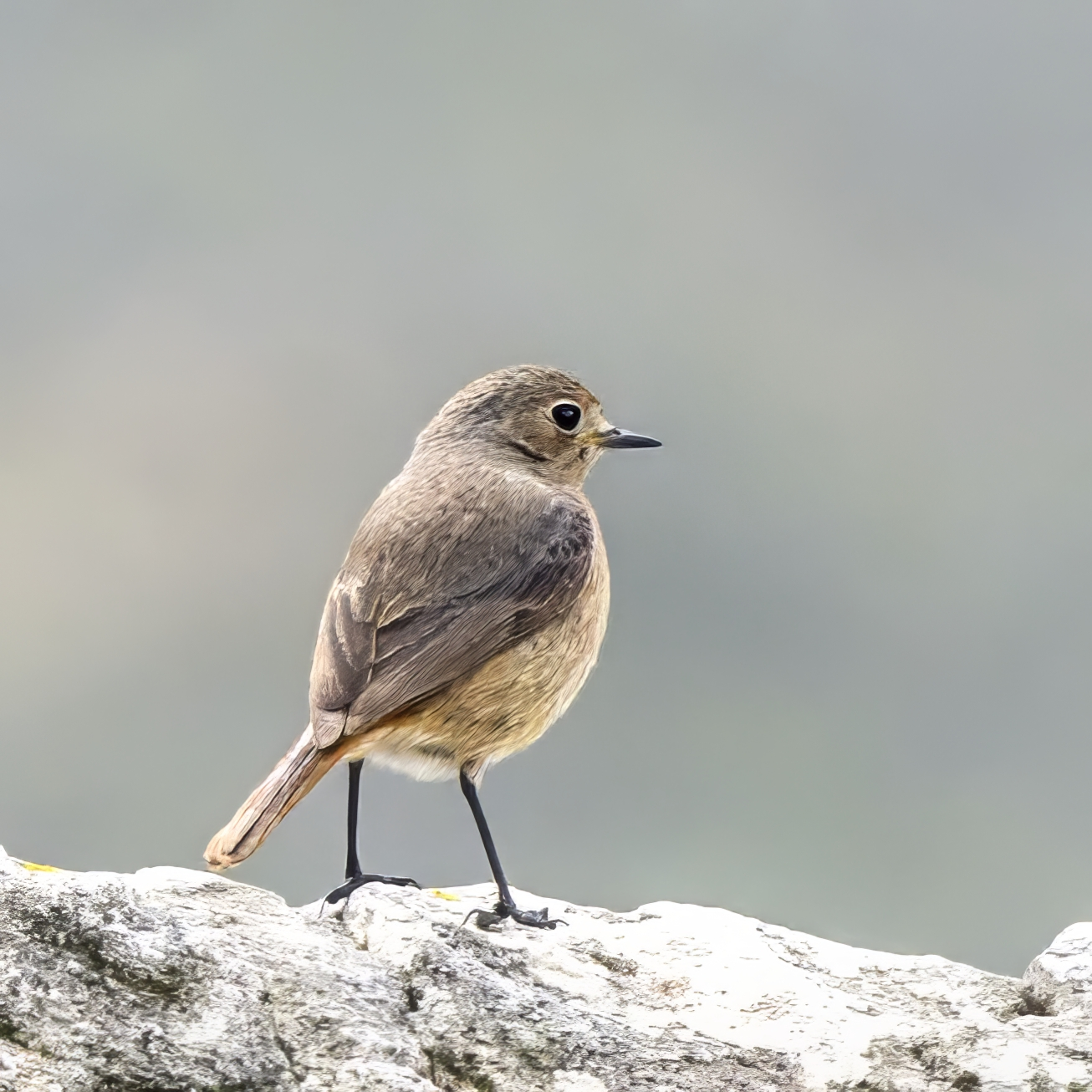
- Female, Cap Bon Peninsula, Tunisia

Conservation status
- Least Concern (IUCN 3.1)

Scientific classification
- Kingdom: Animalia
- Phylum: Chordata
- Class: Aves
- Order: Passeriformes
- Family: Muscicapidae
- Genus: Phoenicurus
- Species: P. moussieri

Binomial name
- Phoenicurus moussieri (Olphe-Galliard, 1852)

= Moussier's redstart =

Species of bird

Moussier's redstart (Phoenicurus moussieri) is a small passerine bird in the genus Phoenicurus (redstarts), formerly classed as a member of the thrush family (Turdidae), but is now classified as an Old World flycatcher (Muscicapidae). It is an endemic resident breeder in the Atlas Mountains of northwest Africa. Its habitat is open woodland in rocky areas from sea level up to 3000 m altitude in the mountains.

It is the smallest redstart, only 12 cm long and 14–15 g weight. The male has a black head with a broad white stripe running above each eye and down the side of the neck. The upperparts are black other than a white wing patch, and the rich chestnut tail, from which it and other redstarts get their names (start is an old word for tail). The underparts are a rich orange-red. The female has a pale brown head and upperparts, and the underparts are a paler orange than the male, although generally redder than the underparts of the similar but larger female common redstart.

It is named after Jean Moussier (1795–1850) who was an amateur naturalist and a surgeon in the French Army during the Napoleonic Wars.

== Behaviour ==
The male's song is a mixture of rasping sounds and svee-svee notes. The call is a plaintive single note, wheet. It is primarily insectivorous, often feeding like a flycatcher, making aerial sallies after passing insects, but also picking and even digging insects out of the ground; more rarely, it will eat small berries. Its nest is built in a bush or on the ground and the clutch is typically 3-6 eggs.

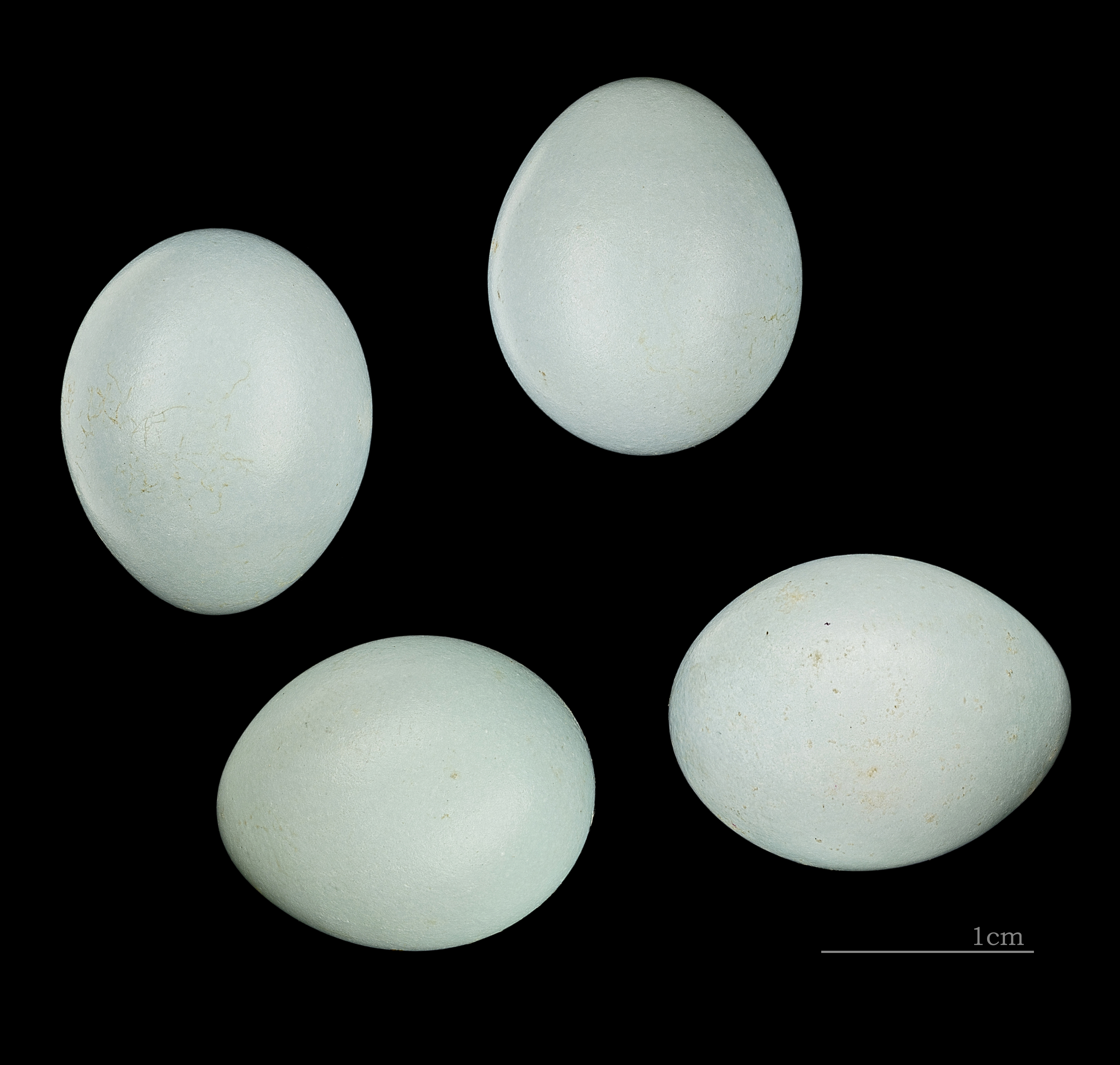
Eggs of Phoenicurus moussieri MHNT

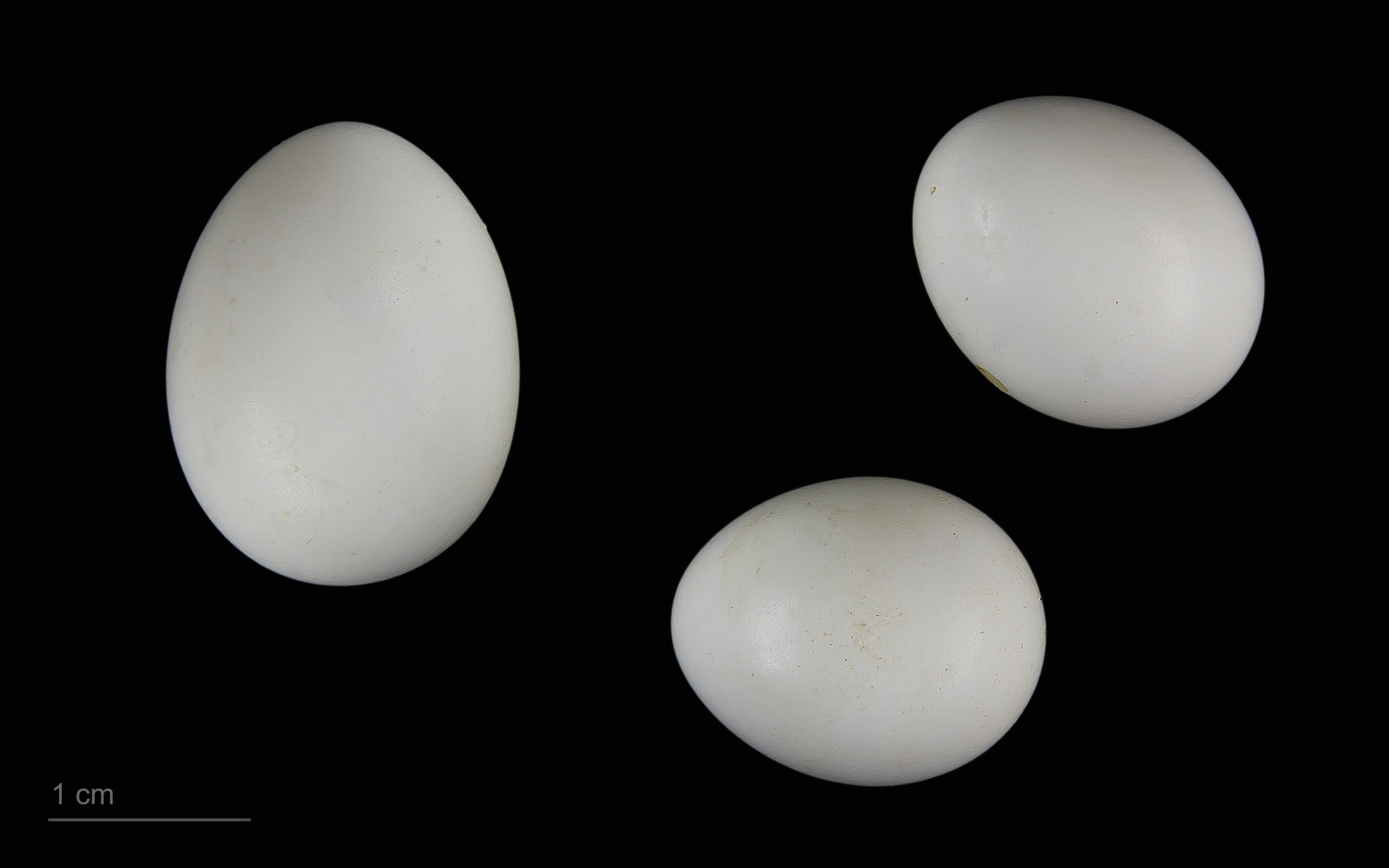
Cuculus canorus bangsi in a spawn of Phoenicurus moussieri - MHNT

Although largely resident, some show limited migratory behaviour, particularly altitudinal migration by those breeding at high altitudes moving to lower levels in winter. Vagrants have reached north to Great Britain (Dinas Head, Pembrokeshire; April 1988), east to Greece, and south to Mauritania.

== Taxonomy ==
The genus name Phoenicurus is from Ancient Greek phoinix, "red", and -ouros -"tailed". The English and specific names commemorate Jean Moussier (1795–1869) who was an amateur naturalist and a surgeon in the French Army during the Napoleonic Wars.

Its relationships are obscure; its biogeography is not matched by any other redstart, while its colour pattern is most similar to the much larger Güldenstädt's redstart, which shares the conspicuous white wing patch of the male. It was not included in the study by Ertan (2006), while in the limited sampling by Sangster et al. (2010) it was closest to common redstart.
