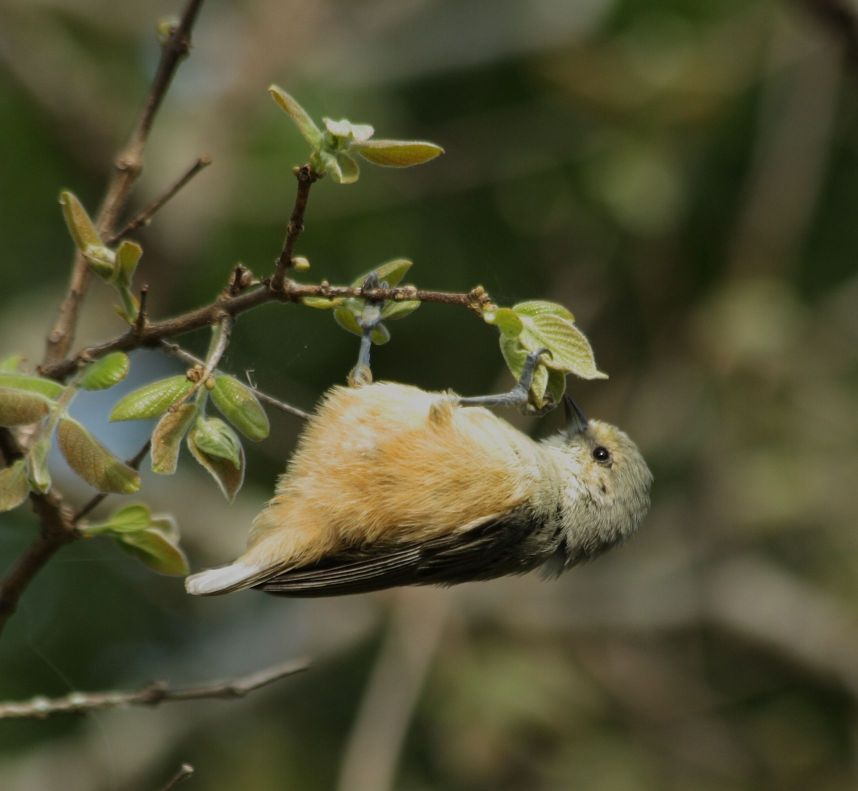
- Grey penduline tit, Anthoscopus caroli

Scientific classification
- Kingdom: Animalia
- Phylum: Chordata
- Class: Aves
- Order: Passeriformes
- Family: Remizidae
- Genus: Anthoscopus; Cabanis, 1851

Type species
- Sylvia minuta (Cape penduline tit) Shaw, 1812
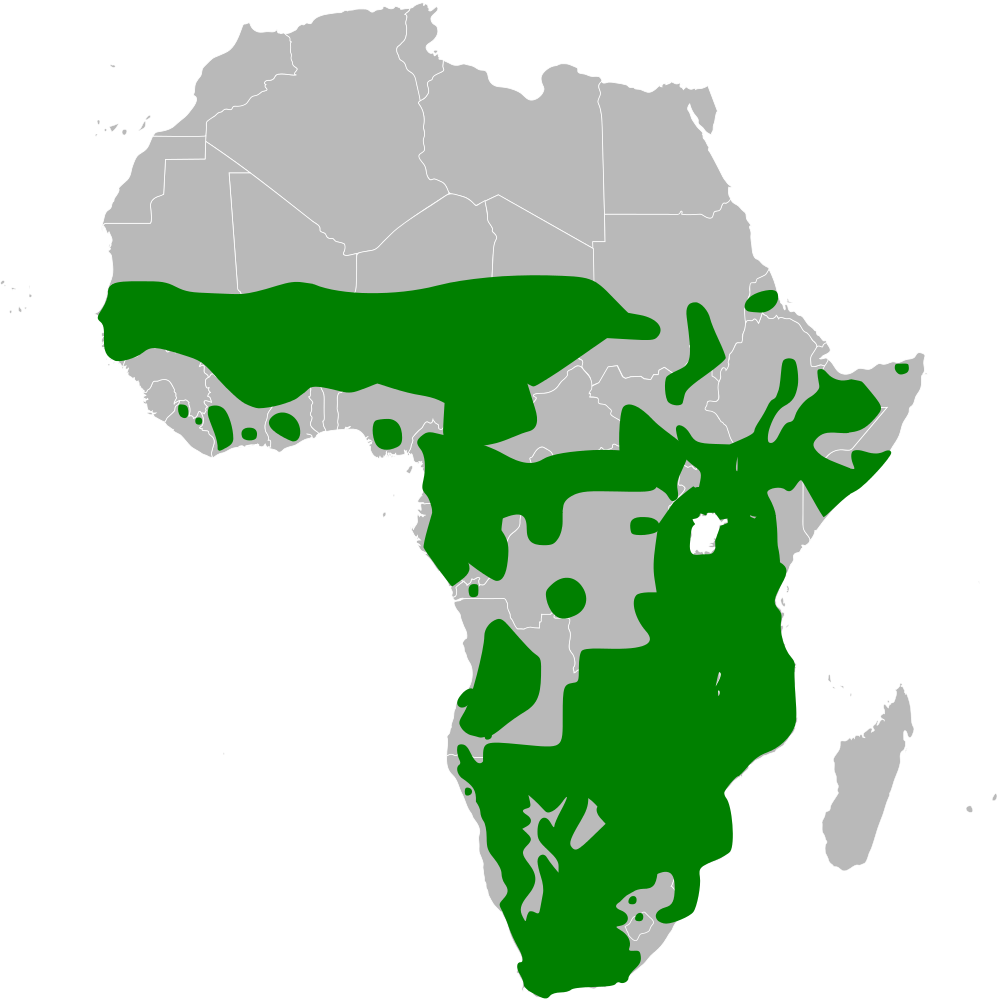

= Anthoscopus =

Genus of birds

Anthoscopus is a genus of birds in the penduline tit family Remizidae. The genus is restricted to Sub-Saharan Africa, where it ranges from the Sahel to South Africa. Unlike many of the Eurasian penduline, these species are not generally migratory, instead remaining close to their breeding sites year round. A wide range of habitats is occupied by the six species, from deserts to woodlands to rainforest.

== Nests ==
Their pendulous and elaborately woven nests have false entrances above the true entrance, these in turn lead to a false chamber. The true nesting chamber is accessed by the parent opening a hidden flap, entering and then closing the flap shut again, the two sides sealing with sticky spider webs. These false entrances are used to confuse potential predators and protect the eggs and nestlings.

== Taxonomy ==
The genus Anthoscopus was introduced in 1851 by the German ornithologist Jean Cabanis with the Cape penduline tit as the type species. The genus name combines the Ancient Greek anthos meaning "blossom" or "flower" with skopos meaning "searcher".

The genus contains the following six species:

| Image | Common name | Scientific name | Distribution |
|---|---|---|---|
| | Sennar penduline tit | Anthoscopus punctifrons | Cameroon, Chad, Eritrea, Ethiopia, Mali, Mauritania, Niger, Nigeria, Senegal, and Sudan |
| | Yellow penduline tit | Anthoscopus parvulus | Sudan (region) |
| | Mouse-colored penduline tit | Anthoscopus musculus | Ethiopia, Kenya, Somalia, South Sudan, Tanzania, and Uganda |
| | Forest penduline tit | Anthoscopus flavifrons | Cameroon, Central African Republic, Republic of the Congo, Democratic Republic of the Congo, Ivory Coast, Gabon, Ghana, Liberia, and Nigeria. |
| | Grey penduline tit (or African penduline tit) | Anthoscopus caroli | Angola, Botswana, Burundi, Republic of the Congo, Democratic Republic of the Congo, Kenya, Malawi, Mozambique, Namibia, Rwanda, South Africa, Swaziland, Tanzania, Uganda, Zambia, and Zimbabwe. |
| | Cape penduline tit (or southern penduline tit) | Anthoscopus minutus | Angola, Botswana, Namibia, South Africa, and Zimbabwe. |
