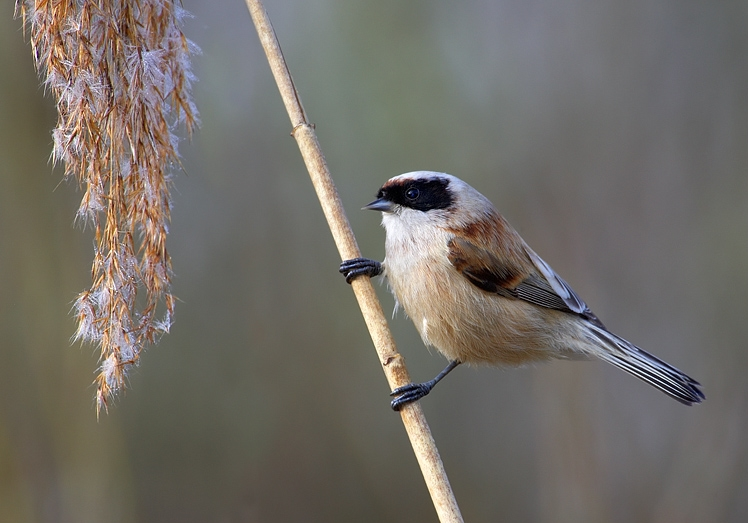
- Eurasian penduline tit (Remiz pendulinus)

Scientific classification
- Kingdom: Animalia
- Phylum: Chordata
- Class: Aves
- Order: Passeriformes
- Parvorder: Sylviida
- Family: Remizidae; Olphe-Galliard, 1891

Genera
- Remiz; Anthoscopus; Auriparus

= Penduline tit =

Penduline tits

Family of birds

The penduline tits constitute the family Remizidae, of small passerine birds related to the true tits. All but the verdin make elaborate bag nests hanging from trees (whence "penduline", hanging), usually over water.

== Characteristics ==
Penduline tits are tiny passerines, ranging from 7.5 to 11 cm in length, that resemble the true tits (Paridae) but have finer bills with more needle-like points. Their wings are short and rounded and their short tails are notched (except the stub-tailed tit). The penduline tits' typical plumage colors are pale grays and yellows and white, though the European penduline tit has black and chestnut markings and some species have bright yellow or red.

== Distribution and habitat ==
The penduline tits live in Eurasia and Africa and North America. The genus Remiz is almost exclusively Palearctic, ranging discontinuously from Portugal and the tip of northern Morocco through to Siberia and Japan. The largest genus, Anthoscopus, is found in sub-Saharan Africa from the Sahel through to South Africa. The verdin lives in arid parts of the southwestern U.S. and northern Mexico.

Several species of penduline tit are migratory, although this behaviour is only shown in species found in Asia and Europe; African species and the verdin are apparently sedentary. The Eurasian penduline tit is migratory over parts of its range, with birds in northern Europe moving south in the winter but birds in southern Europe remaining close to their breeding areas. In contrast the Chinese penduline tit is fully migratory and undertakes long-distance migrations.

Most live in open country with trees or bushes, ranging from desert to marsh to woodland, but the forest penduline tit lives in rain forest. They spend most of the year in small flocks.

== Behaviour ==
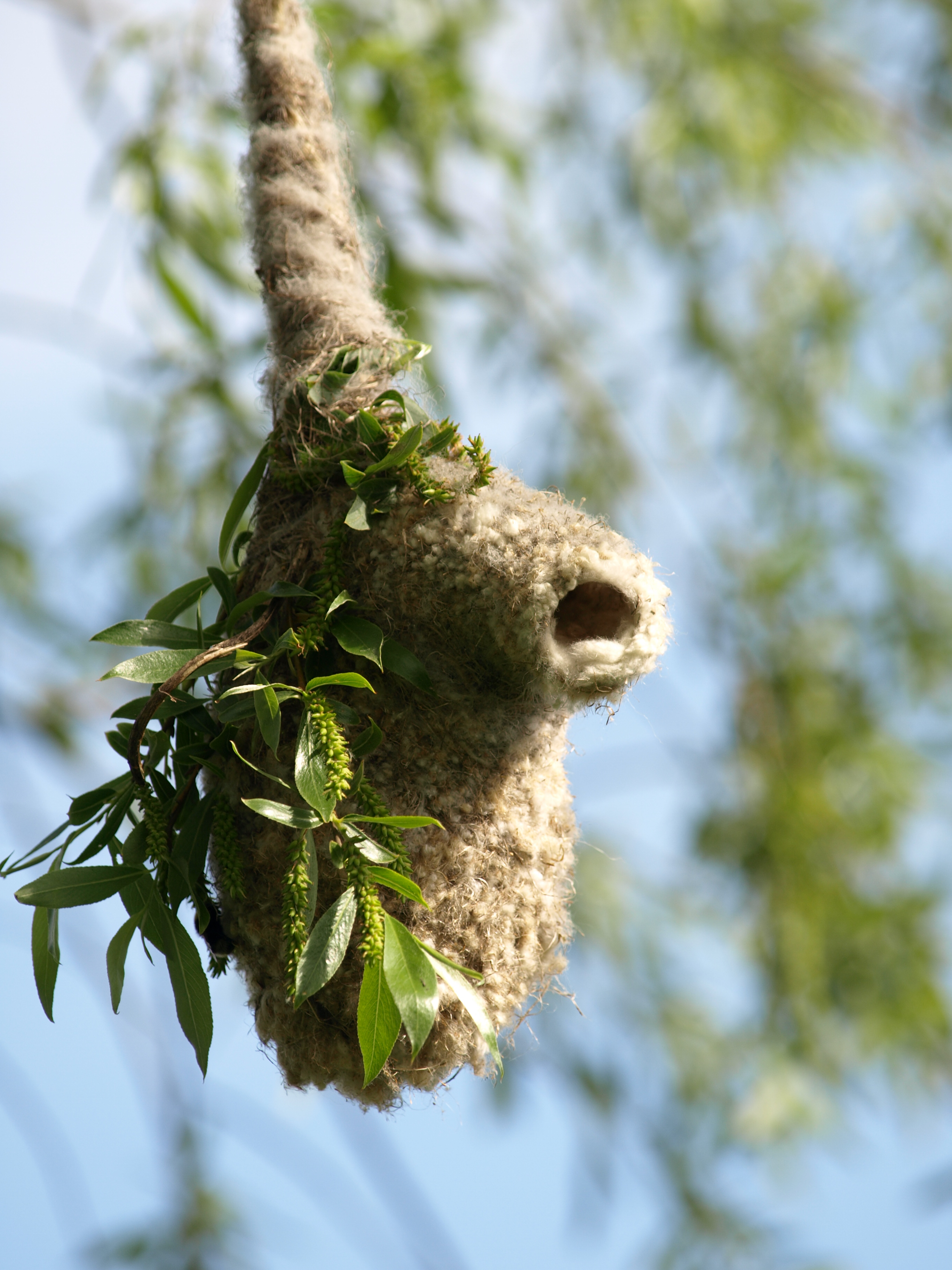
Eurasian penduline tit nest in Poland

Insects form the larger part of the diet of the penduline tits, and they are active foragers. Their long conical bill is used to probe into cracks and prise open holes in order to obtain prey. Nectar, seeds and fruits may also be taken seasonally. Their foraging behaviour is reminiscent of the true tits (Paridae), foraging upside-down on small branches, manoeuvring branches and leaves with their feet in order to inspect them, and clasping large prey items with one foot while dismembering them.

The common name of the family reflects the tendency of most species to construct elaborate pear-shaped nests. These nests are woven from spiderweb, wool and animal hair and soft plant materials, which are suspended from twigs and branches in trees. The nests of the African genus Anthoscopus are even more elaborate than the Eurasian Remiz, incorporating a false entrance above the true entrance which leads to a false chamber. The true nesting chamber is accessed by the parent opening a hidden flap, entering and then closing the flap shut again, the two sides sealing with sticky spider webs.

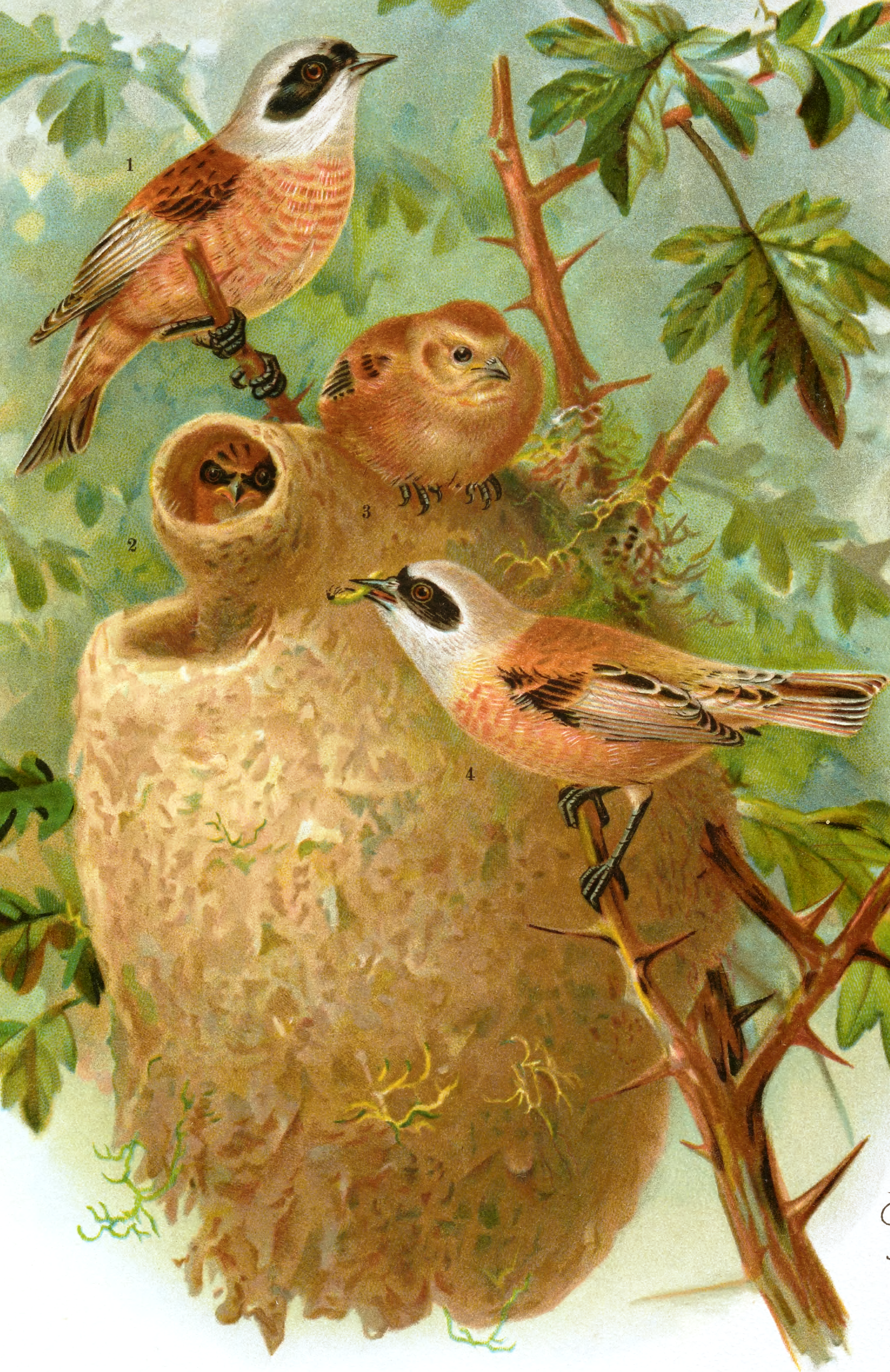
Nest of Eurasian penduline tit (Remiz pendulinus) (University of Hamburg)

The verdin builds a domed nest out of thorny twigs. In some penduline tit species the eggs are white, sometimes with red spots. The verdin lays blue-green eggs with red spots. Incubation lasts about 13 or 14 days, and the nestlings fledge at about 18 days. In penduline tits, higher incidents of extra-pair paternity results in lower rates of male care, suggesting that extra-pair offspring devalues parental care.

== Systematics ==
The family Remizidae was introduced in 1891 (as Remizeae) by the French ornithologist Léon Olphe-Galliard. Sometimes, these birds are included as subfamily Remizinae in the tit family Paridae. Which taxonomic lineup scientists prefers is primarily a matter of taste; that these families are close relatives is well established by now. If they are considered a separate family, the sultan tit and the yellow-browed tit would possibly need to be excluded from the Paridae. The placement of the tit-hylia within this family is particularly controversial, it having variously been placed with the sunbirds, waxbills, honeyeaters and most recently close to the green hylia. It is placed in the family Cettiidae.

The family contains 11 species in 3 genera:

Image	Genus	Living species
	Remiz Jarocki, 1819	Eurasian penduline tit (Remiz pendulinus); Black-headed penduline tit (Remiz macronyx); Chinese penduline tit (Remiz consobrinus); White-crowned penduline tit (Remiz coronatus)
	Anthoscopus Cabanis, 1850	Grey penduline tit (Anthoscopus caroli); Forest penduline tit (Anthoscopus flavifrons); Cape penduline tit (Anthoscopus minutus); Mouse-colored penduline tit (Anthoscopus musculus); Yellow penduline tit (Anthoscopus parvulus); Sennar penduline tit (Anthoscopus punctifrons)
	Auriparus S.F. Baird, 1864	Verdin (Auriparus flaviceps)
