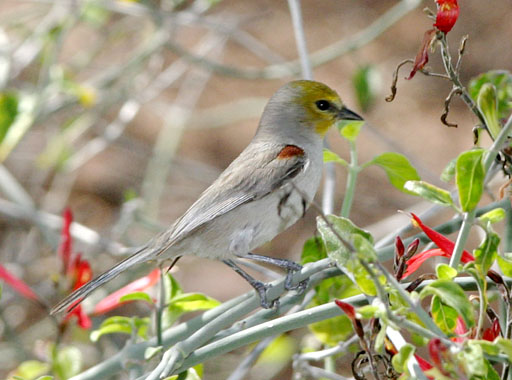

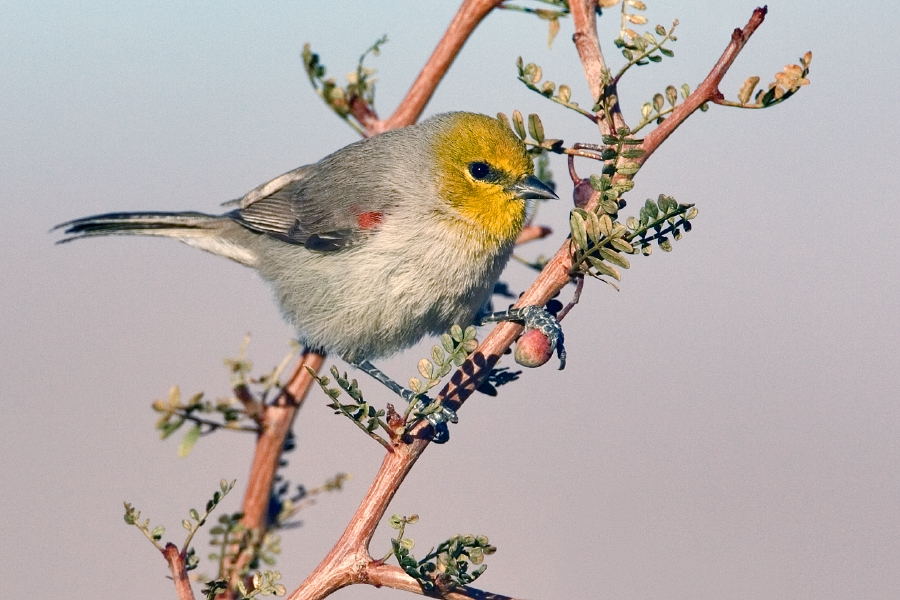

Conservation status
- Least Concern (IUCN 3.1)

Scientific classification
- Kingdom: Animalia
- Phylum: Chordata
- Class: Aves
- Order: Passeriformes
- Family: Remizidae
- Genus: Auriparus; S.F. Baird, 1864
- Species: A. flaviceps

Binomial name
- Auriparus flaviceps (Sundevall, 1850)
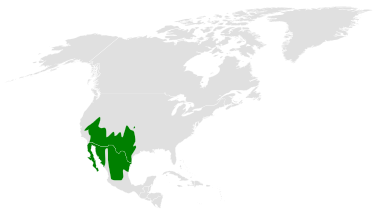

= Verdin =

Genus of birds

The verdin (Auriparus flaviceps) is a species of penduline tit. It is the only species in the genus Auriparus and the only representative of the Old World family Remizidae to be found in North America.

== Taxonomy ==
The verdin was formally described in 1850 by the Swedish zoologist Carl Jakob Sundevall under the binomial name Aegithalus flaviceps. It is now the only species placed in the genus Auriparus that was introduced in 1864 by the American naturalist Spencer Fullerton Baird. The genus name combines the Latin aurum, auri meaning "gold" with the genus name Parus that was introduced by Carl Linnaeus in 1758 for the tits. The specific epithet flaviceps combines the Latin flavis meaning "yellow" with -ceps meaning "-capped".

Six subspecies are recognised:

- A. f. acaciarum Grinnell, 1931 – southwest USA to north Baja California, central Sonora, central Chihuahua and central Durango (northwest Mexico)
- A. f. ornatus (Lawrence, 1851) – south-central USA and northeast Mexico
- A. f. flaviceps (Sundevall, 1850) – central Baja California, south Sonora and north Sinaloa (northwest Mexico)
- A. f. lamprocephalus Oberholser, 1897 – south Baja California (northwest Mexico)
- A. f. sinaloae Phillips, AR, 1986 – northwest Sinaloa (northwest Mexico)
- A. f. hidalgensis Phillips, AR, 1986 – north-central Mexico

== Description ==
The verdin is a very small bird. At 4.5 in (11 cm) in length, it rivals the American bushtit as one of the smallest passerines in North America. It is gray overall, and adults have a bright yellow head and rufous shoulder patch (the lesser coverts). Unlike the tits, it has a sharply pointed bill. Juveniles have a light gray body without the rufous shoulder patch and yellow head. The base of the short bill is thick by the head, and draws to a sharp point at the tip.

=== Vocalizations ===
Little is known about geographic or individual variation in vocalizations. Verdins produce a variety of calls, loud for their size. The typical call note is a repetitive "tschep" sound repeated in rapid staccato. In Texas, rapid "chip-chip-chip" calls have been observed, all at the same pitch and at the same speed in each call series. The day of hatching, nestlings can produce short peep notes, faint and high-pitched. Fledglings, during their post-juvenile molt, can make soft warbling notes, similar to more complex signatures of adult calls. The verdin gives rapid "tschep" calls frequently while foraging. Unmated males sound "tseet" calls repeatedly in early spring, which may function to attract females. "Tseet" calls are also given by either sex of a mated pair, by solitary foraging birds, and by older nestlings. This may be used as an identifier call to help keep members of the breeding pair together as they move through brush to forage. "Tweedle" warbling calls may reinforce a breeding pair bond. The verdin also gives a "gee-gee-gee-gee" alarm call in response to predators or when captured.

== Distribution and habitat ==
Two subspecies nest in the United States. The subspecies A. f. acaciarum is resident from southern California, Nevada, and Utah southward into Mexico; it is associated mostly with the Sonoran Desert. The subspecies A. f. ornatus is found from New Mexico and Oklahoma southward into Mexico and is associated with the Chihuahuan Desert and its scrublands. The remaining 4-5 subspecies are resident to Mexico, and aren't known to migrate into the United States. Verdins nest in shrubs and thorny thickets with few trees. Their nests are best described as spherical masses of bulky twigs and branches that are then lined with grasses, feathers, and hair. The entrance to the nest is about 1" in diameter, and is usually at the bottom of the sphere. They feed in shrub-land and scrubby outcrops where insects are hosted and berries and seeds are plentiful.

== Behavior and ecology ==
=== Breeding ===
Verdins nest in the spring and tend to form monogamous pairs, but do not stay together year-round. Otherwise, they are usually solitary. Both males and females build nests for roosting and nesting, and both incubate the eggs and tend to young. Clutch sizes vary from 3-6 eggs, which are light green with irregular dark red-brown spots, concentrated at the bottom end of the egg. No formal courtship display is known for the species, but males sing more frequently during breeding and sometimes also build a "display nest" of sorts. This display nest may help to display partner suitability, but this correlation has not been confirmed. Once paired, the male and female claim a territory (as large as 20 acres) and will defend the boundary starting early in the breeding season through fledging. After fledging, the young forage with both parents until winter, and then disperse short distances from their hatching site.

=== Food and feeding ===
Verdins are insectivorous, continuously foraging among the desert trees and scrubs. Verdins occasionally try to obtain sugar water from hummingbird feeders. They feed on many kinds of tiny insects, both adults and larvae, and also consume hard and soft mast of many trees and shrubs.

== Conservation status ==
Although the verdin is listed as a species of least concern [LC] by the IUCN, The North American Breeding Bird Survey suggests that verdin populations have declined by 1.9% per year between 1968 and 2015. This decline could mean that the species has experienced a cumulative decrease of 60% in that 47-year period. Threats to verdin populations include habitat loss as a result of urbanization, human structure collisions, and predation.
