= Léon Olphe-Galliard =

French ornithologist (1825–1893)

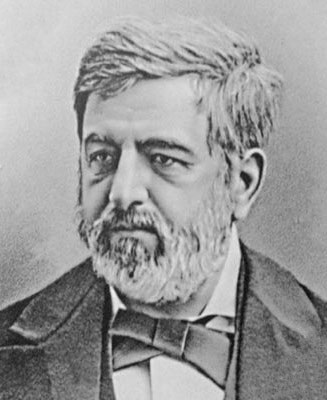
Léon Olphe-Galliard

Victor-Aimé-Léon Olphe-Galliard (27 October 1825, in Lyon – 2 February 1893, in Hendaye, Basses Pyrénées) was a French ornithologist.

Following his studies at the École Royale in Lyon, Olphe-Galliard planned to study medicine, but following the Revolution of 1848 he abandoned this plan and took refuge in Switzerland with his family. Here he was devoted entirely to ornithology and publishing his first work in " Naumannia" and the Journal für Ornithologie of Jean Cabanis. In 1856 he took part in the second congress of Deutsche Ornithologen-Gesellschaft at Gothen in Germany, where he met Prince Lucien Bonaparte, and other scientists. In 1864 he returned to Lyon. In 1870 he left this city again and went to live in Bulle. He returned to France in 1876, lived for a time at Angoulême and then after 1880 in Hendaye. He died on February 2, 1893, after a long illness, bequeathing his collections and his manuscripts to the town of Gap.

Olphe-Galliard was a member of Academy of Lyon, of the Société Linnéenne and of the Société Helvétique. He published thirty-six papers on the ornithological fauna of Western Europe between 1884 and 1890, and in 1891, Catalogue of the birds around Lyon. This gives descriptions, synonyms and the bibliography of all the species of the south-west of Europe as well as of species which, although not living in this area, could be confused with the local species. His tendency not to comply with the principle of priority formulated in 1842 earned some reproaches from American ornithologists, but they noted his knowledge of foreign languages rare among French ornithologists.

Olphe-Galliard described Moussier's redstart in 1852.
