= Forest penduline tit =

Conservation status
- Least Concern (IUCN 3.1)

Scientific classification
- Kingdom: Animalia
- Phylum: Chordata
- Class: Aves
- Order: Passeriformes
- Family: Remizidae
- Genus: Anthoscopus
- Species: A. flavifrons

Binomial name
- Anthoscopus flavifrons (Cassin, 1855)
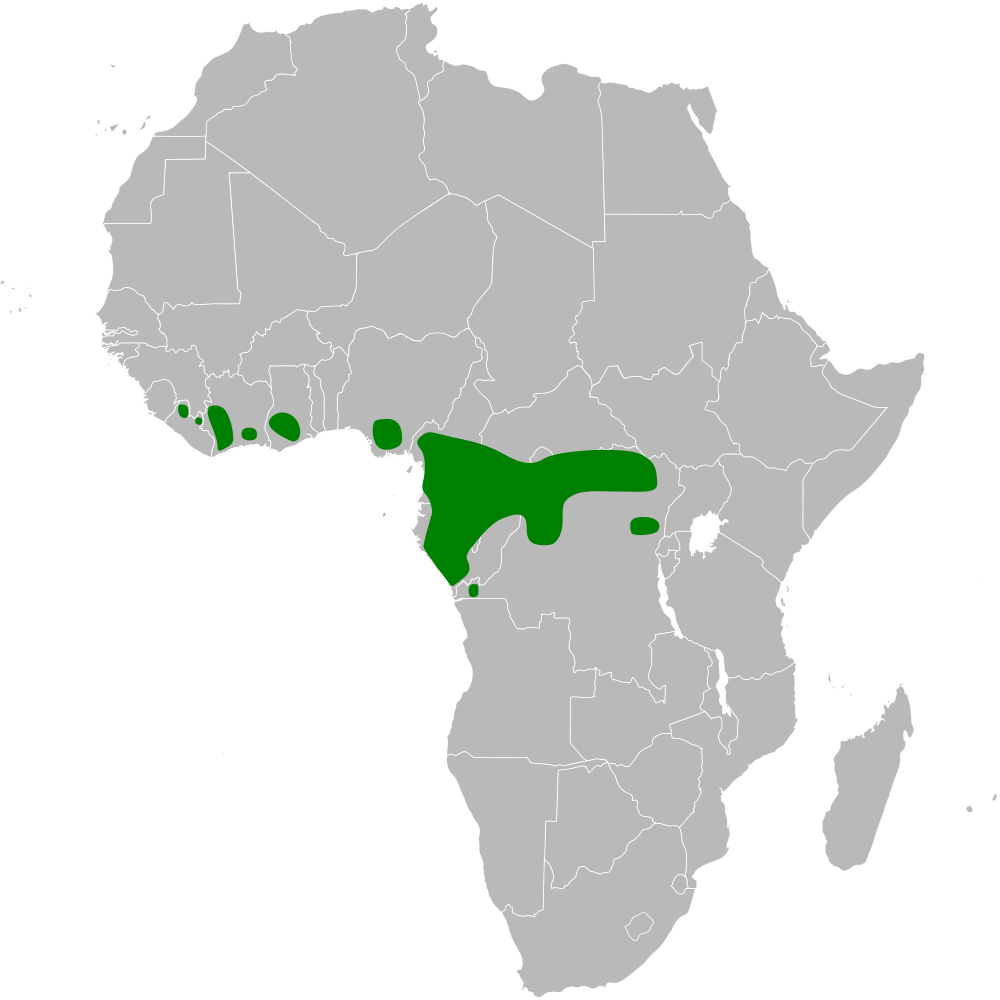

Species of bird

The forest penduline tit (Anthoscopus flavifrons) is a species of bird in the family Remizidae. It is native to the African tropical rainforest.
