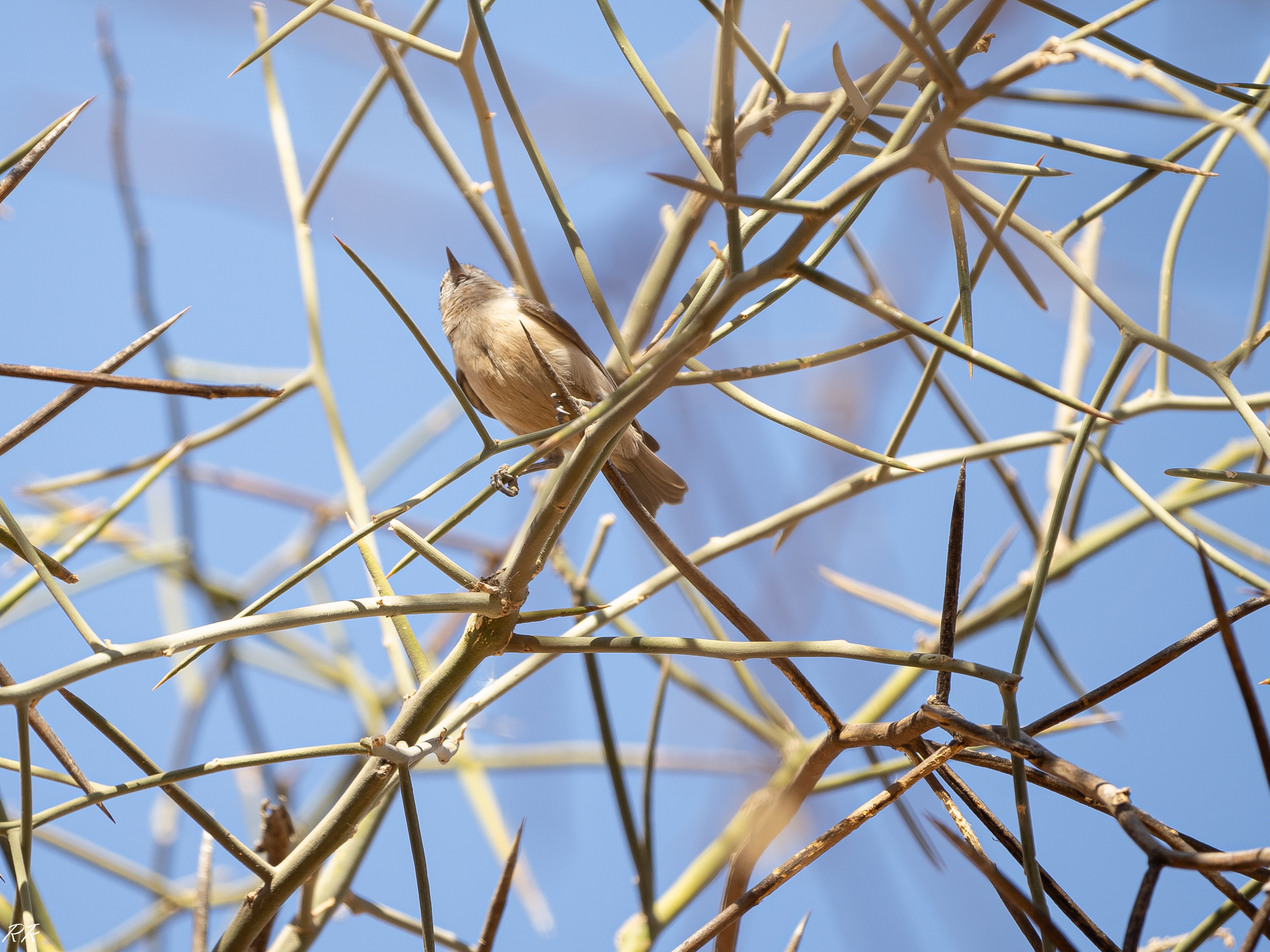

Conservation status
- Least Concern (IUCN 3.1)

Scientific classification
- Kingdom: Animalia
- Phylum: Chordata
- Class: Aves
- Order: Passeriformes
- Family: Remizidae
- Genus: Anthoscopus
- Species: A. punctifrons

Binomial name
- Anthoscopus punctifrons (Sundevall, 1850)
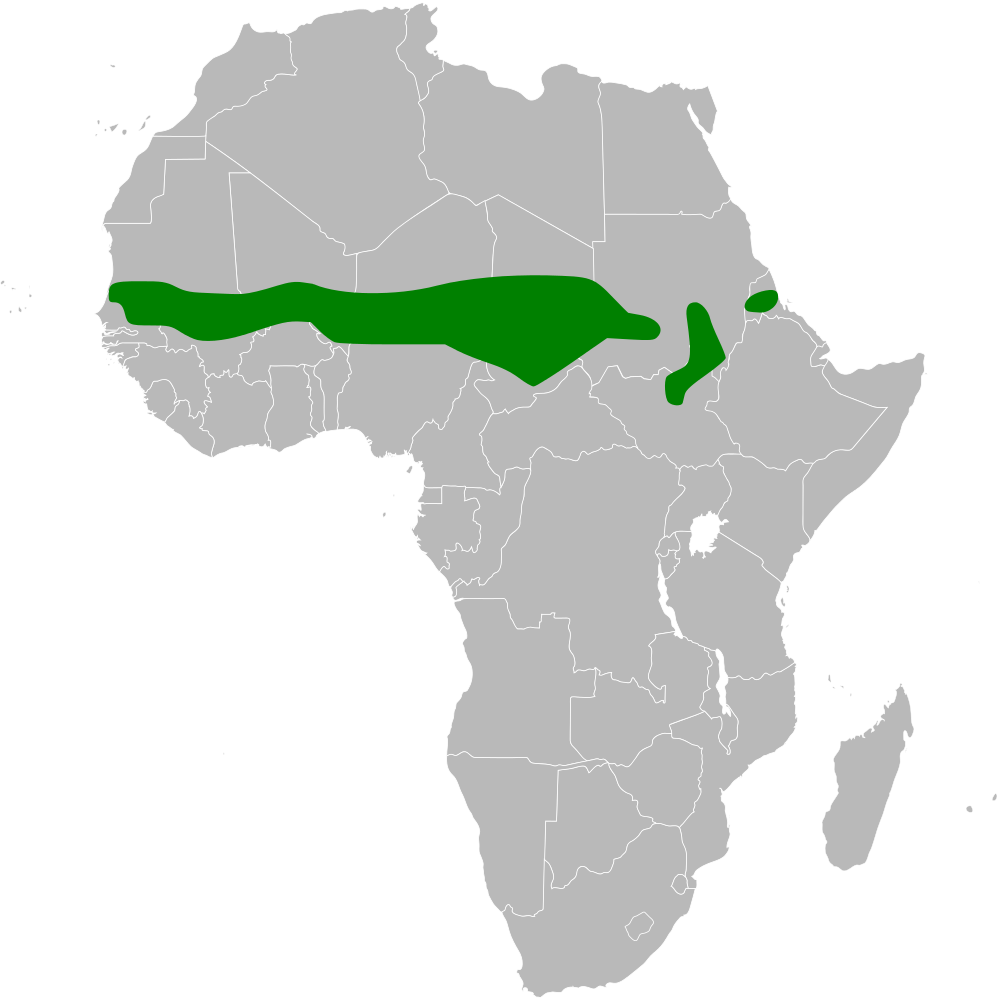

= Sennar penduline tit =

Species of bird

The Sennar penduline tit (Anthoscopus punctifrons) is a species of bird in the family Remizidae, the most northerly member of the genus Anthoscopus. It is found in Cameroon, Chad, Eritrea, Ethiopia, Mali, Mauritania, Niger, Nigeria, Senegal, and Sudan. Its natural habitats are dry savanna and subtropical or tropical dry shrubland.
