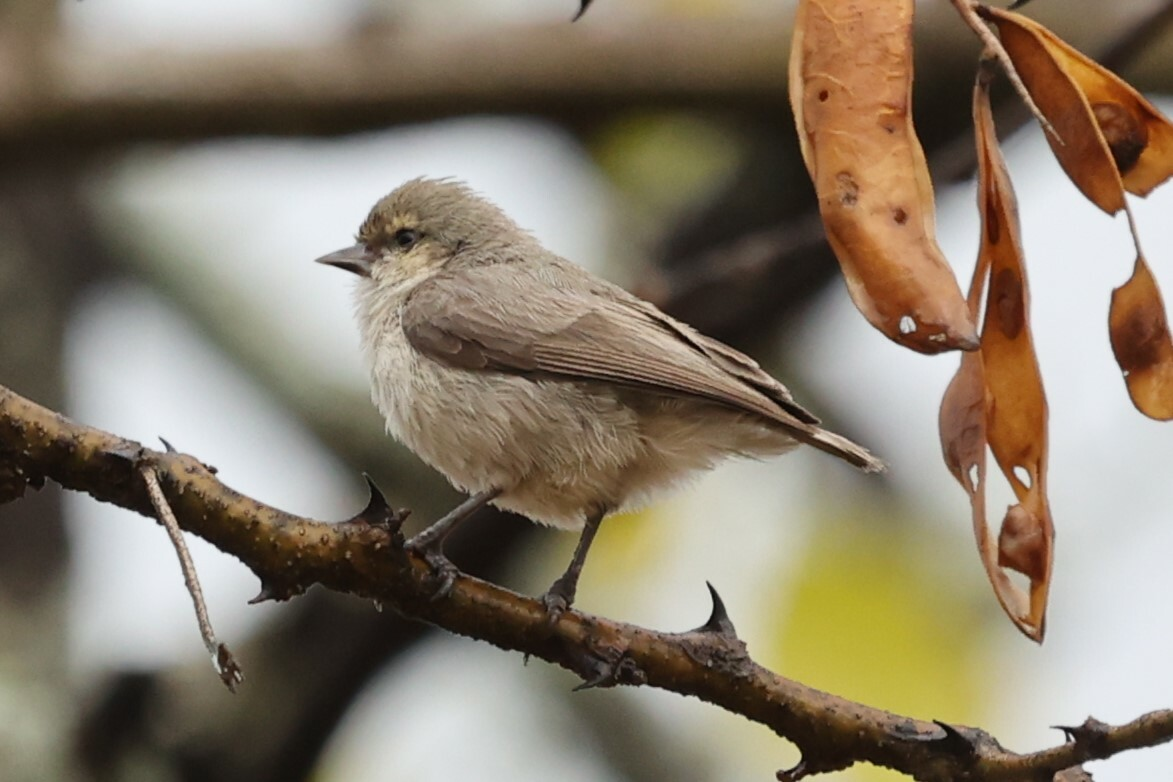

Conservation status
- Least Concern (IUCN 3.1)

Scientific classification
- Kingdom: Animalia
- Phylum: Chordata
- Class: Aves
- Order: Passeriformes
- Family: Remizidae
- Genus: Anthoscopus
- Species: A. musculus

Binomial name
- Anthoscopus musculus (Hartlaub, 1882)
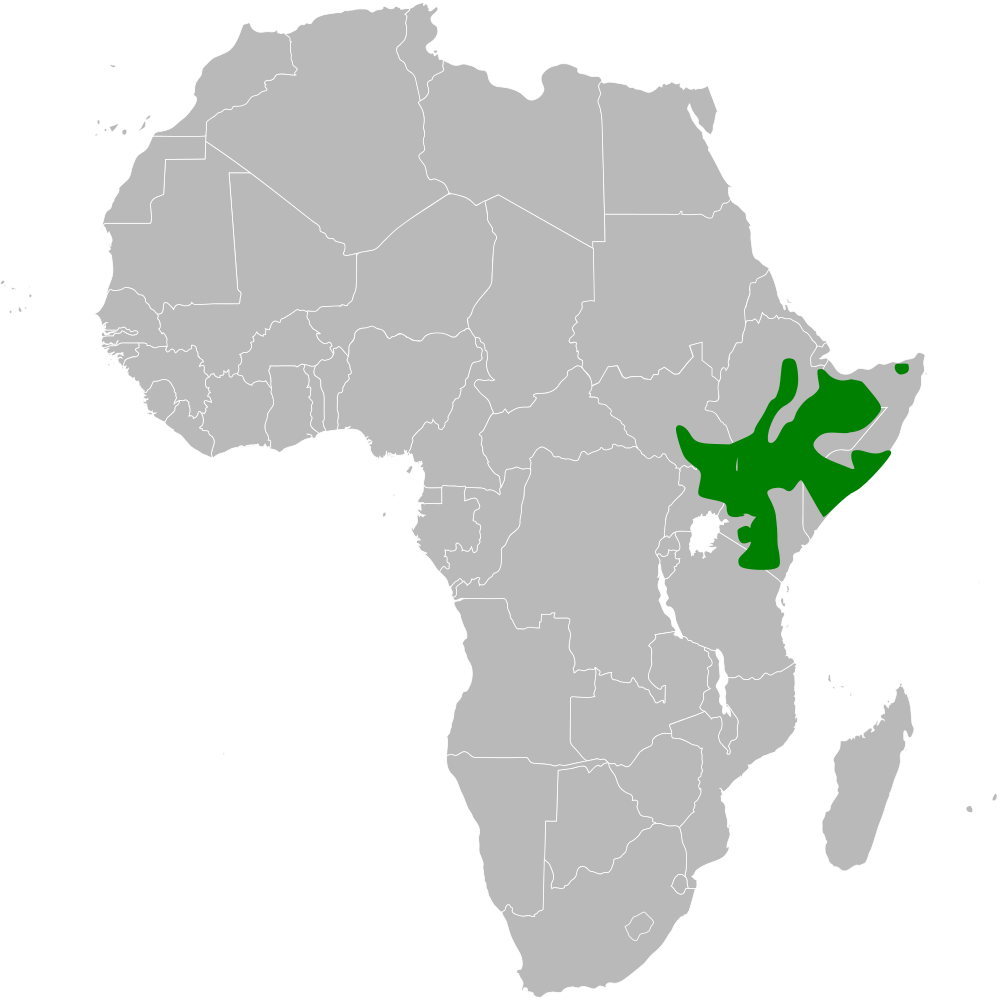

= Mouse-coloured penduline tit =

Species of bird

The mouse-coloured penduline tit or mouse-colored penduline tit (Anthoscopus musculus) is a species of bird in the family Remizidae. At 8 cm (3.1 in) in length, it is one of the two shortest birds native to Africa, alongside the tit hylia.

== Taxonomy ==
The mouse-coloured penduline tit was formally described in 1882 by the German ornithologist Gustav Hartlaub under the binomial name Aegithalus musculus. The species is now placed in the genus Anthoscopus that was introduced in 1851 by the German ornithologist Jean Cabanis. The genus name combines the Ancient Greek anthos meaning "blossom" or "flower" with skopos meaning "searcher". The specific epithet musculus is Latin meaning "little mouse". The species is considered to be monotypic: no subspecies are recognised.

== Distribution and habitat ==
This species has an extensive range in Ethiopia, Kenya, Somalia, South Sudan, Tanzania, and Uganda, with an estimated global Extent of Occurrence of 550,000 km^{2}. Its natural habitats are dry savannah and subtropical or tropical dry shrubland.
