= Totanus =

Genus of birds

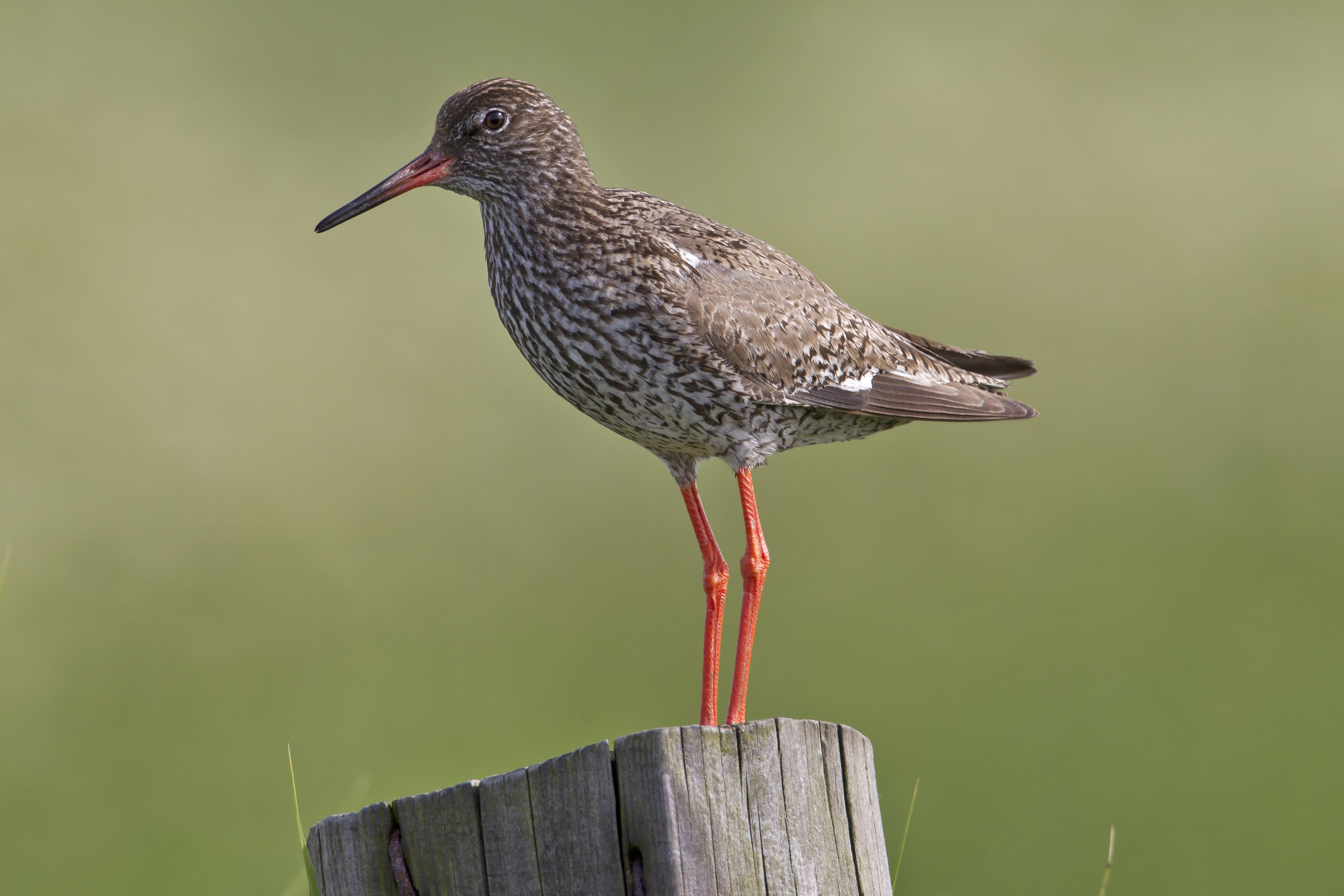
Common redshank (Tringa totanus)

Totanus (Bechstein, 1803) is a generic name previously applied to various waders or shorebirds, now subsumed within Tringa. Created by Johann Matthäus Bechstein, it derives from the species name for the common redshank, described by Carl Linnaeus in his landmark 1758 10th edition of Systema Naturae as Scolopax totanus, from totano, the Italian name for the bird.

Birds once placed in the genus include:

- Common redshank (Totanus totanus), now Tringa totanus
- Greater yellowlegs (Totanus melanoleucus), now Tringa melanoleuca
- Lesser yellowlegs (Totanus flavipes), now Tringa flavipes
- Willet (Totanus semipalmatus), now Tringa semipalmata
