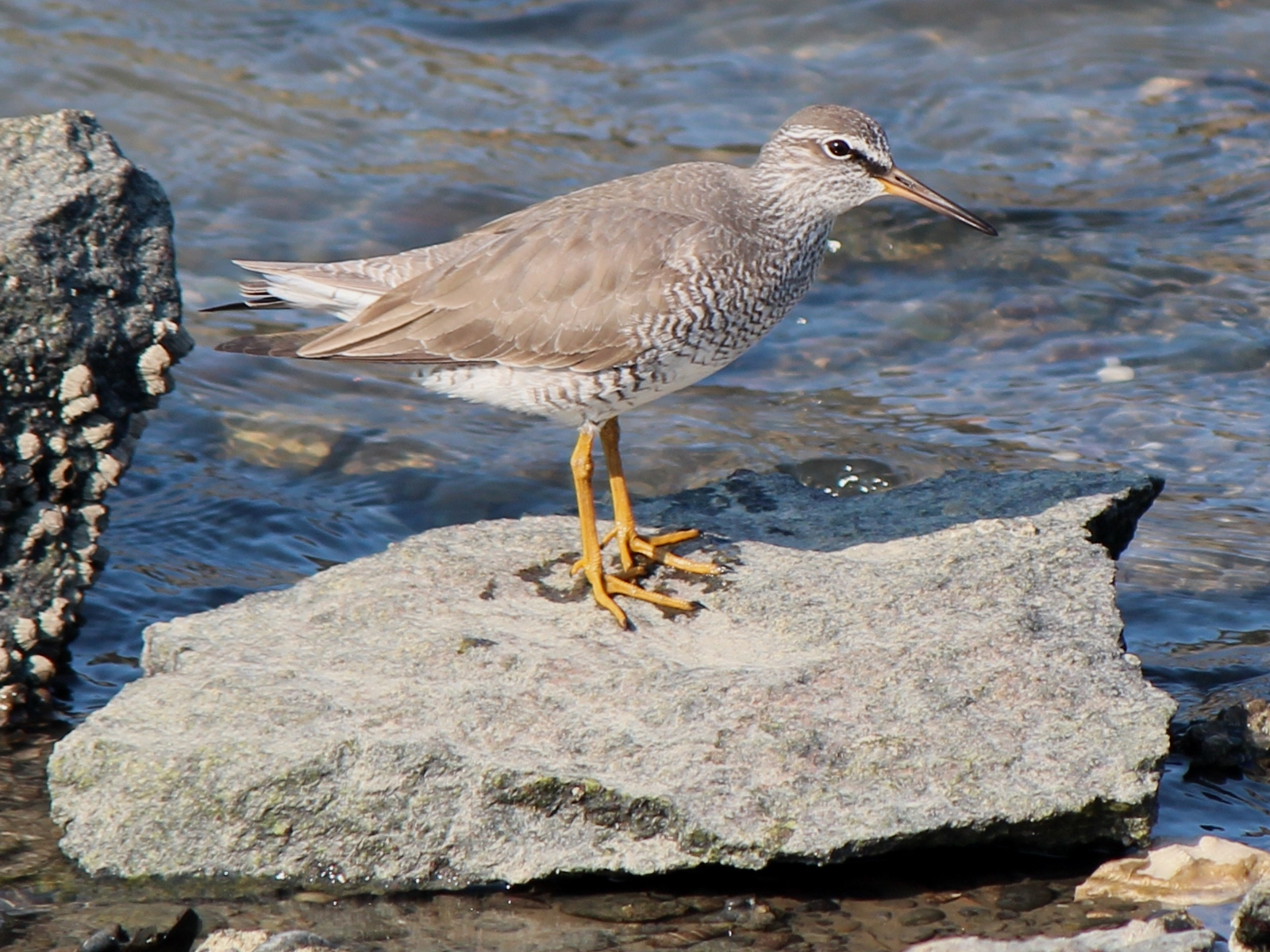
- Grey-tailed tattler (Tringa brevipes)

Scientific classification
- Kingdom: Animalia
- Phylum: Chordata
- Class: Aves
- Order: Charadriiformes
- Family: Scolopacidae
- Genus: Tringa

Groups included
- Tringa brevipes; Tringa incana

= Tattler (bird) =

Genus of birds

The tattlers are two very similar bird species in the shorebird genus Tringa. They formerly had their own genus, Heteroscelus. The old genus name means "different leg" in Greek, referring to the leg scales that differentiate the tattlers from their close relatives, the shanks.

The species are:

- Grey-tailed tattler, Tringa brevipes (formerly Heteroscelus brevipes)
- Wandering tattler, Tringa incana (formerly Heteroscelus incanus)

Tattlers resemble a common redshank (T. totanus) in shape and size, but not in color. Their upper parts, underwings, face and neck are greyish, and the belly and the weak supercilium are white, with some greyish streaking on the underside in breeding plumage. They have short yellowish legs and a bill with a pale base and dark tip.

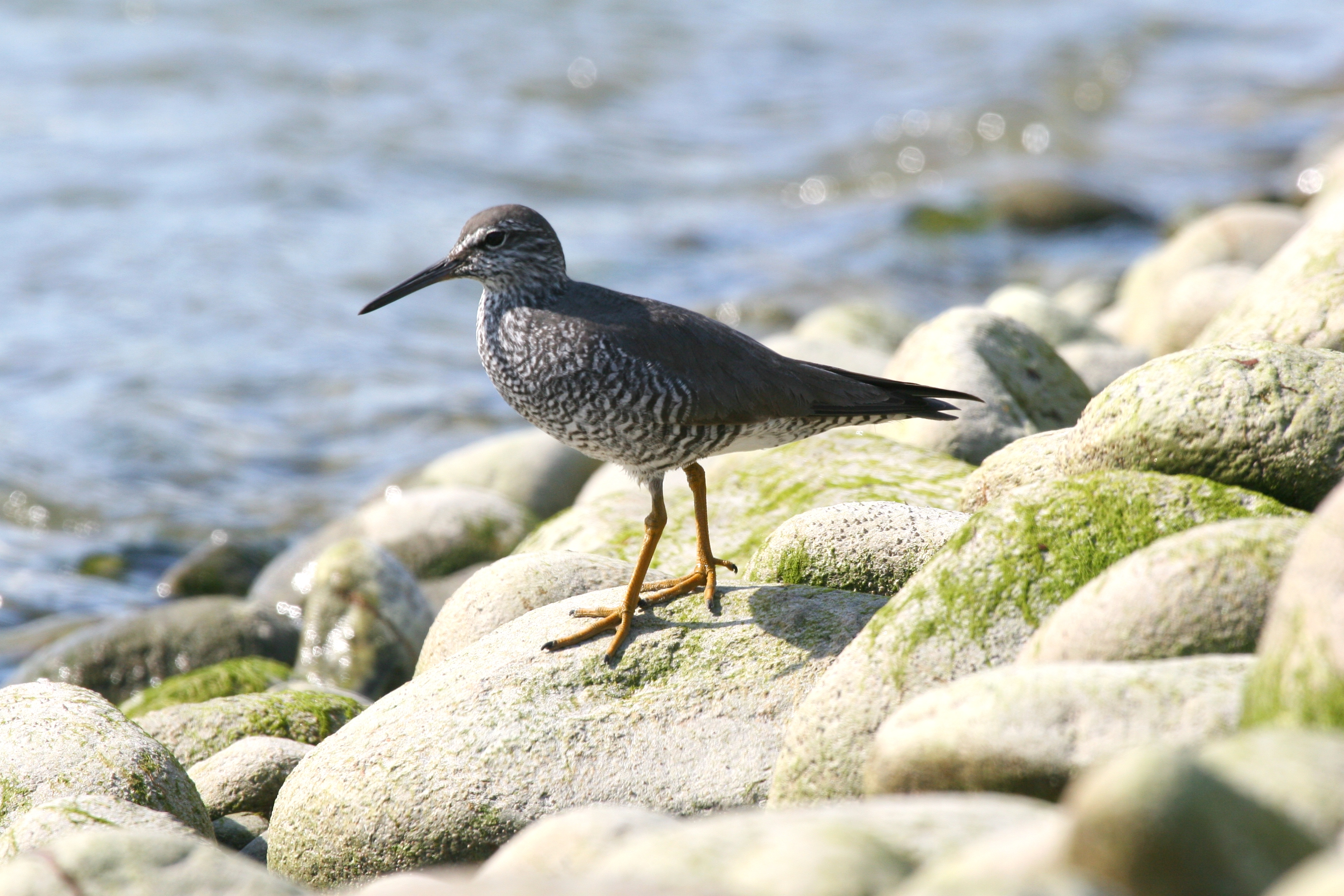
Wandering tattler in breeding plumage

Certain identification to species depends on details like the length of the nasal groove and scaling on the tarsus. Birds in breeding plumage can also (with some experience) be identified by the underside pattern: the grey-tailed tattler has fine barring on throat, breast and flanks only, which appear light grey from a distance; the rest of the underside is pure white. The wandering tattler has a coarser barring, still visible from quite far away, all the way from the throat to the undertail coverts. In non-breeding plumage, observers with much experience will note that the wandering tattler is an overall darker bird with very weak supercilia, whereas the grey-tailed tattler is lighter – particularly on the face, due to their stronger supercilia. Their normal calls also differ strongly; the grey-tailed tattler has a disyllabic whistle, whereas the wandering tattler has a rippling trill. But when they flee from the observer or are otherwise startled or excited, both species alike give a variety of longer or shorter alarm calls.

Tattlers are strongly migratory and winter in the tropics and subtropics on muddy and sandy coasts. These are not particularly gregarious birds and are seldom seen in large flocks except at roosts. These birds forage on the ground or water, picking up food by sight. They eat insects, crustaceans and other invertebrates.

Their breeding habitat is stony riverbeds. They nest on the ground, but these waders will perch in trees and sometimes use old nests of other birds.
