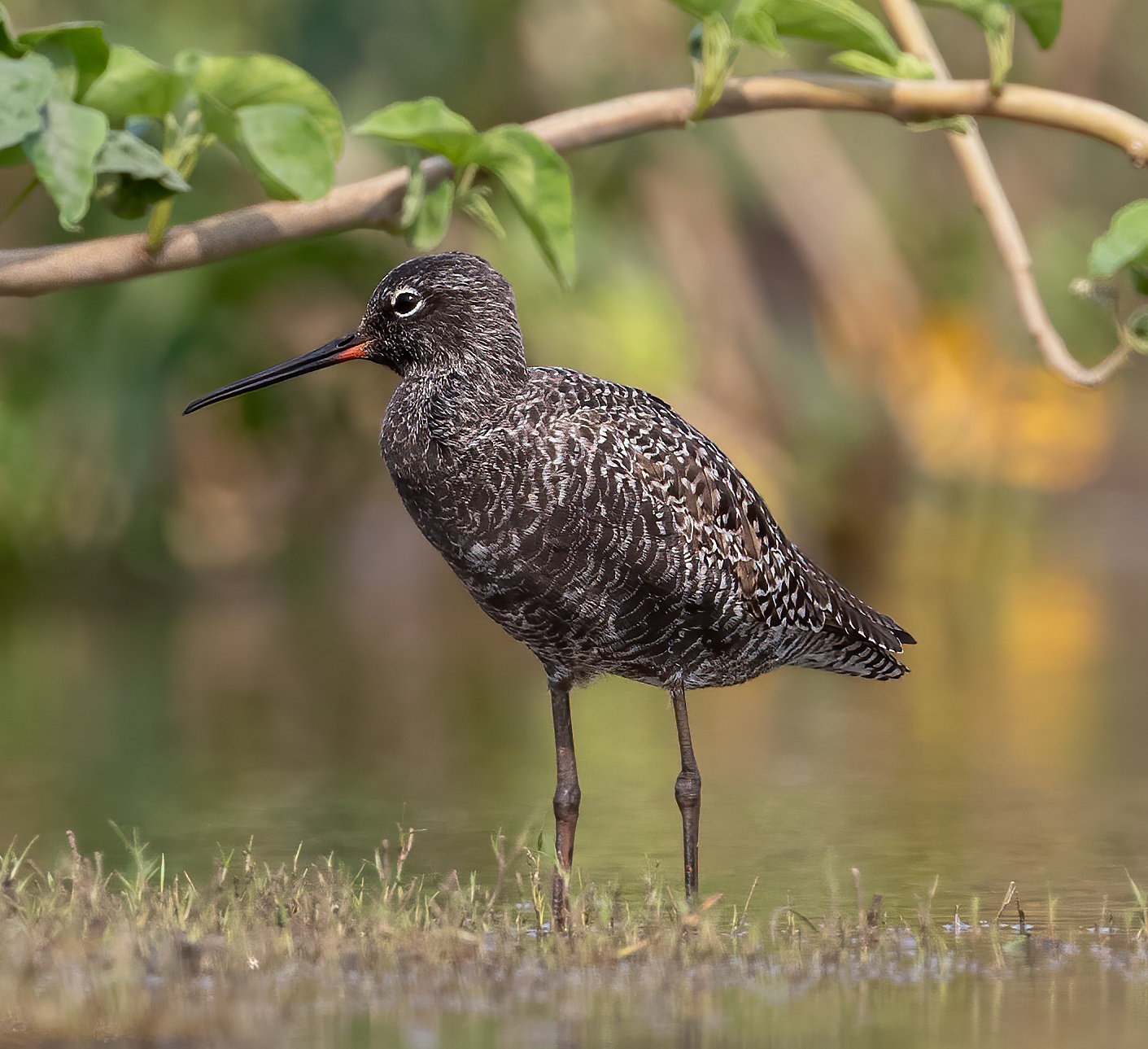
- In breeding plumage
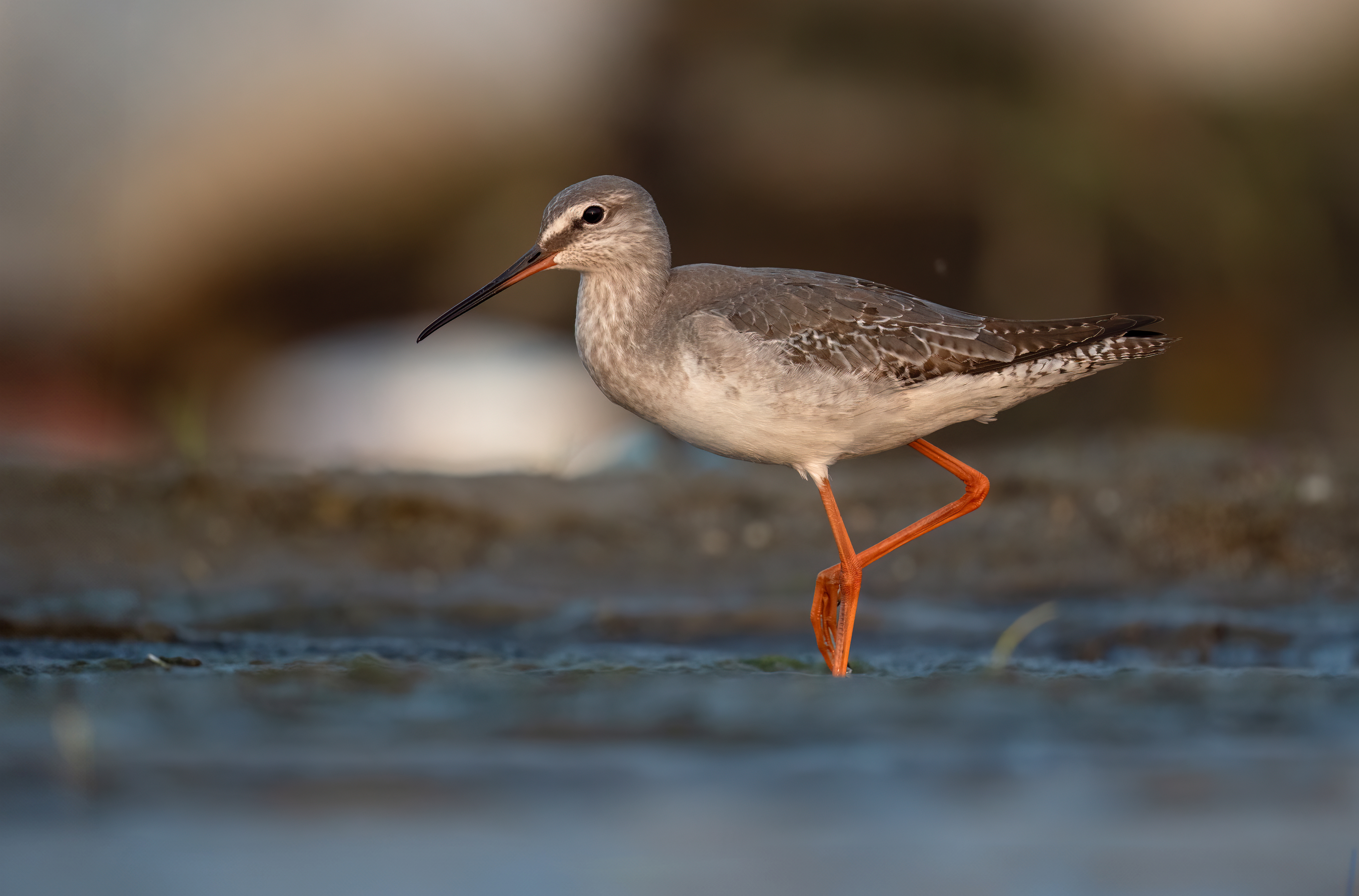
- In non-breeding plumage

Conservation status
- Least Concern (IUCN 3.1)

Scientific classification
- Kingdom: Animalia
- Phylum: Chordata
- Class: Aves
- Order: Charadriiformes
- Family: Scolopacidae
- Genus: Tringa
- Species: T. erythropus

Binomial name
- Tringa erythropus (Pallas, 1764)
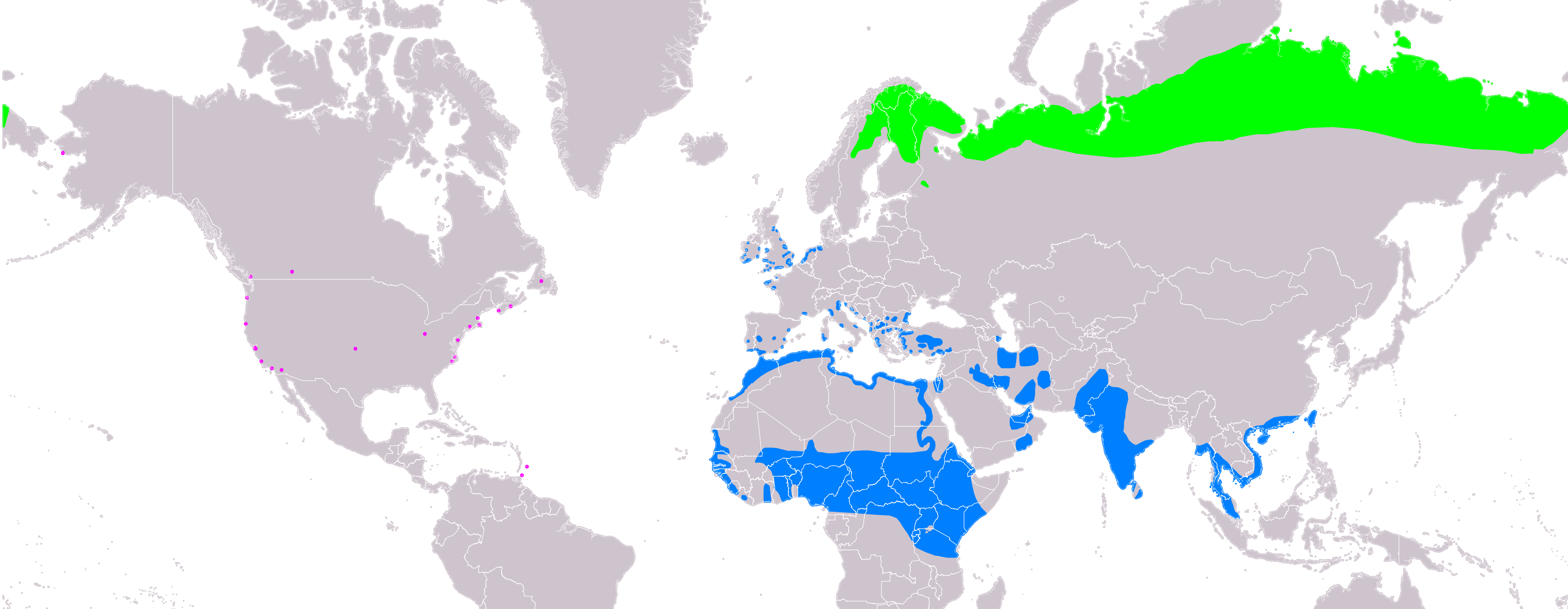
- Range of T. erythropus (Compiled by: BirdLife International and Handbook of the Birds of the World (2016) 2007) Breeding Non-breeding Vagrant (seasonality uncertain)

Synonyms
- Totanus fuscus

= Spotted redshank =

Species of bird

The spotted redshank (Tringa erythropus) is a wader (shorebird) in the large bird family Scolopacidae. It breeds across northern Scandinavia and the northern Palearctic and migrates south to the Mediterranean, the southern British Isles, France, tropical Africa, and tropical Asia for the winter. It is an occasional vagrant to Australia and North America.

== Taxonomy ==
The spotted redshank was described by German zoologist Peter Simon Pallas in 1764 and given the binomial name Scolopax erythropus. It is a monotypic species, with no recognised subspecies. Taxonomically, it forms a close-knit group with several other large Tringa species, with molecular sequencing showing it to be a sister clade to that containing the greater yellowlegs and the common greenshank. The genus name Tringa is the Neo-Latin name given to the green sandpiper by Aldrovandus in 1599 based on Ancient Greek trungas, a thrush-sized, white-rumped, tail-bobbing wading bird mentioned by Aristotle. The specific erythropus is from Ancient Greek eruthros, "red", and pous, "foot".

== Description ==
This is a large wader (shorebird), measuring 29–31 cm (11–12 in) long, (Note: By convention, length is measured from the tip of the bill to the tip of the tail on a dead bird (or skin) laid on its back.) with a wingspan of 61–67 cm (24–26 in) and a weight ranging from 121 to 205 g (4.3 to 7.2 oz). It is black in breeding plumage, and very pale in winter. It has a red legs and bill, and shows a white oval on the back in flight. Juveniles are grey-brown finely speckled white above, and have pale, finely barred underparts. Adults moult completely between July and October. In spring, the body plumage is moulted between March and May. Juveniles have a partial moult between August and February. The call is a creaking whistle teu-it (somewhat similar to the call of a roseate tern), the alarm call a kyip-kyip-kyip.

== Habitat and range ==
The spotted redshank breeds in the Arctic across much of the Palearctic, from Lapland in the west to Chukotskaya in the east.

== Behaviour ==
Nocturnal flight call

=== Food and feeding ===
Like most waders, it feeds on small invertebrates.

=== Breeding ===
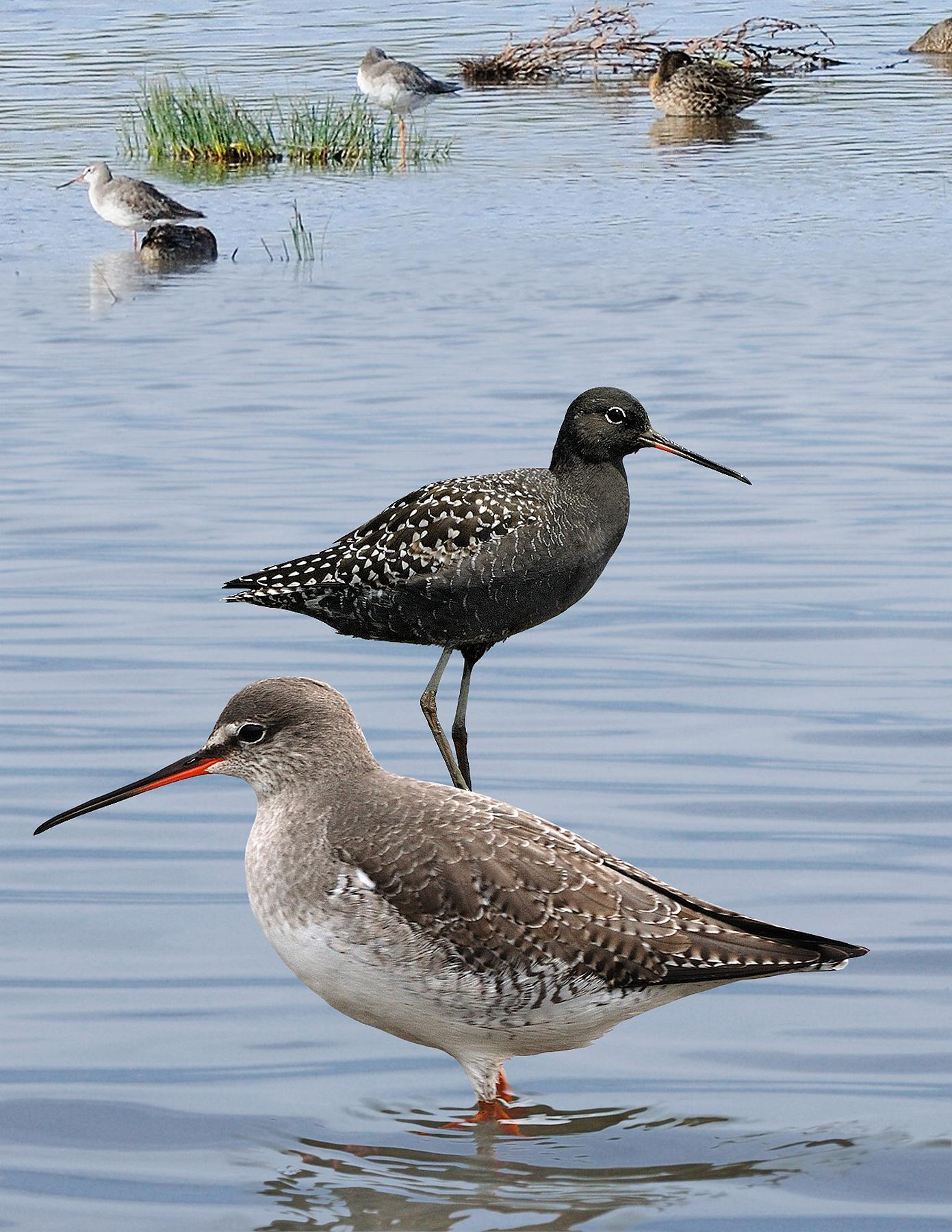
Composite image for identification

It nests on open boggy taiga, laying four eggs in a ground scrape. For breeding the bird moults to a black to dark grey with white spots. During breeding plumage the legs also turn a dark grey. See image alongside.

== Conservation and threats ==
The spotted redshank is one of the species to which the Agreement on the Conservation of African-Eurasian Migratory Waterbirds (AEWA) applies.
