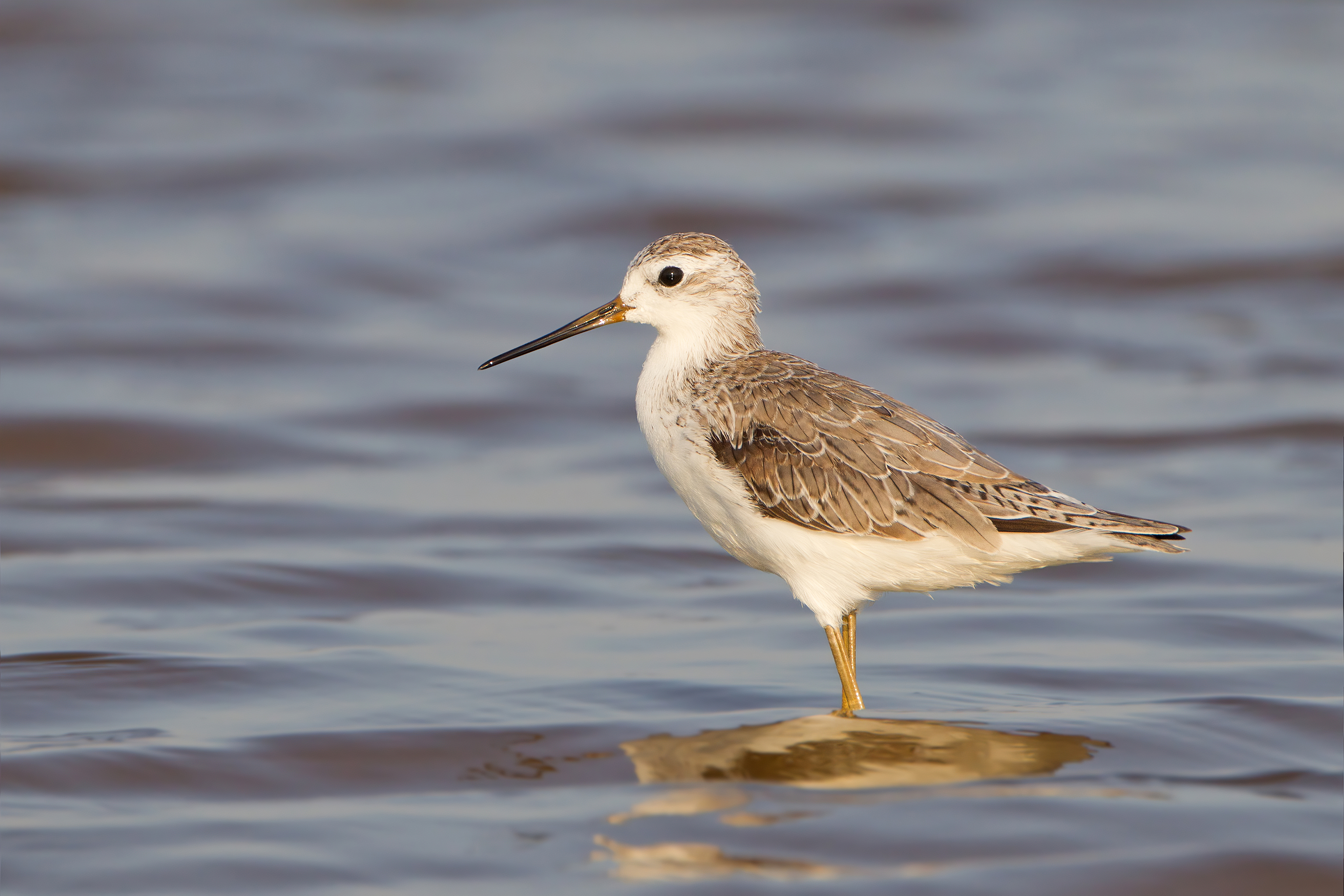
- Winter plumage

Conservation status
- Least Concern (IUCN 3.1)

Scientific classification
- Kingdom: Animalia
- Phylum: Chordata
- Class: Aves
- Order: Charadriiformes
- Family: Scolopacidae
- Genus: Tringa
- Species: T. stagnatilis

Binomial name
- Tringa stagnatilis (Bechstein, 1803)
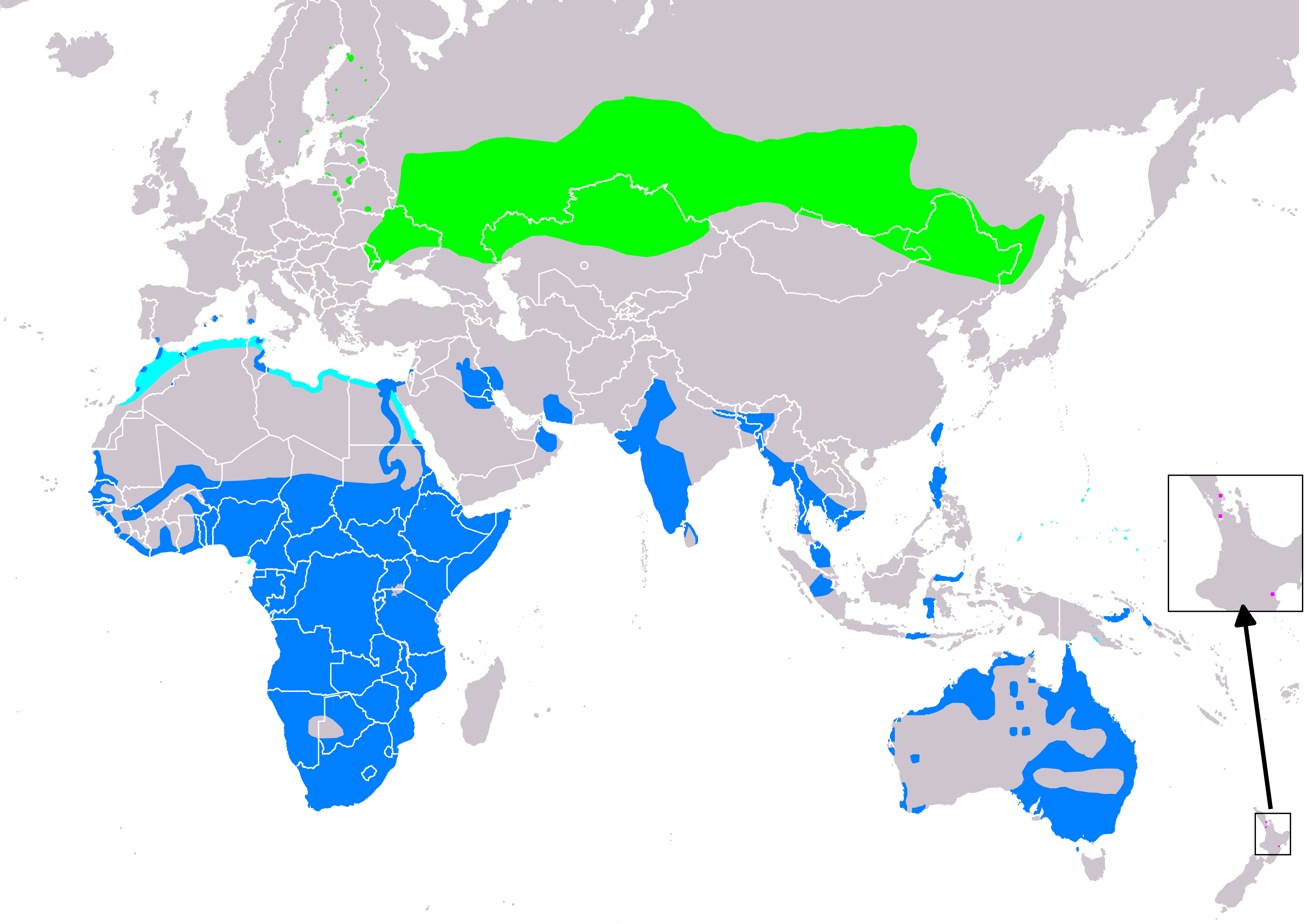
- Range of T. stagnatilis Breeding Non-breeding Passage Vagrant (seasonality uncertain)

= Marsh sandpiper =

Species of bird

The marsh sandpiper (Tringa stagnatilis) is a small wader. It is a rather small shank, and breeds in open grassy steppe and taiga wetlands from easternmost Europe to the Russian Far East. The genus name Tringa is the Neo-Latin name given to the green sandpiper by Aldrovandus in 1599 based on Ancient Greek trungas, a thrush-sized, white-rumped, tail-bobbing wading bird mentioned by Aristotle. The specific stagnatilis is from Latin stagnum, "swamp".

== Description ==
The marsh sandpiper resembles a small elegant greenshank, with a long fine bill and very long yellowish legs. Like the greenshank, it is greyish brown in breeding plumage, paler in winter, and has a white wedge up its back that is visible in flight. However, it is more closely related to the common redshank and the wood sandpiper. Together, they form a group of smallish shanks which tend to have red or reddish legs, and in breeding plumage are generally a subdued, light brown above with some darker mottling, with a pattern of somewhat diffuse small brownish spots on the breast and neck. The length is 22–26 cm (8.7–10.2 in), wingspan is 55–59 cm (22–23 in) and weight is 45–120 g (1.6–4.2 oz).

== Distribution ==
The marsh sandpiper breeds in the Palearctic. It is a migratory species, with a majority of birds wintering in Africa and India, and some migrating to Southeast Asia and Australia. They prefer to winter on fresh water wetlands such as swamps and lakes and are usually seen singly or in small groups.

Marsh sandpipers are rare vagrants to North America, with most records in Alaska and California. The first marsh sandpiper recorded in Canada was found on 30 April 2022 in Thedford, Lambton County, Ontario by James Holdsworth, and attracted over a thousand birders from Ontario and Michigan, as well as birders from as far away as Texas and Washington State.. A sighting was recorded in Baja California, Mexico in October 2011.

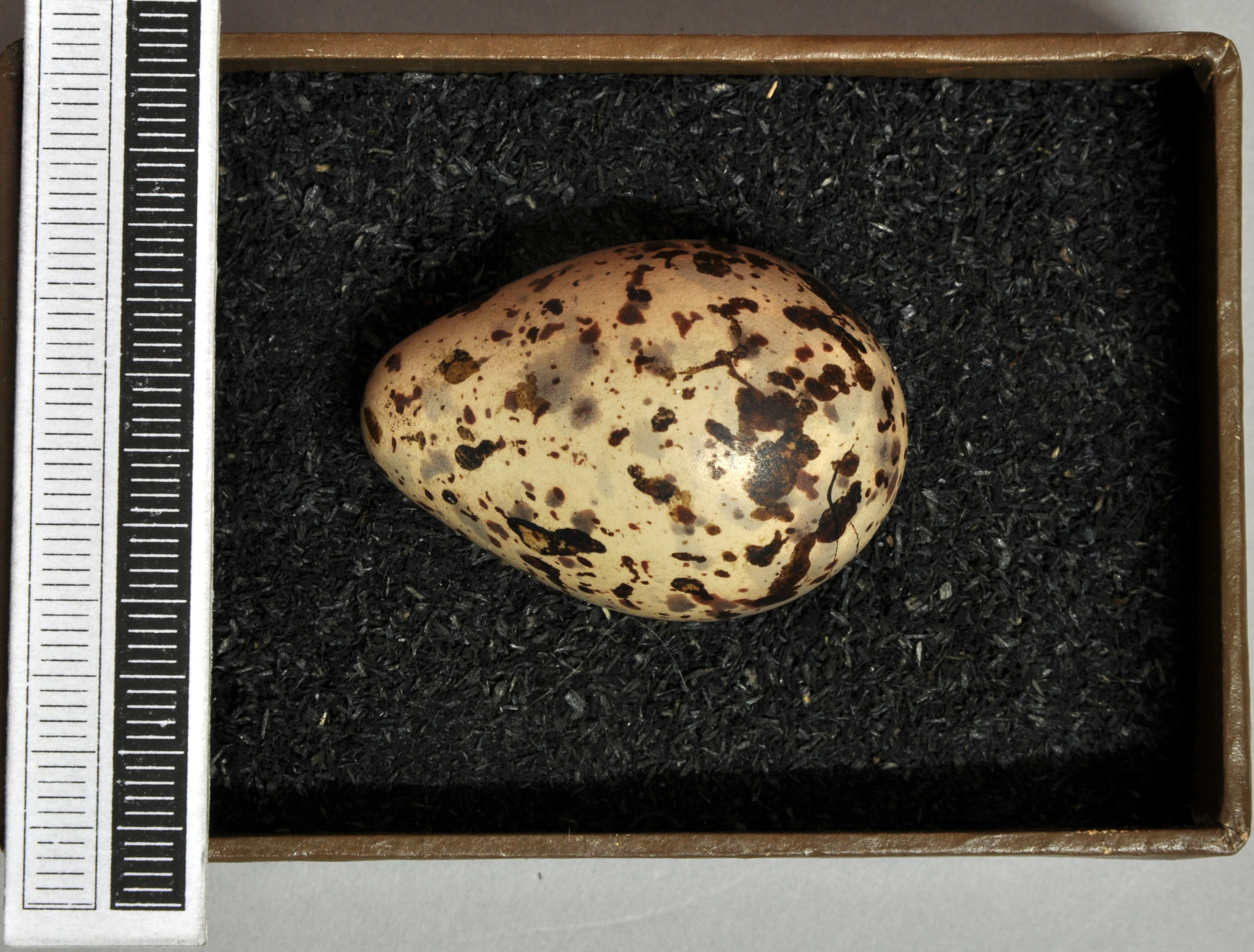
Egg, Collection Museum Wiesbaden

The marsh sandpiper is one of the species to which the Agreement on the Conservation of African-Eurasian Migratory Waterbirds (AEWA) applies.
