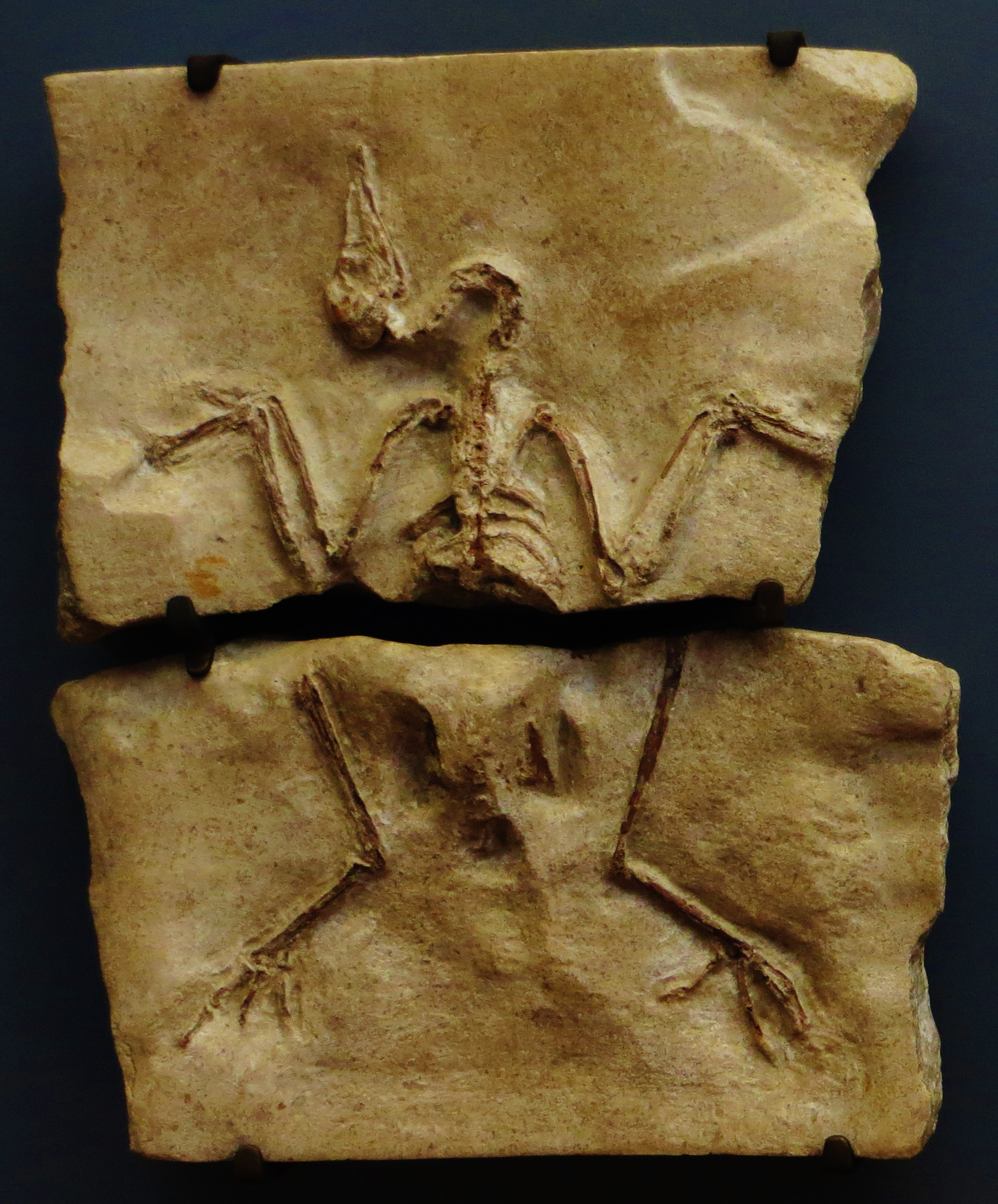
- Skeleton

Scientific classification
- Kingdom: Animalia
- Phylum: Chordata
- Class: Aves
- Order: Gruiformes (?)
- Genus: Ludiortyx; Brodkorb, 1964
- Species: L. hoffmanni

Binomial name
- Ludiortyx hoffmanni (Gervais, 1852)

Synonyms
- Genus: Eortyx Brodkorb, 1967; Species: Ludiortyx blanchardi (Milne-Edwards, 1869); and see text

= Ludiortyx =

Ludiortyx Temporal range: Late Eocene

Extinct species of bird

Ludiortyx is a bird genus from the Late Eocene. Its remains have been found in the Montmartre Formation at the Montmartre (Paris, France). A single species is accepted, Ludiortyx hoffmanni.

This bird is of uncertain relationships; it has been variously considered to be an ancestral rail or to belong to the Quercymegapodiidae, a prehistoric group of Galliformes (landfowl). The material assigned to it were initially considered to be of 2 species, one that was at first believed to be a Tringa wader, the other assigned to the galliform genus Palaeortyx. Even the latter assignment was probably much in error as though its relationships are not known, Palaeortyx was probably not a quercymegapodiid.

== Synonyms ==
Apart from the genus-level synonym Eortyx, L. hoffmanni has undergone quite a number of name changes due to the confusion about its placement:

- Tringa hoffmanni Gervais, 1852
- Palaeortyx hoffmanni (Gervais, 1852)
- Palaeortyx blanchardi Milne-Edwards, 1869
- Ludiortyx blanchardi (Milne-Edwards, 1869)
- Eortyx hoffmanni (Gervais, 1852)
