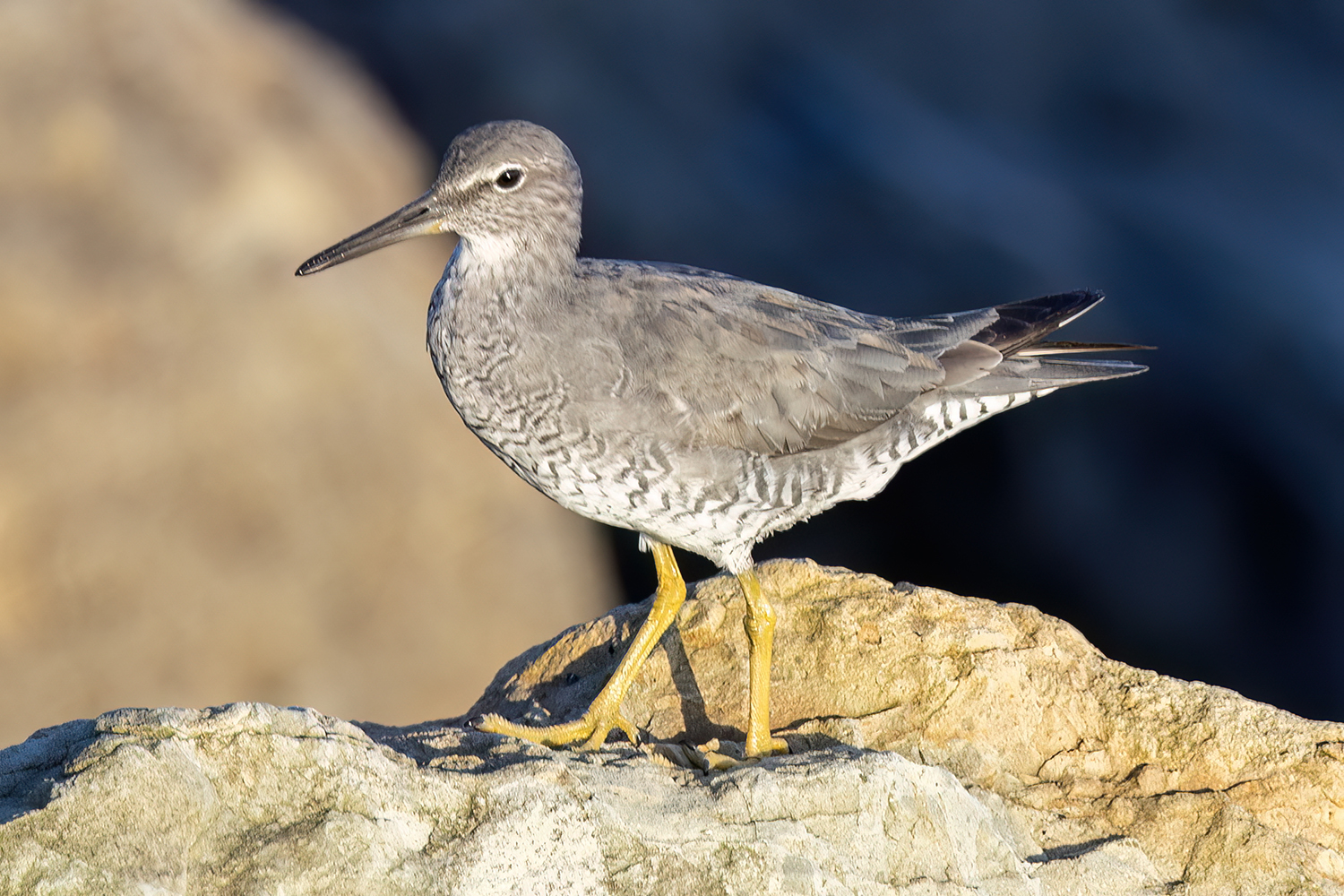
- Adult in breeding plumage
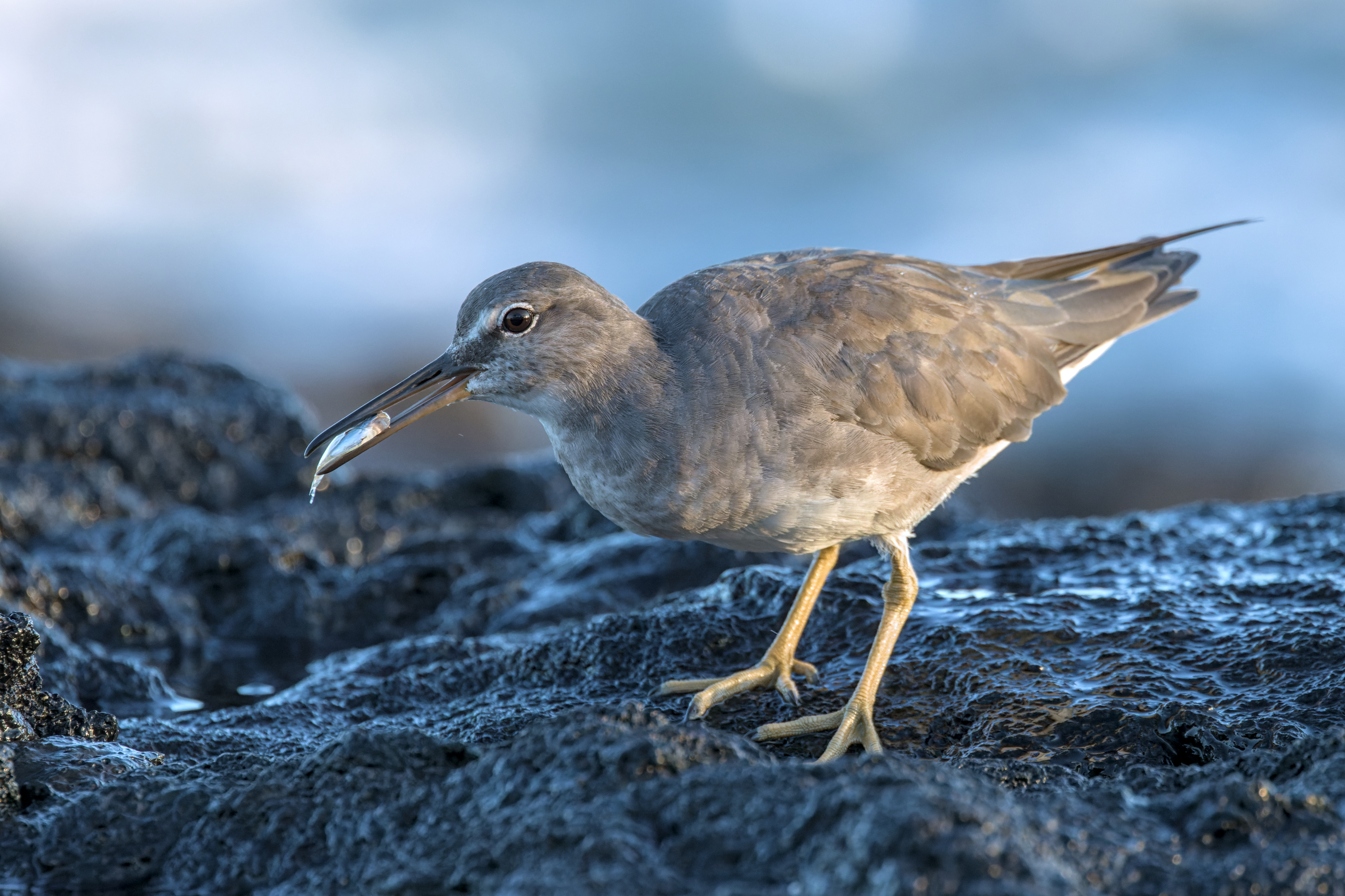
- Adult in nonbreeding plumage

Conservation status
- Least Concern (IUCN 3.1)

Scientific classification
- Kingdom: Animalia
- Phylum: Chordata
- Class: Aves
- Order: Charadriiformes
- Family: Scolopacidae
- Genus: Tringa
- Species: T. incana

Binomial name
- Tringa incana (Gmelin, JF, 1789)
- Breeding Migration Nonbreeding

Synonyms
- Heteractitis incanus Heteroscelus incanus

= Wandering tattler =

Species of bird

The wandering tattler (Tringa incana) is a medium-sized shorebird, similar in appearance to the closely related gray-tailed tattler (T. brevipes). The tattlers are unique among the species of Tringa for having unpatterned, greyish wings and backs, and a scaly breast pattern extending more or less onto the belly in breeding plumage, in which both also have a rather prominent supercilium.

== Description ==
The wandering tattler was formally described in 1789 by the German naturalist Johann Friedrich Gmelin in his revised and expanded edition of Carl Linnaeus's Systema Naturae. He placed it in the genus Scolopax and coined the binomial name Scolopax incana. Gmelin based his description on the "ash-coloured snipe" that had been described in 1785 by the English ornithologist John Latham in his book A General Synopsis of Birds. Latham's specimen had been supplied by the naturalist Joseph Banks. It had been collected in 1777 by William Anderson on the island of Mo'orea in the Society Islands during James Cook's third voyage to the Pacific Ocean. The wandering tattler was moved to the genus Heteroscelus which had been introduced by Spencer Fullerton Baird in 1858. and then in 2006 moved to the current genus Tringa based on a molecular phylogenetic study published the previous year. The genus name Tringa is the Neo-Latin word given to the green sandpiper by the Italian naturalist Ulisse Aldrovandi in 1603 based on Ancient Greek trungas, a thrush-sized, white-rumped, tail-bobbing wading bird mentioned by Aristotle. The specific epithet incana is from the Latin incanus meany "light gray" or "hoary". The species is monotypic: no subspecies are recognised.

These birds have stocky bodies with gray upperparts, underwings, face and neck and a white belly. They have short dark yellow legs and a dark gray bill. Their length is 26–30 cm, their weight is 60–169 g, and their wingspan is 50–55 cm. Adults in breeding plumage are heavily barred underneath. The call is a rapid trill of accelerating, staccato notes. It can consist of three or four beats per call.

== Distribution and ecology ==
Point Cartwright, SE Queensland, Australia

In summer, the wandering tattler is found in far-eastern Russia, Alaska, portions of the California coast and northwestern Canada. They nest in rocky areas along mountain streams. The female lays four olive-colored eggs in a shallow depression. Both parents incubate and help feed the young, who are soon able to forage for themselves. At other times, they are found on rocky islands in the southwest Pacific and on rocky Pacific coasts from California to South America and as far as Australia. In the nonbreeding season it is well distributed throughout the Pacific, often seeking coastlines and isolated islands.

They feed on aquatic invertebrates such as crustaceans and marine worms. During breeding season, they also eat insects. While wading, they forage actively, making jerky bobbing movements. Feeding behaviors can include repeated returns to the same location over short periods of time. They can be seen flying low over a rocky coastline or along a jetty.
