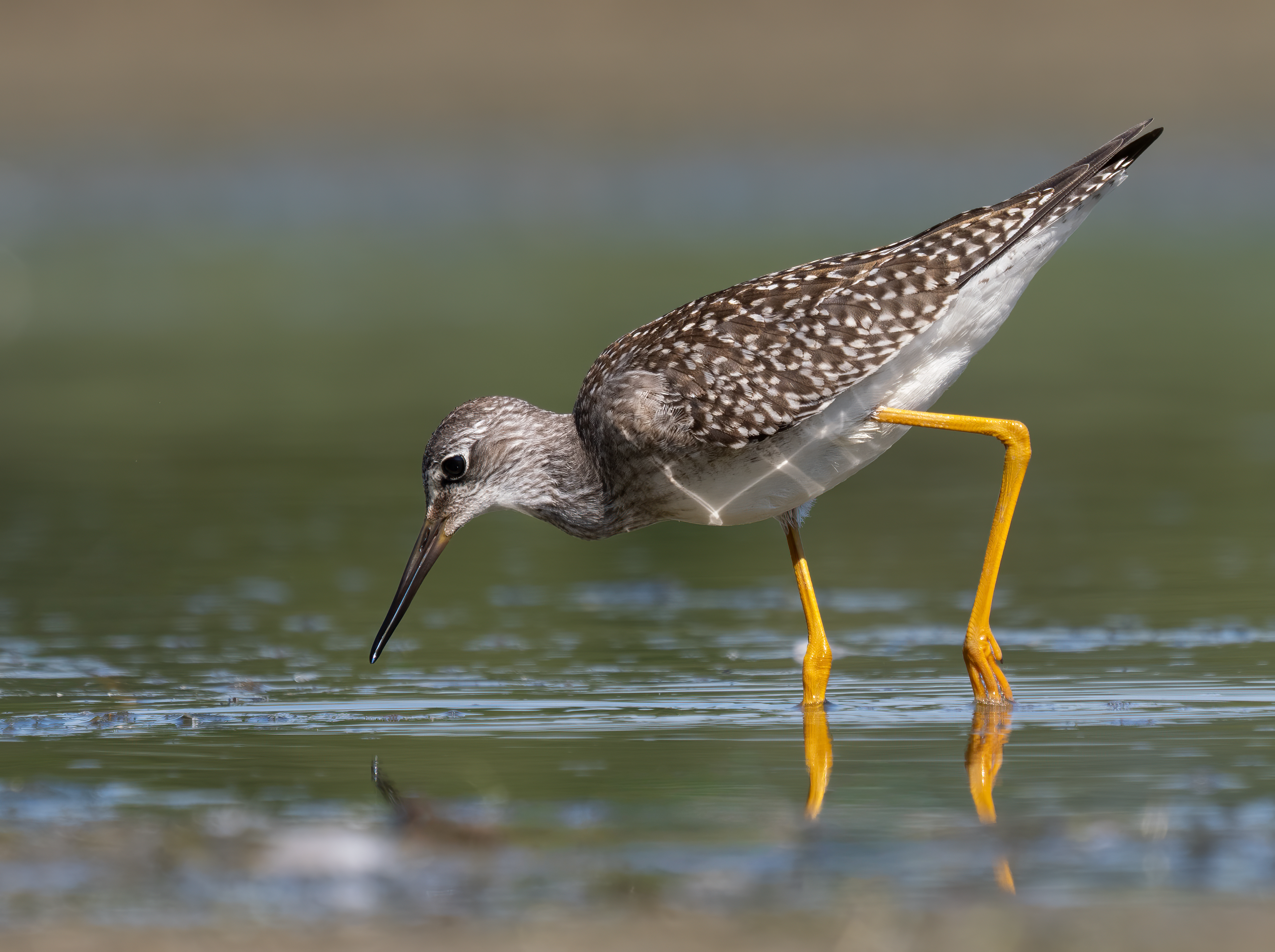

Conservation status
- Vulnerable (IUCN 3.1)

Scientific classification
- Kingdom: Animalia
- Phylum: Chordata
- Class: Aves
- Order: Charadriiformes
- Family: Scolopacidae
- Genus: Tringa
- Species: T. flavipes

Binomial name
- Tringa flavipes (Gmelin, JF, 1789)
- Breeding Migration Nonbreeding

Synonyms
- Totanus flavipes

= Lesser yellowlegs =

Species of medium-sized shorebird

The lesser yellowlegs (Tringa flavipes) is a medium-sized shorebird. It breeds in the boreal forest region of North America, and winters from the south of North America, to the far south of South America.

== Taxonomy ==
The lesser yellowlegs was formally described in 1789 by the German naturalist Johann Friedrich Gmelin in his revised and expanded edition of Carl Linnaeus's Systema Naturae. He placed it in the genus Scolopax and coined the binomial name Scolopax flavipes. Gmelin based his description on the "yellow shanks" seen in the province of New York in autumn that had been described in 1785 by both the English ornithologist John Latham and the Welsh naturalist Thomas Pennant. The lesser yellowlegs is now placed in the genus Tringa that was introduced in 1758 by the Swedish naturalist Carl Linnaeus in the tenth edition of his Systema Naturae. The name Tringa is the Neo-Latin word given to the green sandpiper by the Italian naturalist Ulisse Aldrovandi in 1603 based on Ancient Greek trungas, a thrush-sized, white-rumped, tail-bobbing wading bird mentioned by Aristotle. The specific epithet flavipes combines the Latin flavus meaning "yellow" with pes meaning "foot". The species is monotypic: no subspecies are recognised.

== Description ==
The lesser yellowlegs is a medium-large shorebird, 23–25 cm (9.1–9.8 in) in overall length and with a wingspan of 59–64 cm (23–25 in) and a weight of 67–94 g (2.4–3.3 oz). The sexes are similar both in plumage and in overall size. In breeding plumage, the upperparts are mottled with grey-brown, black and white. The underparts are white with irregular brown streaking on the breast and neck. In non-breeding plumage, the upperparts are more uniform grey-brown. The legs are yellow. Compared to the greater yellowlegs, the bill is shorter (visually about the same length as the head), slim, straight, and uniformly dark. The breast is streaked and the flanks are finely marked with short bars.

This species is similar in appearance to the larger greater yellowlegs, although it is more closely related to the much larger willet; the fine, clear, and dense pattern of the neck shown in breeding plumage indicates these species' actual relationships.

The call of this bird is softer than that of the greater yellowlegs.

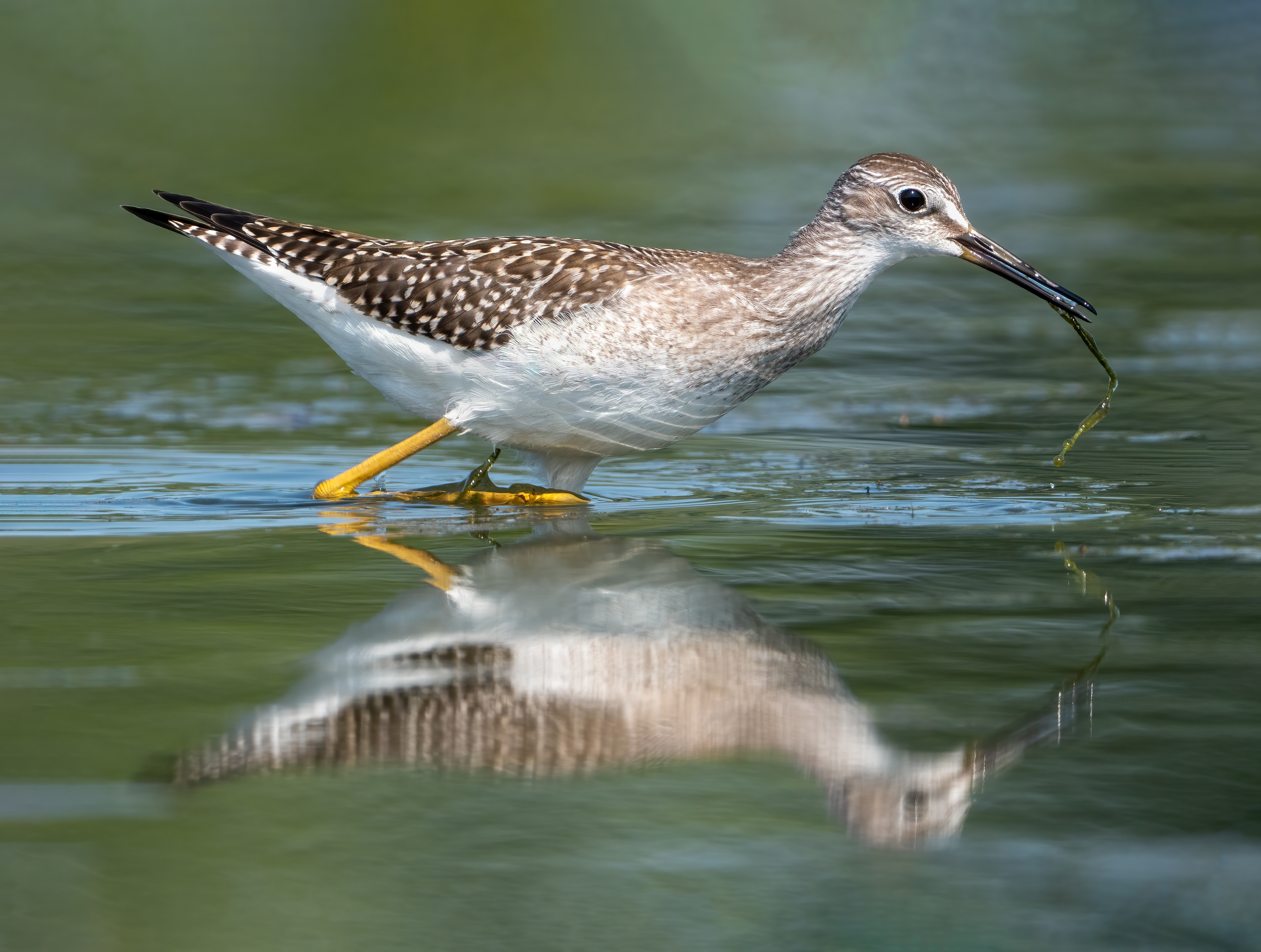
Lesser yellowlegs foraging in Queens, New York

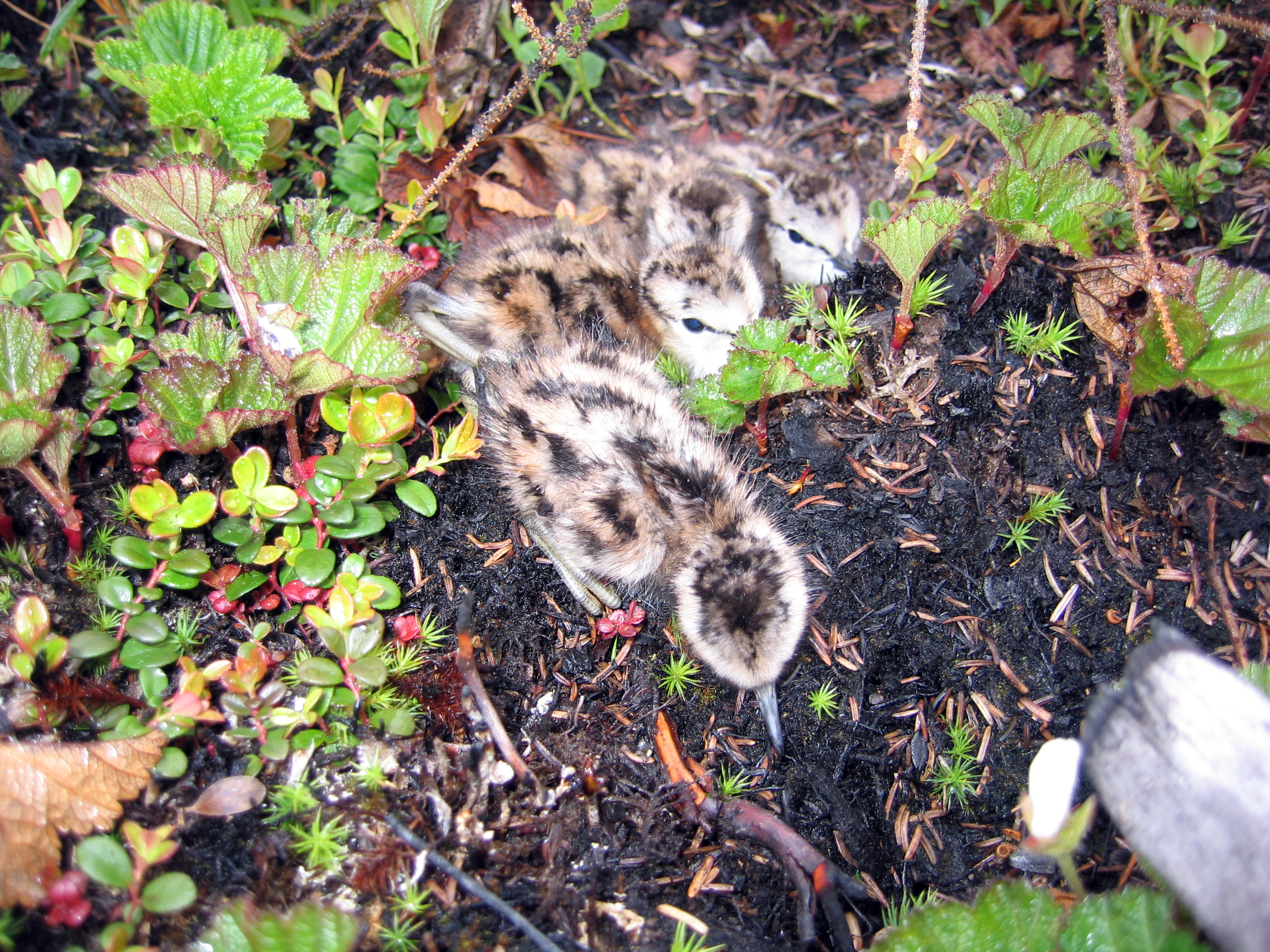
Chicks

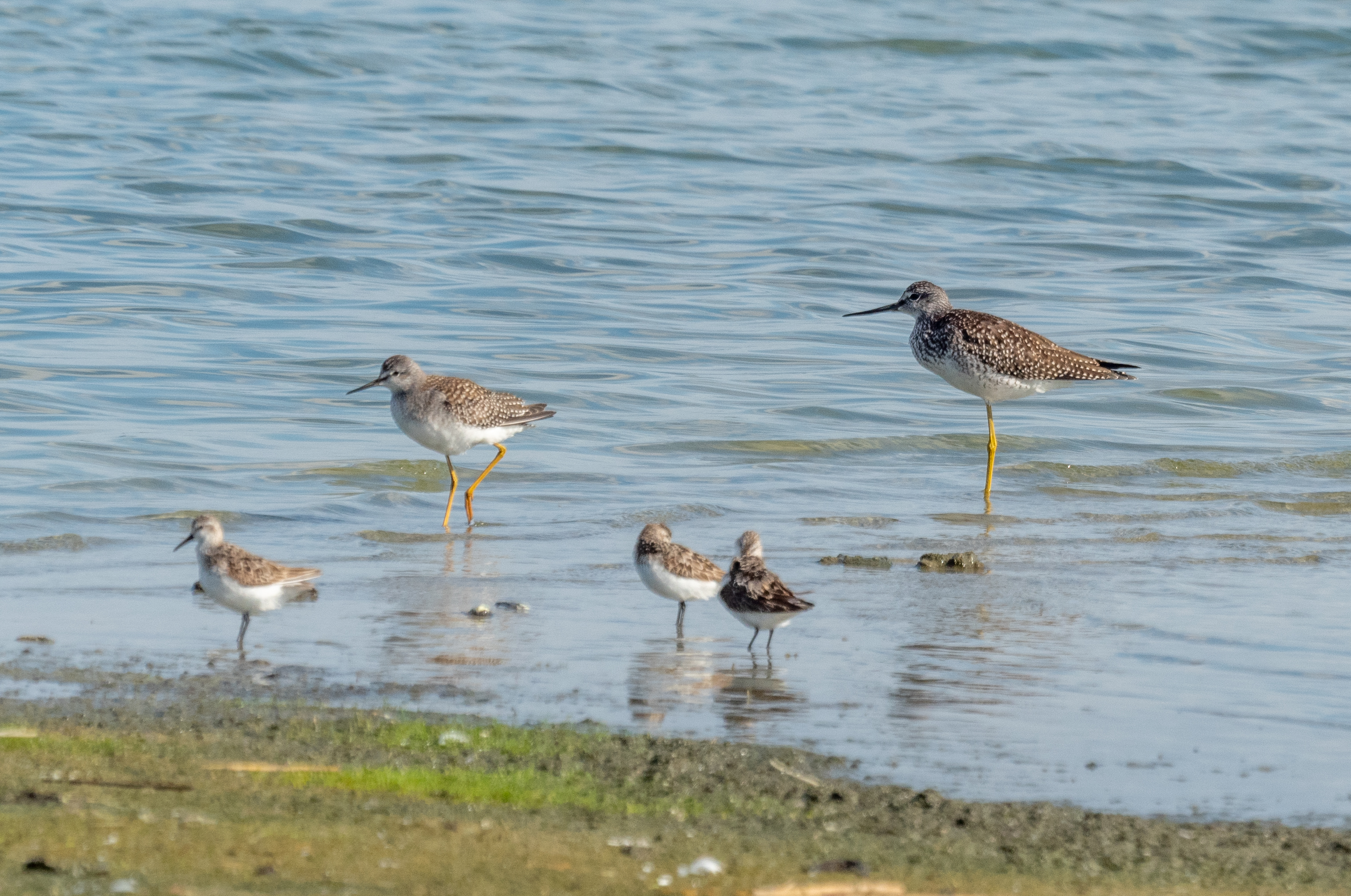
Lesser yellowlegs (left) are smaller, with a proportionally shorter bill than greater yellowlegs (right). Semipalmated sandpipers in the foreground.

== Distribution and habitat ==
The lesser yellowlegs breeds across interior Alaska and northern Canada, extending eastward to central Quebec. Its breeding range lies primarily between 51° and 69° N latitude in appropriate wetland habitats.

The lesser yellowlegs is a highly migratory bird. During winter, lesser yellowlegs at the Atlantic coast of North America, from New Jersey southward, travel along the Pacific coast as far north as San Francisco Bay, and throughout the coastal regions of the Gulf of Mexico and the Gulf of California. They are widely distributed in Mexico, Central America, South America, and the Antilles, with the largest populations found wintering in these regions. Smaller numbers also winter inland throughout this range. This species is a regular vagrant to western Europe and elsewhere; in Great Britain about five birds arrive each year, mostly between August and October, with the occasional individual overwintering. Their breeding habitat is clearings near ponds in the boreal forest region from Alaska to Quebec.

== Behaviour and ecology ==
=== Breeding ===
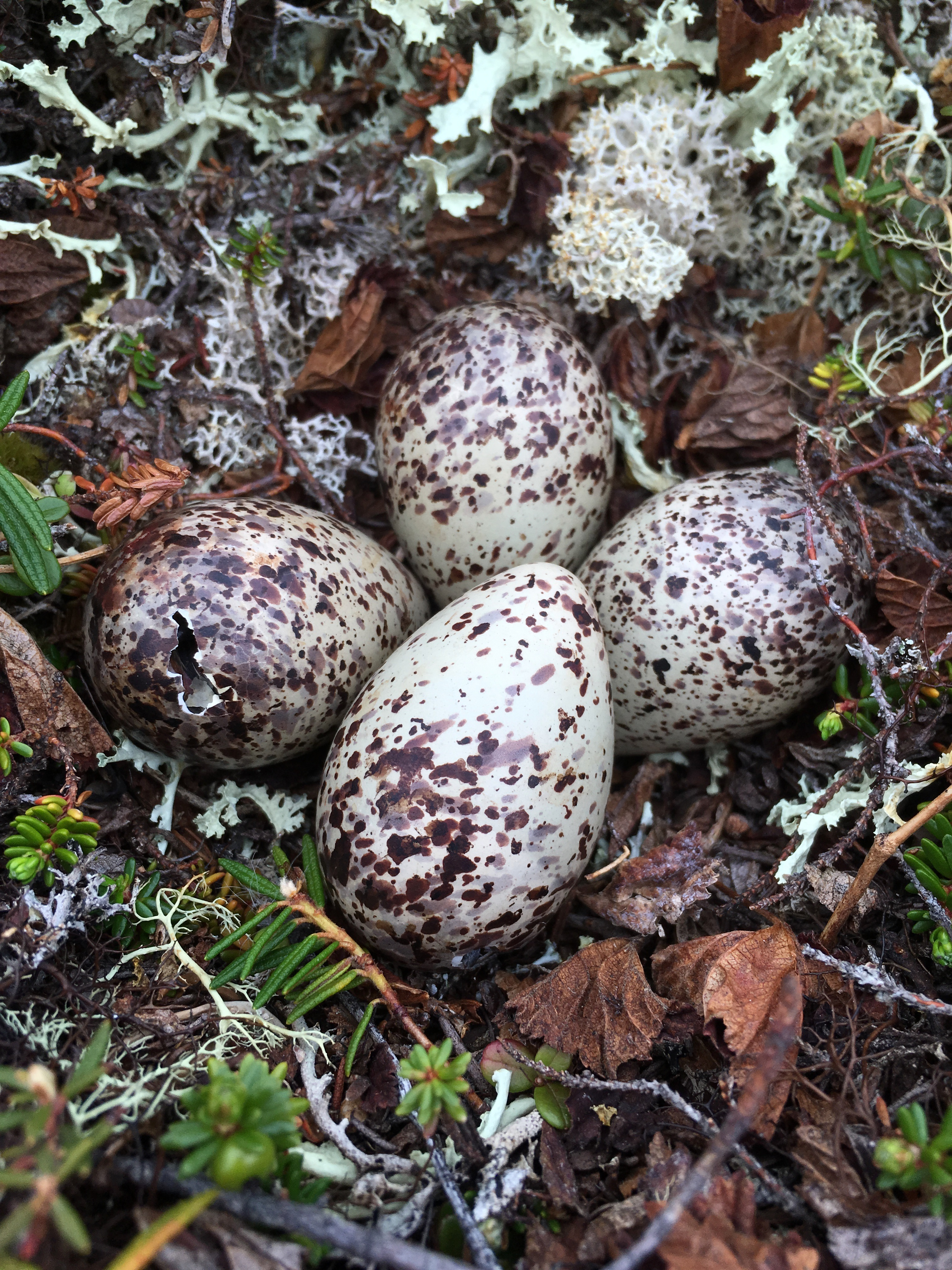
Hatching lesser yellowlegs nest near Churchill, Manitoba, Canada. The egg on the far left of the frame is 'pipped', with the chick's bill breaking through the egg membrane and shell; the chick will emerge within 24 hours.

The nest is a depression on dry mossy ground and is usually well hidden, typically within 200 metres of a water source and next to fallen branches, logs, or underneath low shrubs. The clutch is normally three to five eggs. These are buff or grey-brown and are covered in spots of various shades of brown. On average, the egg length is about 3.9–4.7 cm (1.5–1.9 in), and the egg width is about 2.7–3.1 cm (1.1–1.2 in). They are incubated for 22-23 days by both sexes. Both parents brood and care for the precocial young, which leave the nest a few hours after hatching. They can feed themselves upon departure from the nest. They fly at 23 to 31 days.

=== Food and feeding ===
Foraging

Lesser yellowlegs forage in shallow water or on land. They primarily eat invertebrates they glean (such as flies, beetles, water boatmen, and mayflies) ^{[1][2],} small fish, crustaceans, aquatic worms, molluscs (such as snails), spiders, and seeds.^{[3][1]} They are very active when foraging, moving quickly with a high-stepping gait, neck outstretched, to pick at prey with quick jabs of the bill. Less often, they probe into mud or sweep the bill back and forth through water. Sometimes forages at night

=== Predation ===
A wide variety of avian predators prey on lesser yellowlegs. Peregrine falcons, merlins, long-tailed jaegers, northern harriers, northern goshawks, sharp-shinned hawks, short-eared owls, and gyrfalcons are the main predators of adult lesser yellowlegs and their fledglings. Adult lesser yellowlegs protect their nest and eggs by attacking potential predators. Sandhill cranes, peregrine falcons, merlins, northern harriers, bald eagles, mew gulls, herring gulls, short-eared owls, common ravens, black-billed magpies, coyotes, and domestic cats are predators who eat baby lesser yellowlegs and their eggs.

Lesser yellowlegs, when defending their nests and young from predators, will show aggression and fight with invaders, including joining together to fight predators. Nesting lesser yellowlegs are very reluctant to leave their nests, only leaving when a predator is less than 1 metre away to fight and keep the predators away from their nest. They may swoop down to attack the predator or use distraction strategies to lure it away.

=== Threats ===
Human activity poses the biggest threat to the lesser yellowlegs, with hunting likely the most serious. Tens of thousands of birds are taken annually, principally during post-breeding migration in the Caribbean and northern South America. The species also suffers from habitat loss and degradation, such as the loss of intertidal mudflats and mangroves in Suriname and Guyana, and the conversion of wetlands to agriculture, particularly in southeastern South America. Climate change may also have an effect on the bird's breeding habitat. It is possible that predation from red foxes is also on the increase although evidence on this is inconclusive.
