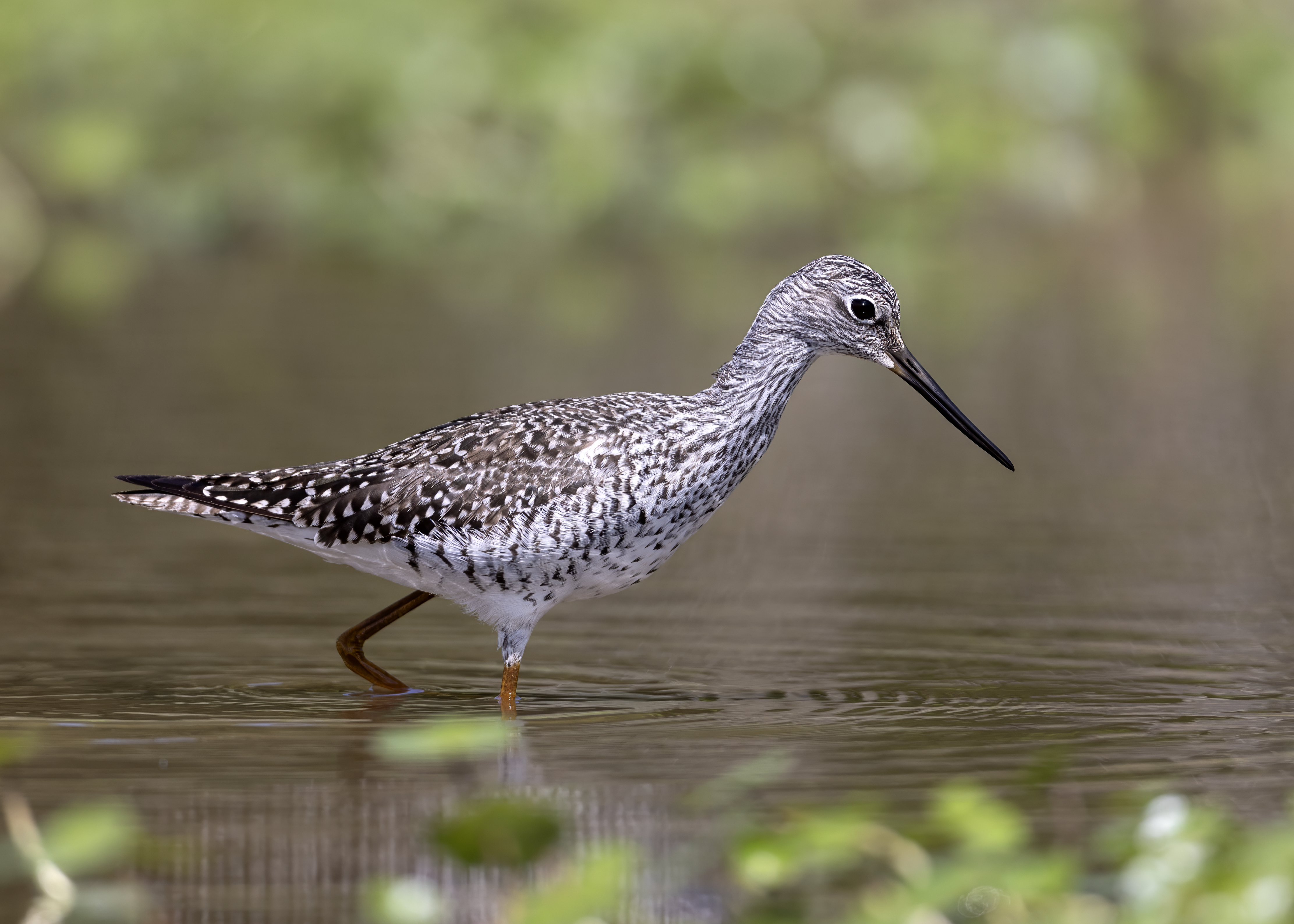

Conservation status
- Near Threatened (IUCN 3.1)

Scientific classification
- Kingdom: Animalia
- Phylum: Chordata
- Class: Aves
- Order: Charadriiformes
- Family: Scolopacidae
- Genus: Tringa
- Species: T. melanoleuca

Binomial name
- Tringa melanoleuca (Gmelin, JF, 1789)
- Breeding Migration Nonbreeding

Synonyms
- Totanus melanoleucus

= Greater yellowlegs =

Species of bird

The greater yellowlegs (Tringa melanoleuca) is a large shorebird in the family Scolopacidae. It breeds in central Canada and southern Alaska and winters in southern North America, Central America, the West Indies and South America.

== Taxonomy ==
The greater yellowlegs was formally described in 1789 by the German naturalist Johann Friedrich Gmelin in his revised and expanded edition of Carl Linnaeus's Systema Naturae. He placed it in the genus Scolopax and coined the binomial name Scolopax melanoleuca. Gmelin based his description on the "stone snipe" seen feeding in autumn in Chateau Bay, Labrador, that had been described in 1785 by both the English ornithologist John Latham and by the Welsh naturalist Thomas Pennant. The greater yellowlegs is now placed in the genus Tringa that was introduced in 1758 by the Swedish naturalist Carl Linnaeus in the tenth edition of his Systema Naturae. The name Tringa is the Neo-Latin word given to the green sandpiper by the Italian naturalist Ulisse Aldrovandi in 1603 based on Ancient Greek trungas, a thrush-sized, white-rumped, tail-bobbing wading bird mentioned by Aristotle. The specific epithet melanoleuca combines the Ancient Greek melas meaning "black" with leukos meaning "white". The species is monotypic: no subspecies are recognised.

== Description ==
The greater yellowlegs is similar in appearance to the smaller lesser yellowlegs. Its closest relative, however, is the greenshank, which together with the spotted redshank form a close-knit group. Among them, these three species show all the basic leg and foot colours found in the shanks, demonstrating that this character is paraphyletic. They are also the largest shanks apart from the willet, which is altogether more robustly built. The greater yellowlegs and the greenshank share a coarse, dark, and fairly crisp breast pattern as well as much black on the shoulders and back in breeding plumage.

Adults have long yellow legs and a bill that is long, thin, and dark. The bill is longer than the head and often has a slight upward curve. The body is grey-brown on top and white underneath; the neck and breast are streaked with dark brown. The rump is white. It ranges in length from 29 to 40 cm (11 to 16 in) and in weight from 111 to 250 g (3.9 to 8.8 oz). Wingspan is 23.6 in (60 cm).

The call is harsher, louder, and clearer than that of the lesser yellowlegs. They have a three-syllable whistle when flight-calling, with a lower pitched third syllable.

== Distribution and habitat ==
Their breeding habitat is bogs and marshes in the boreal forest region of Canada and Alaska. They migrate to the Atlantic and Pacific coasts of the United States, the Caribbean, and south to South America. This species also occurs in tidal pools, sewage ponds, and flooded field during migration. They are very rare vagrants to western Europe.

== Behaviour and ecology ==
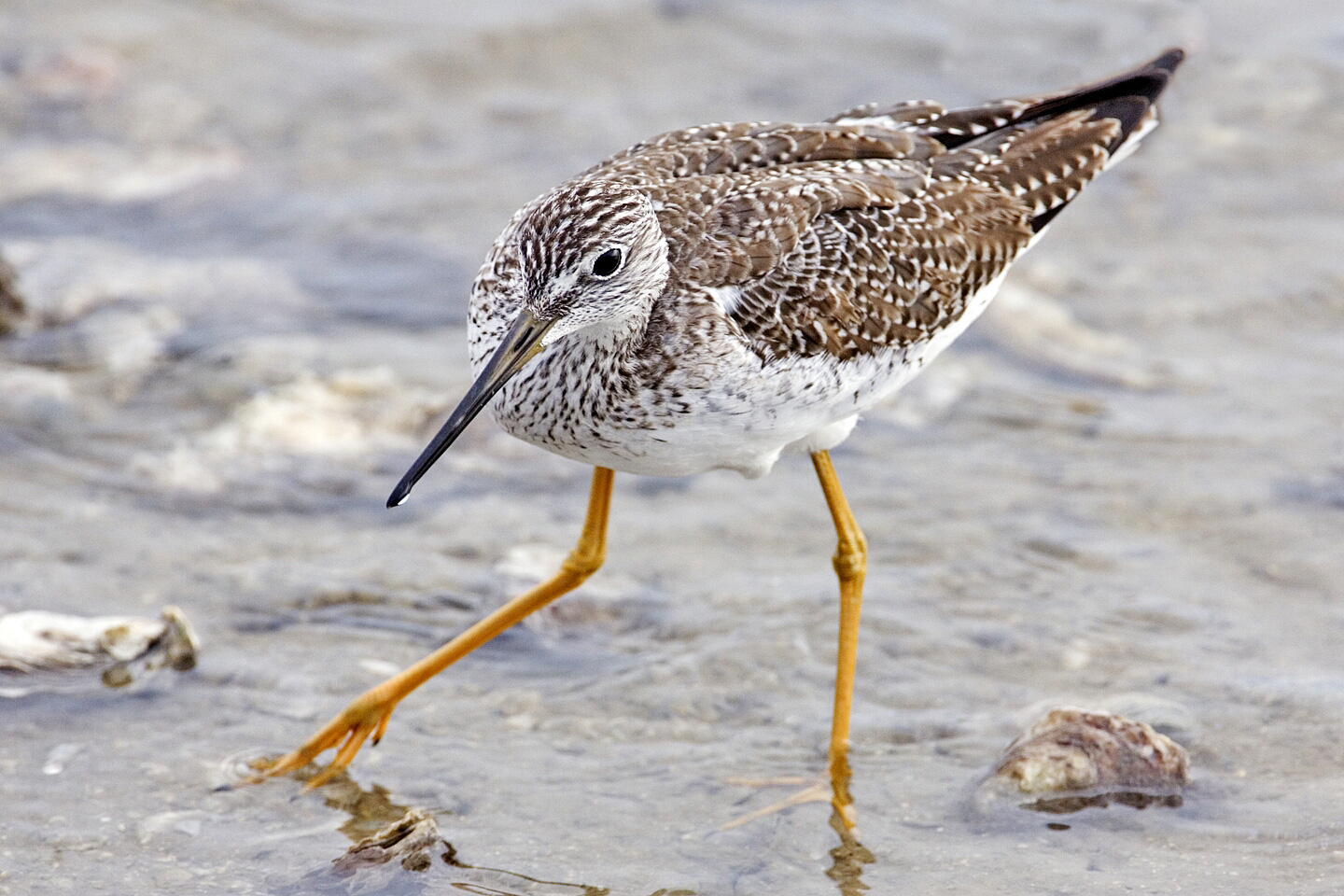
Juvenile

=== Breeding ===
They nest on the ground, usually in well-hidden locations near water. The three to four eggs average 49 mm (1.9 in) in length and 33 mm (1.3 in) in breadth and weigh about 28 g (0.99 oz). The incubation period is 23 days. The young leave the nest within 24 hours of hatching and then leave the vicinity of the nest within two days.

=== Food and feeding ===
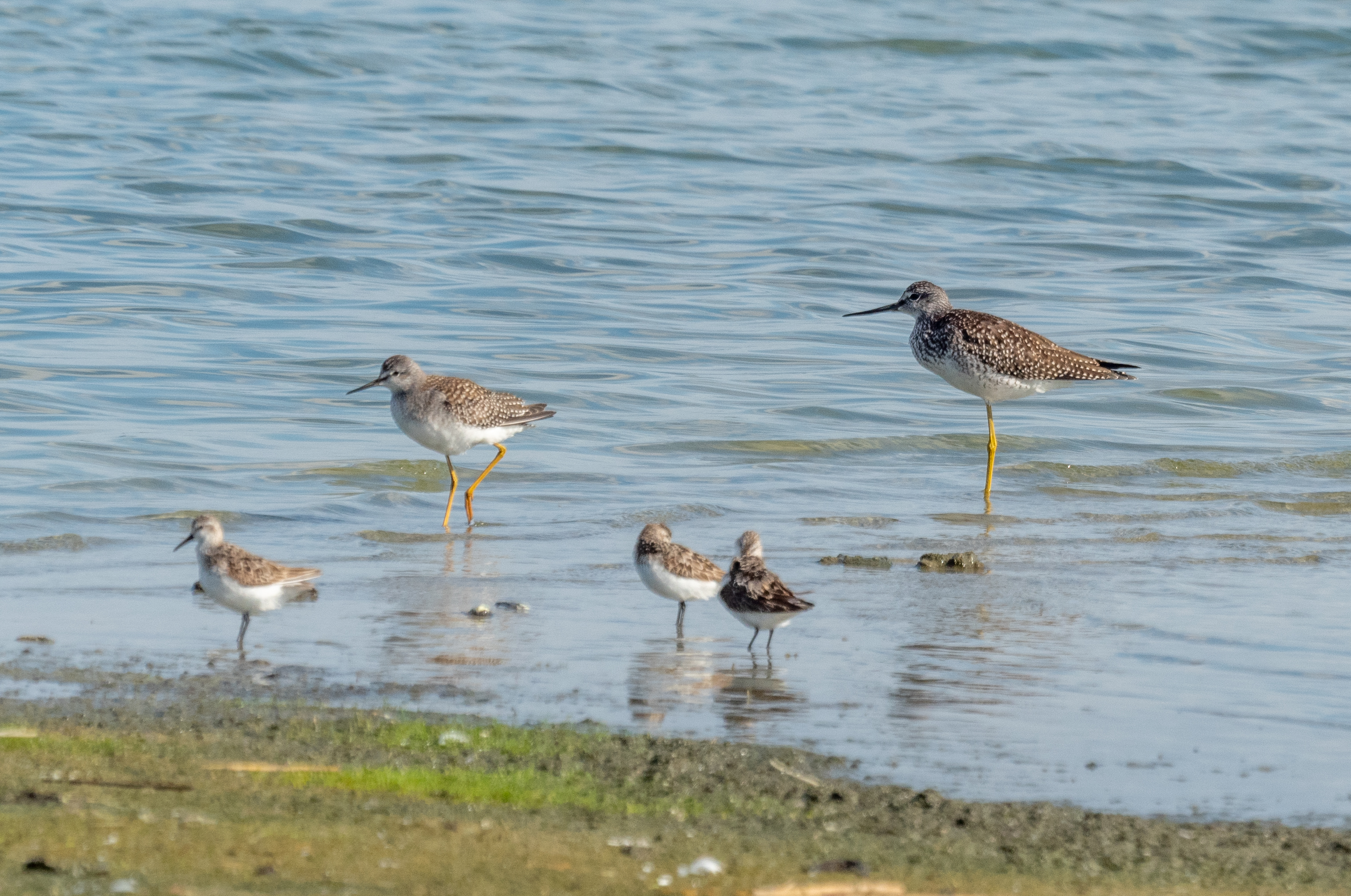
Greater yellowlegs (right) are larger, with a proportionally longer bill than lesser yellowlegs (left). Semipalmated sandpipers in the foreground.

These birds forage in shallow water, sometimes using their bills to stir up the water. They mainly eat insects and small fish, as well as crustaceans, marine worms, frogs, seeds and berries.
