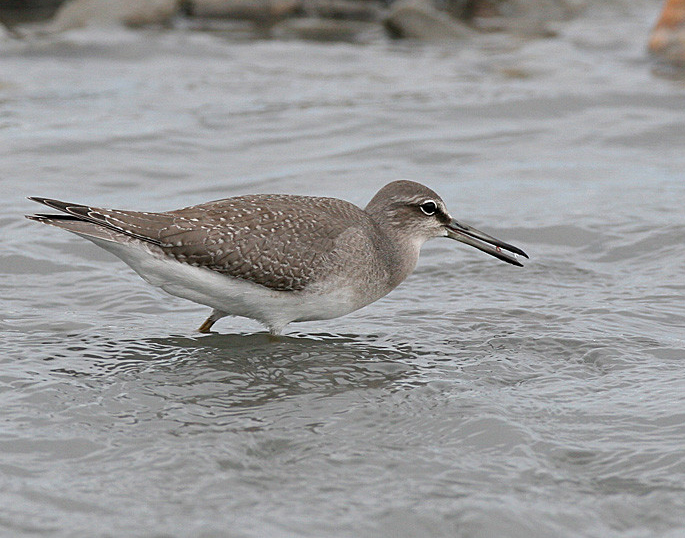
- Breeding plumage
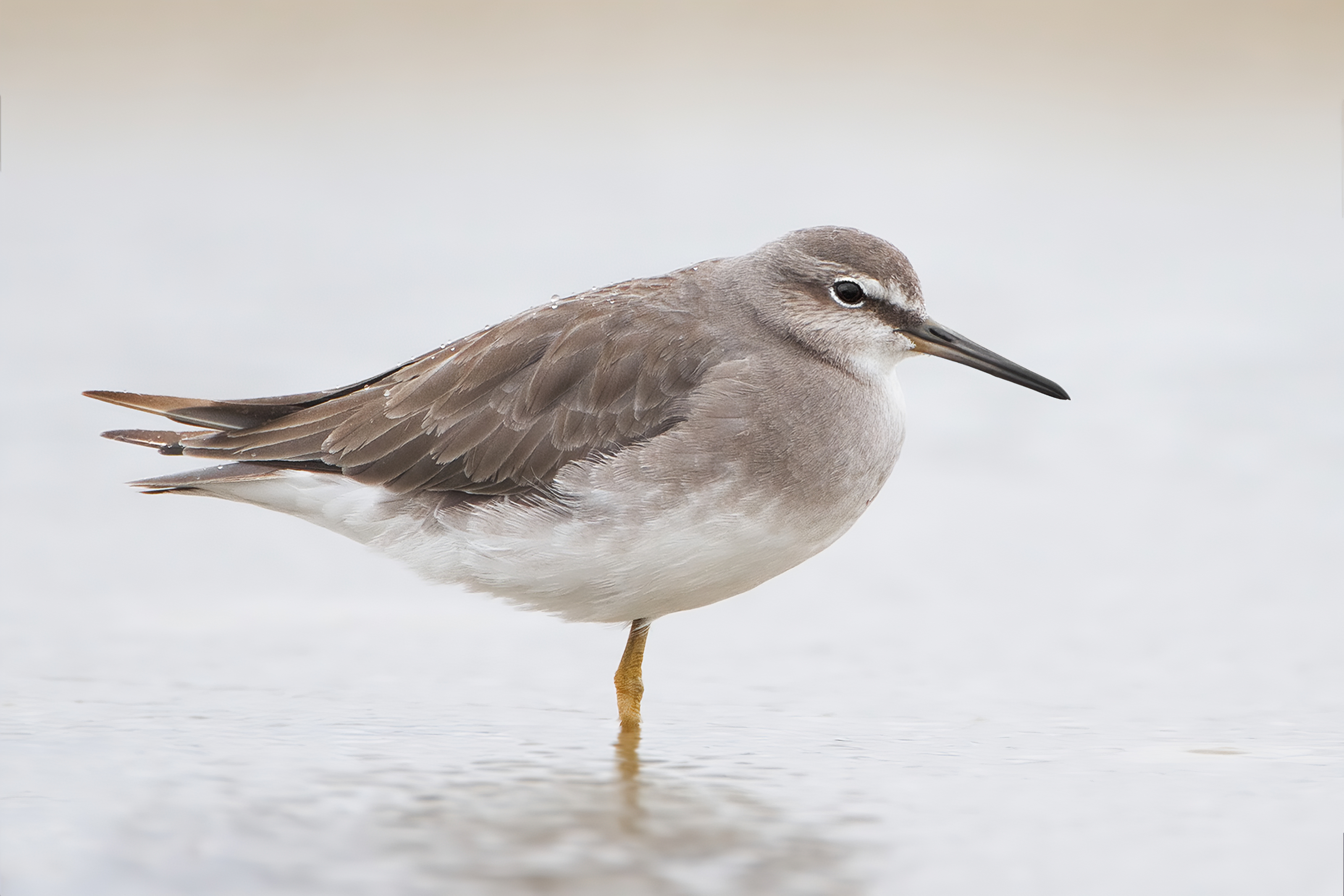
- Non-breeding plumage

Conservation status
- Near Threatened (IUCN 3.1)

Scientific classification
- Kingdom: Animalia
- Phylum: Chordata
- Class: Aves
- Order: Charadriiformes
- Family: Scolopacidae
- Genus: Tringa
- Species: T. brevipes

Binomial name
- Tringa brevipes (Vieillot, 1816)

Synonyms
- Heteroscelus brevipes Heterosceles brevipes Heteractitis brevipes

= Grey-tailed tattler =

Species of bird

The grey-tailed tattler (Tringa brevipes), also known as the Siberian tattler or Polynesian tattler, is a small shorebird in the genus Tringa. The English name for the tattlers refers to their noisy call. The genus name Tringa is the Neo-Latin name given to the green sandpiper by Aldrovandus in 1599 based on Ancient Greek trungas, a thrush-sized, white-rumped, tail-bobbing wading bird mentioned by Aristotle. The specific brevipes is from Latin brevis, "short", and pes, "foot".

This tattler breeds in northeast Siberia. After breeding, they migrate to an area from southeast Asia to Australia.

== Description ==
The grey-tailed tattler is closely related to its North American counterpart, the wandering tattler (T. incana) and is difficult to distinguish from that species. Both tattlers are unique among the species of Tringa for having unpatterned, greyish wings and back, and a scaly breast pattern extending more or less onto the belly in breeding plumage, in which both also have a rather prominent supercilium.

These birds resemble common redshanks in shape and size. The upper parts, underwings, face and neck are grey, and the belly is white. They have short yellowish legs and a bill with a pale base and dark tip. There is a weak supercilium.

They are very similar to their American counterpart, and differentiation depends on details like the length of the nasal groove and scaling on the tarsus. The best distinction is the call; grey-tailed has a disyllabic whistle, and wandering a rippling trill.

A grey-tailed tattler feeding on the shoreline in Redcliffe, SE Queensland, Australia

== Behaviour ==
Its breeding habitat is stony riverbeds in northeast Siberia. It nests on the ground, but these birds will perch in trees. They sometimes use old nests of other birds as well.

Grey-tailed tattlers are strongly migratory and winter on muddy and sandy coasts from southeast Asia to Australia. They are very rare vagrants to western North America and western Europe. These are not particularly gregarious birds and are seldom seen in large flocks except at roosts.

These birds forage on the ground or water, picking up food by sight. They eat insects, crustaceans and other invertebrates.

== Conservation status ==
=== Australia ===
Grey-tailed tattlers are not listed as "threatened" on the Australian Environment Protection and Biodiversity Conservation Act 1999.

The grey-tailed tattler is listed as "threatened" on the Victorian Flora and Fauna Guarantee Act (1988). Under this Act, an Action Statement for the recovery and future management of this species has not been prepared. On the 2007 advisory list of threatened vertebrate fauna in Victoria, the grey-tailed tattler is listed as critically endangered.
