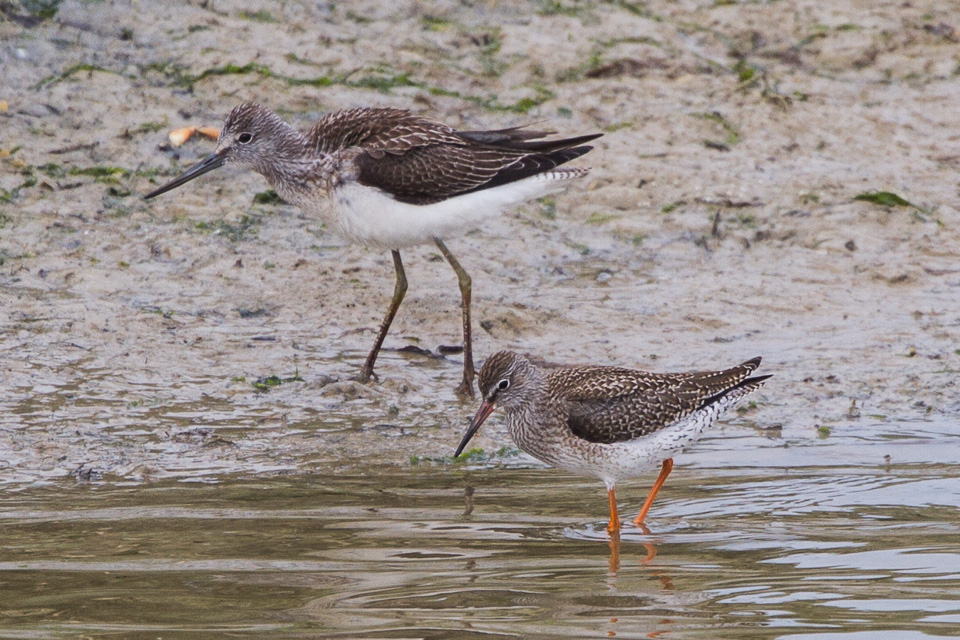
- Common greenshank (Tringa nebularia) and common redshank (Tringa totanus) at Cuckmere Haven, Sussex, England

Scientific classification
- Kingdom: Animalia
- Phylum: Chordata
- Class: Aves
- Order: Charadriiformes
- Family: Scolopacidae
- Genus: Tringa; Linnaeus, 1758

Type species
- Tringa ochropus (green sandpiper) Linnaeus, 1758

Species
- 13, see text

Synonyms
- Catatrophorus Jardine, 1849 (unjustified emendation); Catoptophorus Des Murs, 1854 (unjustified emendation); Catoptrophonus Gray, 1871 (unjustified emendation); Catoptrophorus Bonaparte, 1827; Catorthrophorus Brehm, 1855 (unjustified emendation); Catroptophorus Giebel, 1877 (unjustified emendation); Helodromas; Heteroscelus Baird, 1858; Pseudototanus; Rhyacophilus Kaup, 1829; Rhyacophorus Bonaparte, 1842 (unjustified emendation); Rhyacophylus Lillo, 1905 (unjustified emendation); Rhynchophilus Bonaparte, 1856 (unjustified emendation); Rhyncophilus Des Murs, 1854 (unjustified emendation); Rhyocophilus Bonaparte, 1854 (unjustified emendation); Totanus Bechstein, 1803; Trynga Möhring, 1758 (suppressed)

= Tringa =

Genus of birds

Tringa is a genus of waders, containing the shanks and tattlers. The genus name Tringa is the Neo-Latin name given to the green sandpiper by the Italian naturalist Ulisse Aldrovandi in 1599. They are mainly freshwater birds, often with brightly coloured legs as reflected in the English names of six species, as well as the specific names of two of these and the green sandpiper. They are typically associated with northern hemisphere temperate regions for breeding. Some of this group—notably the green sandpiper and the solitary sandpiper—nest in trees, using the old nests of other birds, usually thrushes.

The willet and the tattlers have been found to belong in Tringa; these genus changes were formally adopted by the American Ornithologists' Union in 2006.

The present genus in the old, more limited sense was even further subdivided into Tringa proper and Totanus, either as subgenera or as full genera. The available DNA sequence data suggests however that neither of these is monophyletic and that the latter simply lumps together a number of more or less closely related apomorphic species. Totanus is not therefore now accepted even as a subgenus.

== Taxonomy ==
The genus Tringa was introduced in 1758 by the Swedish naturalist Carl Linnaeus in the tenth edition of his Systema Naturae. The name Tringa is the Neo-Latin name given to the green sandpiper by the Italian naturalist Ulisse Aldrovandi in 1603 based on Ancient Greek trungas, a thrush-sized, white-rumped, tail-bobbing wading bird mentioned by Aristotle. The type species is the green sandpiper (Tringa ochropus).

=== Species ===
The genus contains 13 species.

Genus Tringa – Linnaeus, 1758 – thirteen species
Common name	Scientific name and subspecies	Range	Size and ecology	IUCN status and estimated population
Green sandpiper	Tringa ochropus (Linnaeus, 1758)	Breeding across northern Europe and northern Asia, wintering in western and southern Europe, the Indian Subcontinent, Southeast Asia, and tropical Africa.	Size: Habitat: Diet:	LC
Solitary sandpiper	Tringa solitaria (Wilson, 1813) Two subspecies: T. s. cinnamomea, (Brewster, 1890); T. s. solitaria, (Wilson, 1813)	Breeding across Alaska and Canada, wintering in Central and South America, especially in the Amazon River basin, and the Caribbean.	Size: Habitat: Diet:	LC
Grey-tailed tattler	Tringa brevipes (Vieillot, 1816)	Breeding in northeast Asia, wintering southeast Asia to Australia.	Size: Habitat: Diet:	NT
Wandering tattler	Tringa incana (Gmelin, JF, 1789)	Breeding in Alaska and northwestern Canada, wintering on the Pacific coast of the Americas from the California coast south to northern Chile, and Pacific islands.	Size: Habitat: Diet:	LC
Spotted redshank	Tringa erythropus (Pallas, 1764)	Breeding in the Arctic across much of the Palearctic, from Lapland in the west to Chukotskaya in the east, wintering in western Europe, Africa and southern Asia	Size: Habitat: Diet:	LC
Greater yellowlegs	Tringa melanoleuca (Gmelin, JF, 1789)	Breeding in subarctic Canada and Alaska. Wintering on the Atlantic and Pacific coasts of the United States, the Caribbean, and south to South America.	Size: Habitat: Diet:	NT
Common greenshank	Tringa nebularia (Gunnerus, 1767)	Breeding from northern Scotland eastwards across northern Europe and east across Asia; wintering in western Europe, Africa, southern Asia and Australia	Size: Habitat: Diet:	LC
Willet	Tringa semipalmata (Gmelin, JF, 1789) Two subspecies: T. s. semipalmata eastern willet; T. s. inornata western willet	Breeding in temperate North America, wintering on coasts of North America	Size: Habitat: Diet:	LC
Lesser yellowlegs	Tringa flavipes (Gmelin, JF, 1789)	Breeding in arctic and subarctic North America; wintering on the Gulf coast of the United States, the Caribbean, and south to South America	Size: Habitat: Diet:	VU
Nordmann's greenshank	Tringa guttifer (Nordmann, 1835)	Breeding in eastern Russia along the south-western and northern coasts of the Sea of Okhotsk and on Sakhalin Island; on passage in South Korea, mainland China, Hong Kong, and Taiwan, wintering in Bangladesh, Thailand, Cambodia, Vietnam and Peninsular Malaysia.	Size: Habitat: Diet:	EN
Marsh sandpiper	Tringa stagnatilis (Bechstein, 1803)	Breeding in eastern temperate Europe and across temperate Asia, wintering in Africa, India, southeastern Asia and Australia.	Size: Habitat: Diet:	LC
Common redshank	Tringa totanus (Linnaeus, 1758) Six subspecies: T. t. robusta (Schiøler, 1919); T. t. totanus (Linnaeus, 1758); T. t. ussuriensis Buturlin, 1934; T. t. terrignotae Meinertzhagen, R. & Meinertzhagen, A., 1926; T. t. craggi Hale, 1971; T. t. eurhina (Oberholser, 1900)	Breeding across temperate Eurasia, wintering in western and southern Europe, Africa, and southern Asia.	Size: Habitat: Diet:	LC
Wood sandpiper	Tringa glareola Linnaeus, 1758	Breeding in cool temperate taiga from the Scottish Highlands in the west, east across Eurasia and the Palearctic, wintering in Africa, South Asia (particularly India) and Australia.	Size: Habitat: Diet:	LC

== Systematics and evolution ==
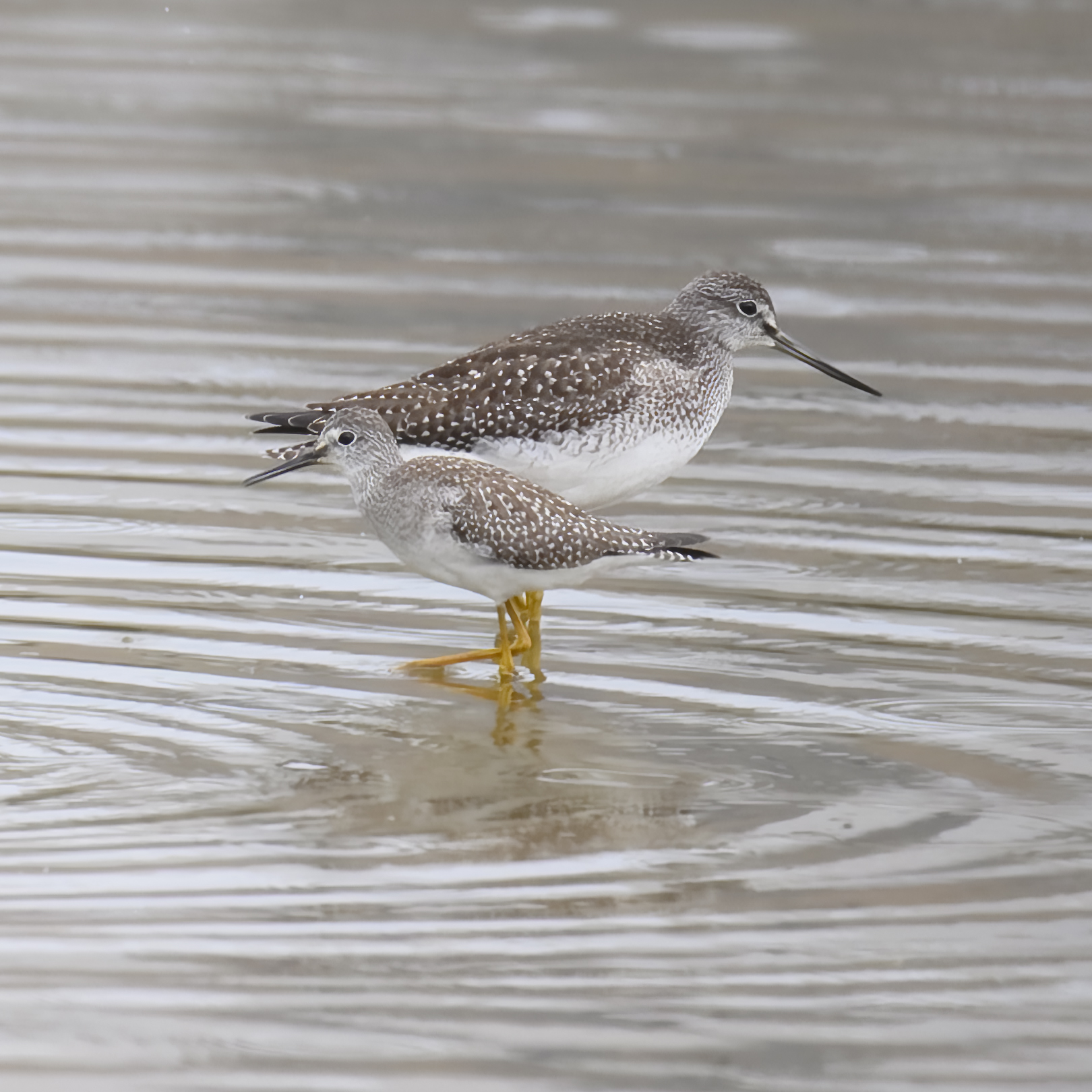
Lesser yellowlegs (T. flavipes, front) and greater yellowlegs (T. melanoleuca, behind) together, showing the difference in size

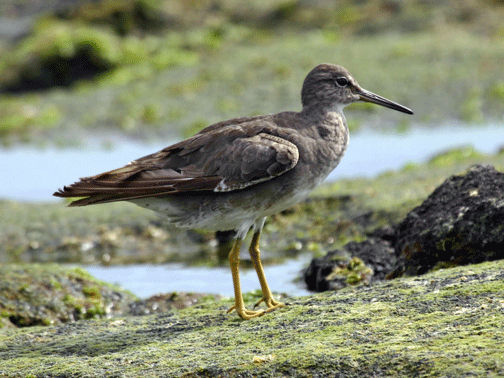
Wandering tattler (Tringa incana), formerly in Heteroscelus

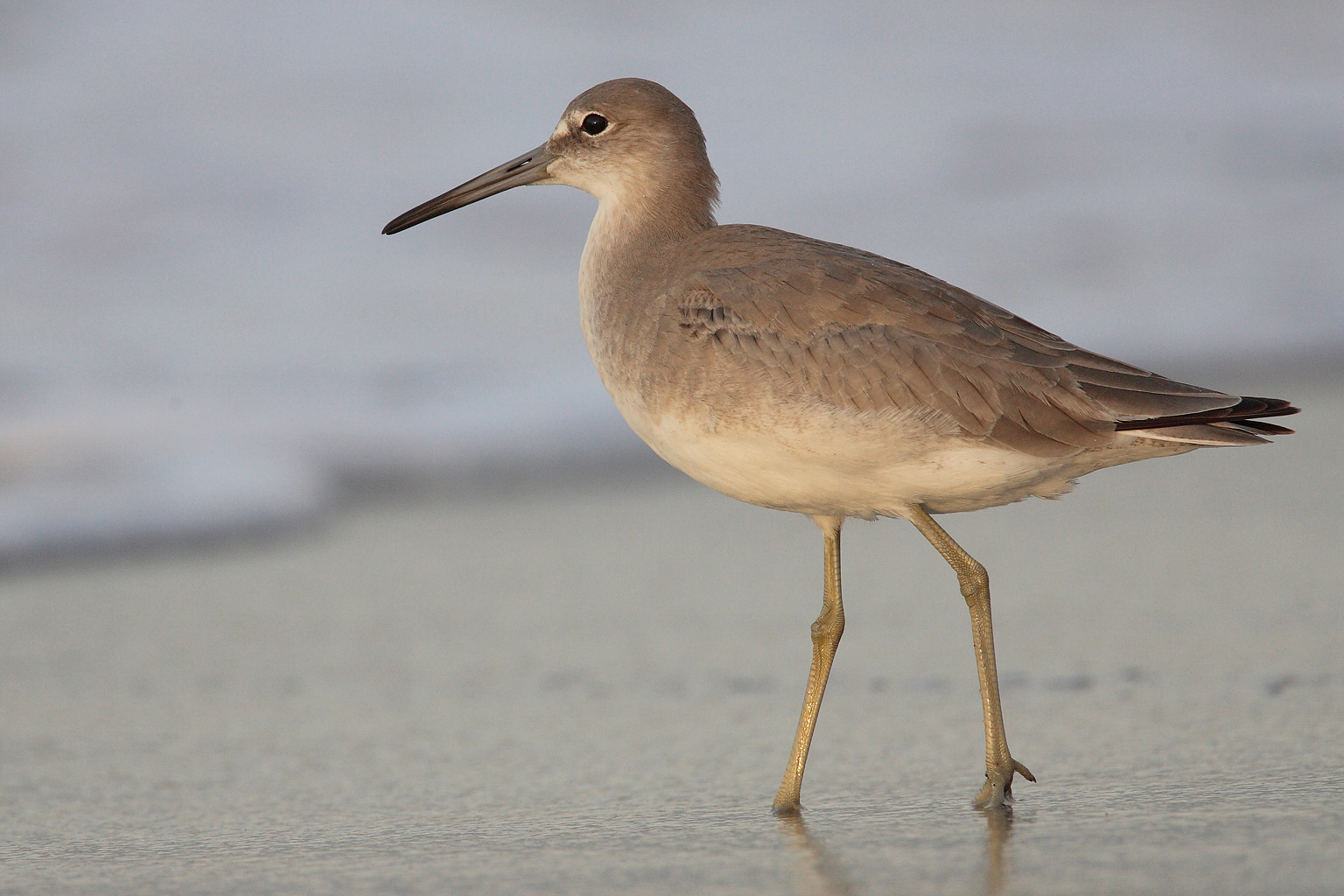
Willet (Tringa semipalmata), formerly in monotypic Catoptrophorus

The shanks' and tattlers' closest relatives are sandpipers of the genera Actitis and Xenus. Together with these, they are related to the phalaropes, as well as the turnstones and calidrids. The large genus Tringa and the two very small genera which are most closely related form a phylogeny similar to the situation found in many other shorebird lineages such as calidrids, snipes and woodcocks, or gulls.

The same study has indicated that some morphological characters such as details of the furcula and pelvis have evolved convergently and are no indicators of close relationship. Similarly, the leg/foot color wildly varies between close relatives, with the spotted redshank, the greater yellowlegs, and the common greenshank for example being more closely related among each other than to any other species in the group; the ancestral coloration of the legs and feet was fairly certainly drab buffish as in e.g. the green sandpiper. On the other hand, the molecular phylogeny reveals that the general habitus and size as well as the overall plumage pattern are good indicators of an evolutionary relationship in this group.

The Nordmann's greenshank, a rare and endangered species, was not available for molecular analyses. It is fairly aberrant and was formerly placed in the monotypic genus Pseudototanus. It appears closest overall to the semipalmata-flavipes and the stagnatilis-totanus-glareola groups, though it also has some similarities to the greater yellowlegs and common greenshank.

=== Fossil record ===
Fossil shanks are known since the Miocene, possibly even since the Eo-/Oligocene some 33–30 million years ago (mya) which would be far earlier than most extant genera of birds. However, it is uncertain whether Tringa edwardsi indeed belongs into the present-day genus or is a distinct, ancestral form. The time of the Tringa-Actitis-Xenus-Phalaropus divergence has been tentatively dated at 22 mya, the beginning of the Miocene; even if the dating is largely conjectural, it suggests that T. edwardsi does indeed not belong into the modern genus. Molecular dating—which is not too reliable, however—indicates that the diversification into the known lineages occurred between 20 and 5 mya. The fossil record contains species formerly separated in Totanus from the Early Miocene onwards. Although these are usually known from very scant remains, the fact that apparently apomorphic Tringa as well as a putative phalarope are known from about 23–22 mya indicates that the shank-phalarope group had already diverged into the modern genera by the start of the Miocene. The biogeography of living and fossil species—notably, the rarity of the latter in well-researched North American sites—seems to suggest that Tringa originated in Eurasia. Time and place neatly coincide with the disappearance of the last vestiges of the Turgai Sea, and this process may well have been a major factor in the separation of the genera in the shank-phalarope clade. Still, scolopacids are very similar osteologically, and many of the early fossils of presumed shanks require revaluation.

- ?Tringa edwardsi (Quercy Late Eocene/Early Oligocene of Mouillac, France)
- ?Tringa gracilis (Early Miocene of WC Europe) – calidrid?
- ?Tringa lartetianus (Early Miocene of Saint-Gérand-le-Puy, France)
- Tringa spp. (Early Miocene of Ravolzhausen, Germany – Early Pleistocene of Europe)
- ?Tringa grivensis (Middle Miocene of Grive-Saint-Alban, France)
- ?Tringa majori (Middle Miocene of Grive-Saint-Alban, France)
- ?Tringa minor (Middle Miocene of Grive-Saint-Alban, France) – includes "Erolia" ennouchii; calidriid?
- ?Tringa grigorescui (Middle Miocene of Ciobăniţa, Romania)
- ?Tringa scarabellii (Late Miocene of Senigallia, Italy)
- Tringa sp. 1 (Late Miocene/Early Pliocene of Lee Creek Mine, US)
- Tringa sp. 2 (Late Miocene/Early Pliocene of Lee Creek Mine, US)
- ?Tringa numenioides (Early Pliocene of Odesa, Ukraine)
- Tringa antiqua (Late Pliocene of Meade County, US)
- Tringa ameghini (Late Pleistocene of Talara Tar Seeps, Peru)

"Tringa" hoffmanni is now in Ludiortyx. While its relationships are disputed, it was not a charadriiform.

== See also ==
- Hybridisation in shorebirds
