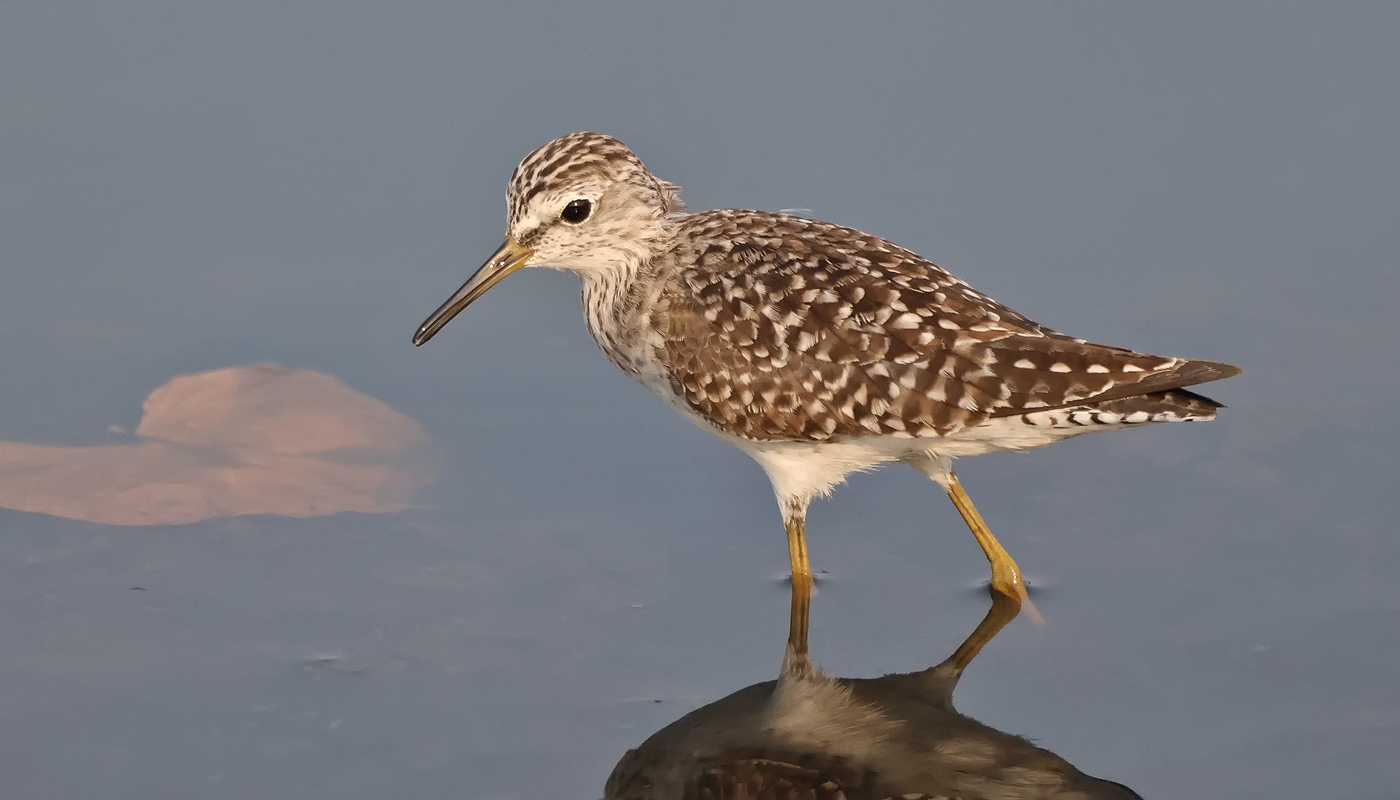
- Seen in Kannur, Kerala

Conservation status
- Least Concern (IUCN 3.1)

Scientific classification
- Kingdom: Animalia
- Phylum: Chordata
- Class: Aves
- Order: Charadriiformes
- Family: Scolopacidae
- Genus: Tringa
- Species: T. ochropus

Binomial name
- Tringa ochropus Linnaeus, 1758
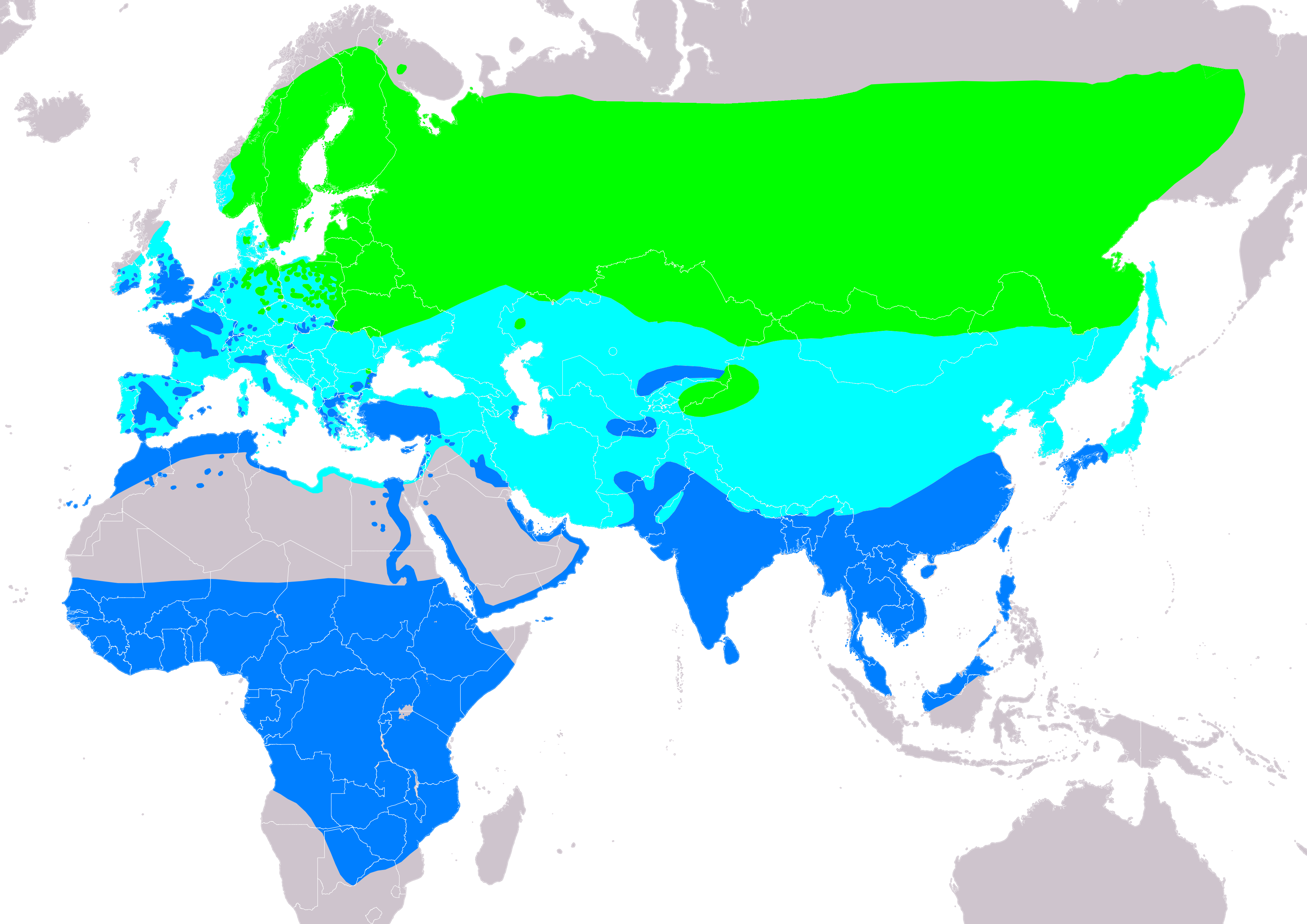
- Range of T. ochropus Breeding Passage Non-breeding

= Green sandpiper =

Species of bird

The green sandpiper (Tringa ochropus) is a small wader (shorebird) of the Old World.

The green sandpiper represents an ancient lineage of the genus Tringa; its only close living relative is the solitary sandpiper (T. solitaria). They both have brown wings with little light dots and a delicate but contrasting neck and chest pattern. In addition, both species nest in trees, unlike most other scolopacids.

Given its basal position in Tringa, it is fairly unsurprising that suspected cases of hybridisation between this species and the common sandpiper (A. hypoleucos) of the sister genus Actitis have been reported.

== Taxonomy ==
The green sandpiper was formally described by the Swedish naturalist Carl Linnaeus in 1758 in the tenth edition of his Systema Naturae under the current binomial name Tringa ochropus. The genus name Tringa is the Neo-Latin name given to the green sandpiper by Aldrovandus in 1599 based on Ancient Greek trungas, a thrush-sized, white-rumped, tail-bobbing wading bird mentioned by Aristotle. The specific ochropus is from Ancient Greek okhros, "ochre", and pous, "foot". The species is monotypic: no subspecies are recognised.

== Description ==
This species is a somewhat plump wader with a dark greenish-brown back and wings, greyish head and breast and otherwise white underparts. The back is spotted white to varying extents, being maximal in the breeding adult, and less in winter and young birds. The legs and short bill are both dark green.

It is conspicuous and characteristically patterned in flight, with the wings dark above and below and a brilliant white rump. The latter feature reliably distinguishes it from the slightly smaller but otherwise very similar solitary sandpiper (T. solitaria) of North America.

In flight it has a characteristic three-note whistle.

== Distribution and migration ==
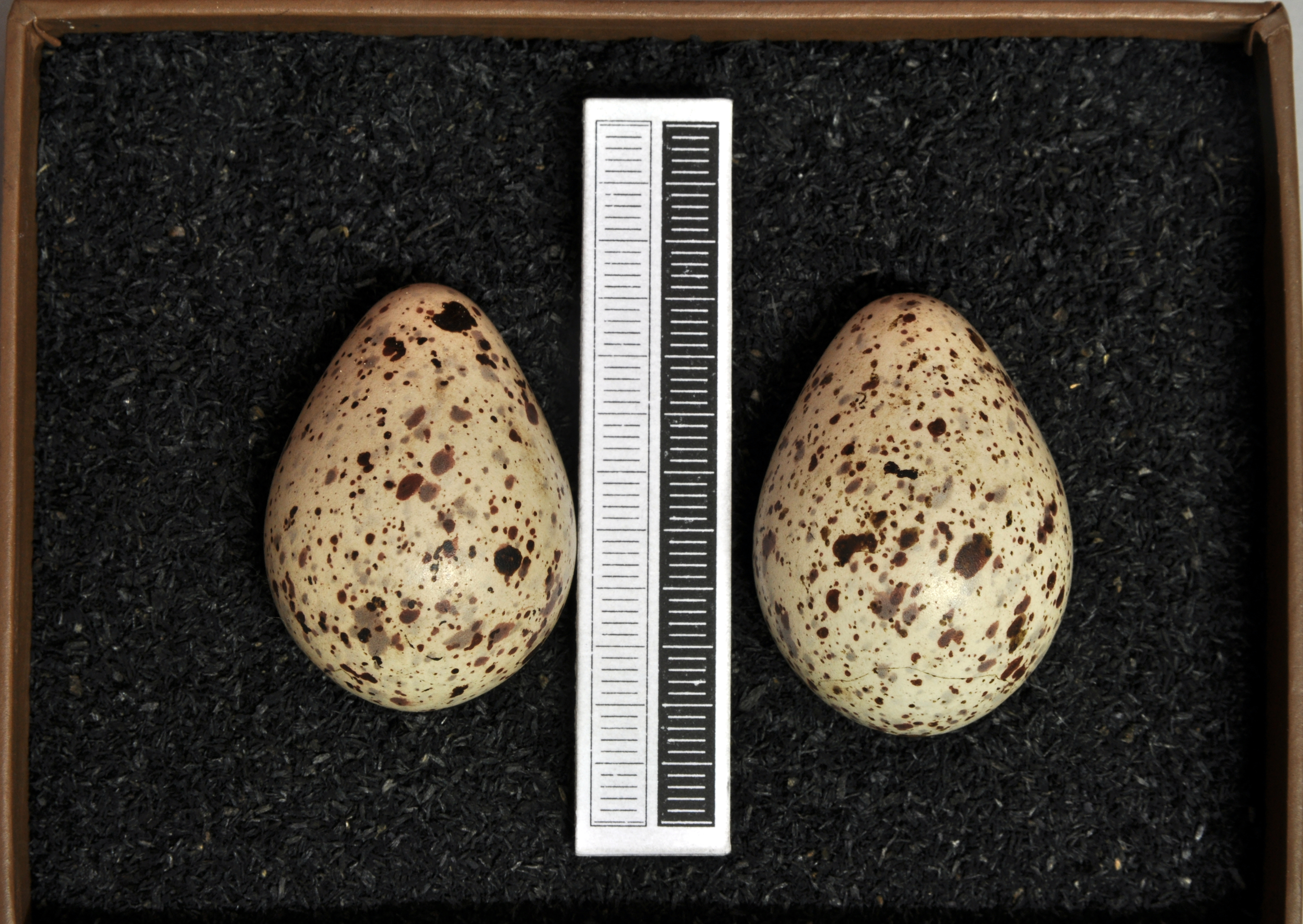
Eggs, Museum Wiesbaden

The green sandpiper breeds across subarctic Europe and east across the Palearctic and is a migratory bird, wintering in southern Europe, the Indian subcontinent, Southeast Asia, and tropical Africa. Food is small invertebrate items picked off the mud as this species works steadily around the edges of its chosen pond.

This is not a gregarious species, although sometimes small numbers congregate in suitable feeding areas. Green sandpiper is very much a bird of freshwater, and is often found in sites too restricted for other waders, which tend to like a clear all-round view.

== Breeding ==
It lays 2–4 eggs in an old tree nest of another species, such as a fieldfare (Turdus pilaris). The clutch takes about three weeks to hatch.

== Status ==
Widely distributed and not uncommon, the green sandpiper is not considered a threatened species by the IUCN on a global scale. It is one of the species to which the Agreement on the Conservation of African-Eurasian Migratory Waterbirds (AEWA) applies.

== Gallery ==
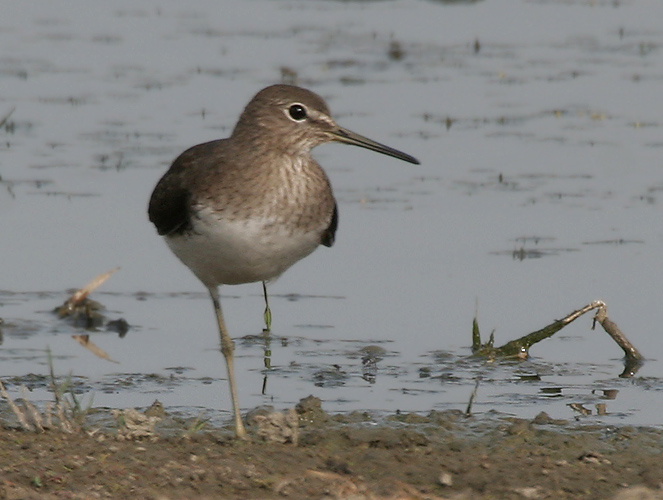
Wintering adult, Haryana, India

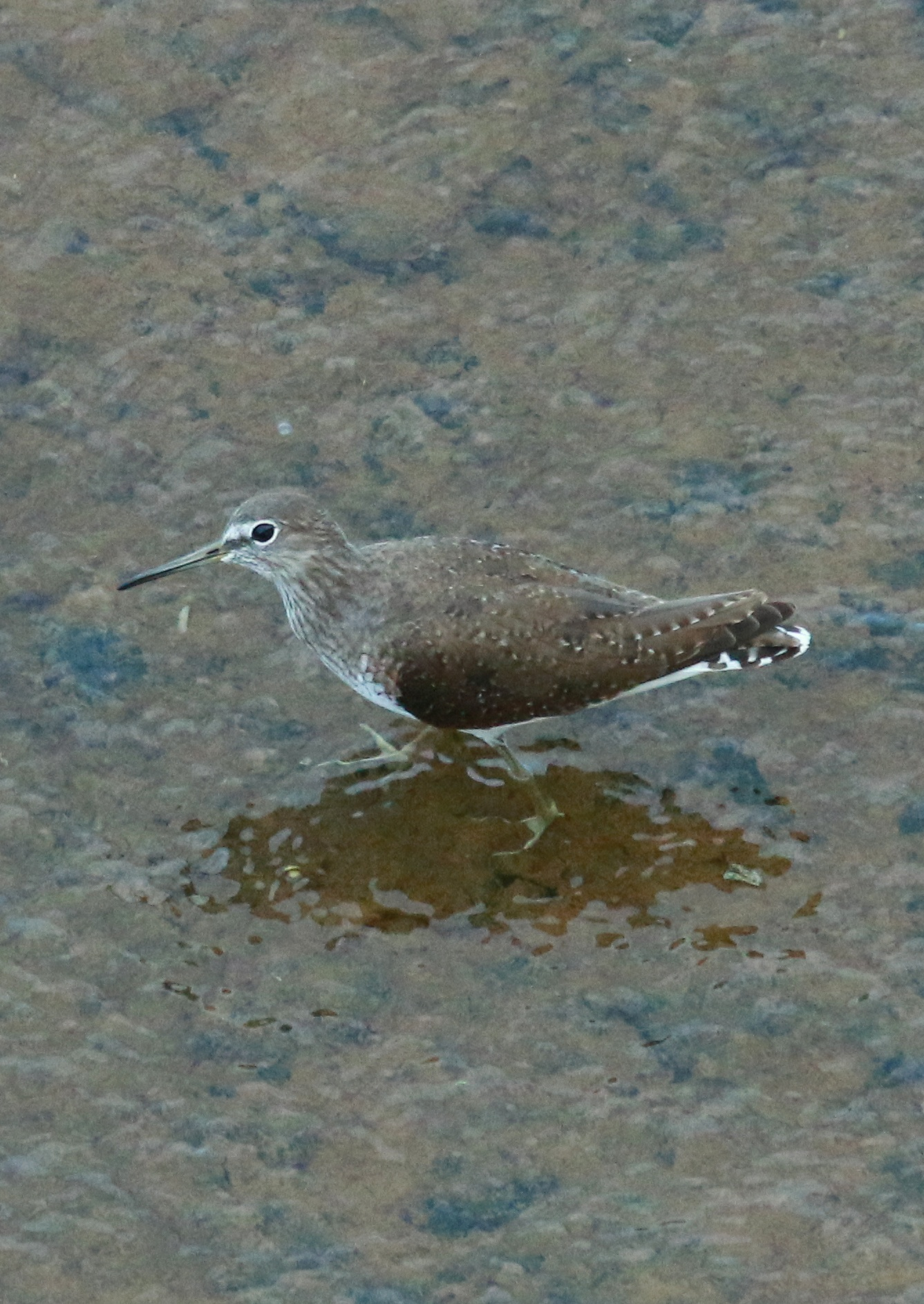
Wintering adult, Kerala, India

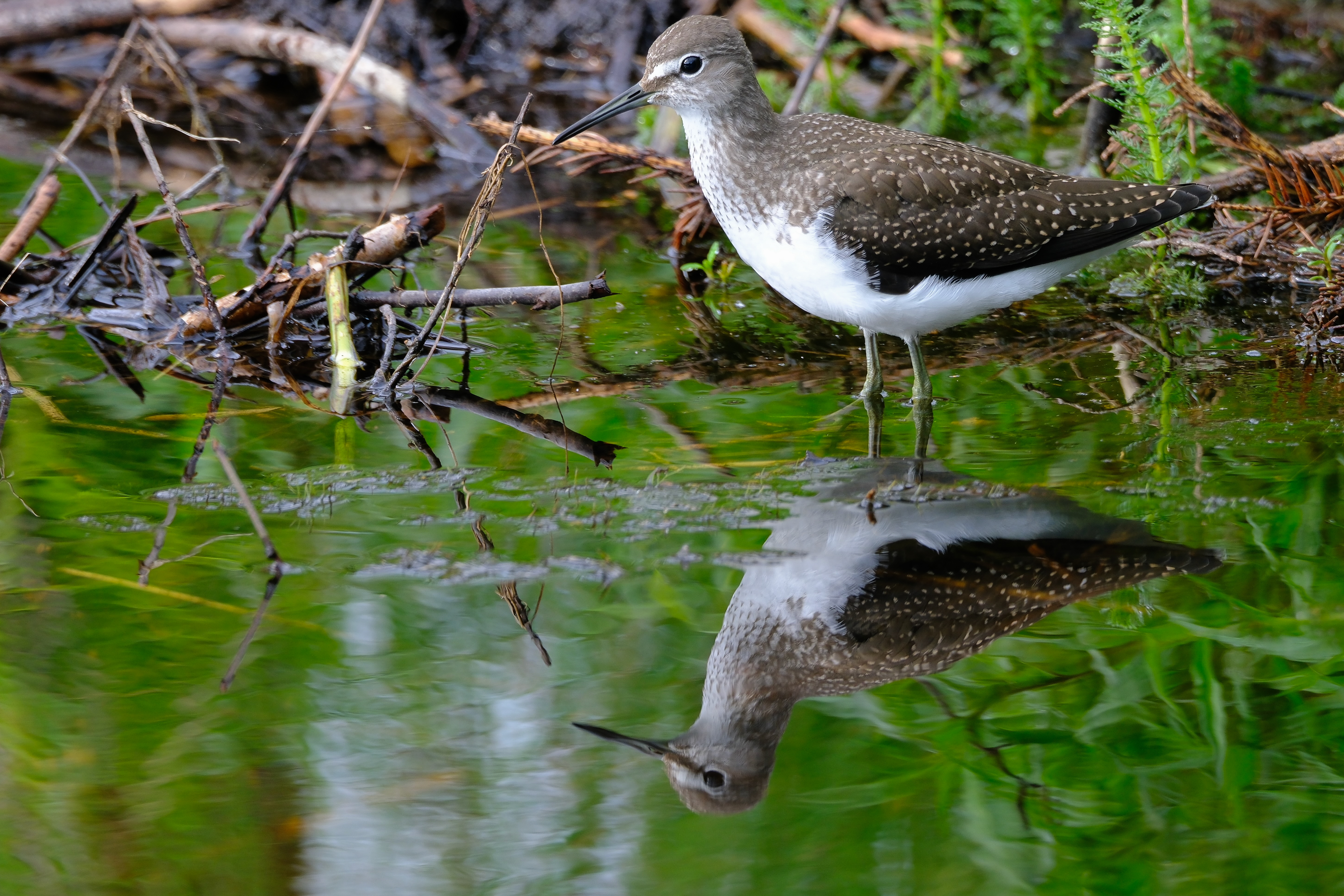
Adult wading in Bavaria, Germany
