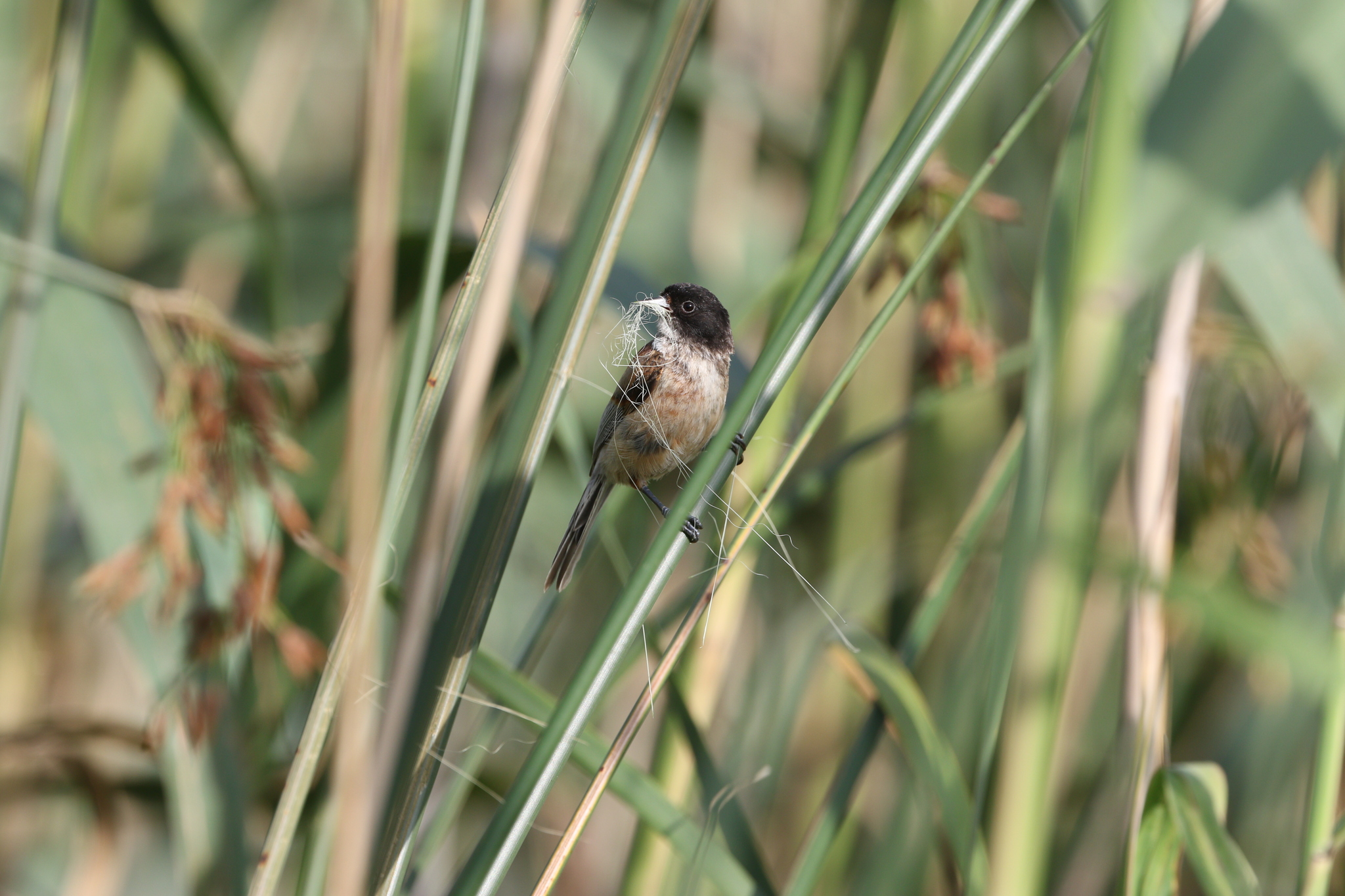

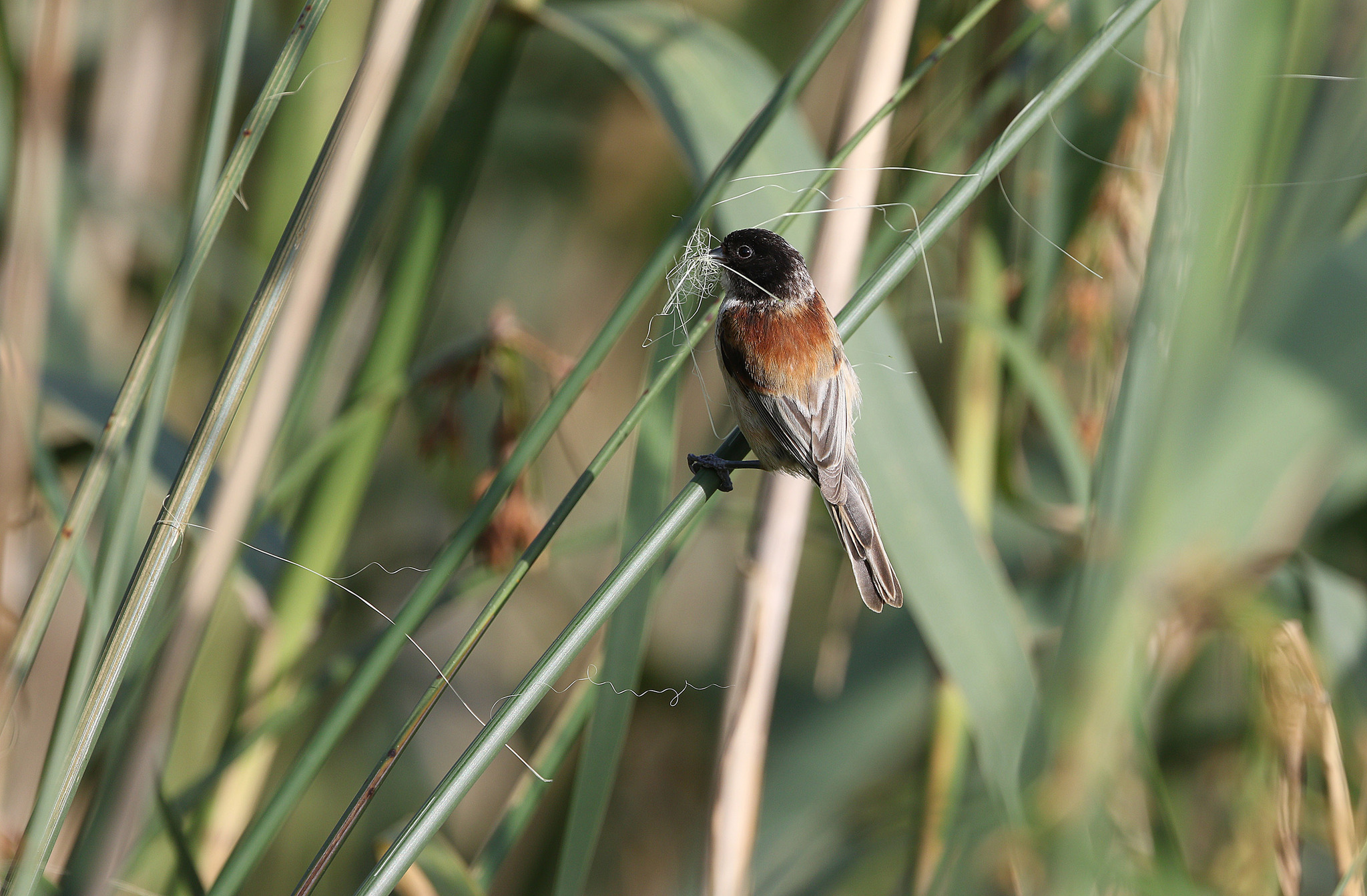

Conservation status
- Least Concern (IUCN 3.1)

Scientific classification
- Kingdom: Animalia
- Phylum: Chordata
- Class: Aves
- Order: Passeriformes
- Family: Remizidae
- Genus: Remiz
- Species: R. macronyx

Binomial name
- Remiz macronyx (Severtzov, 1873)
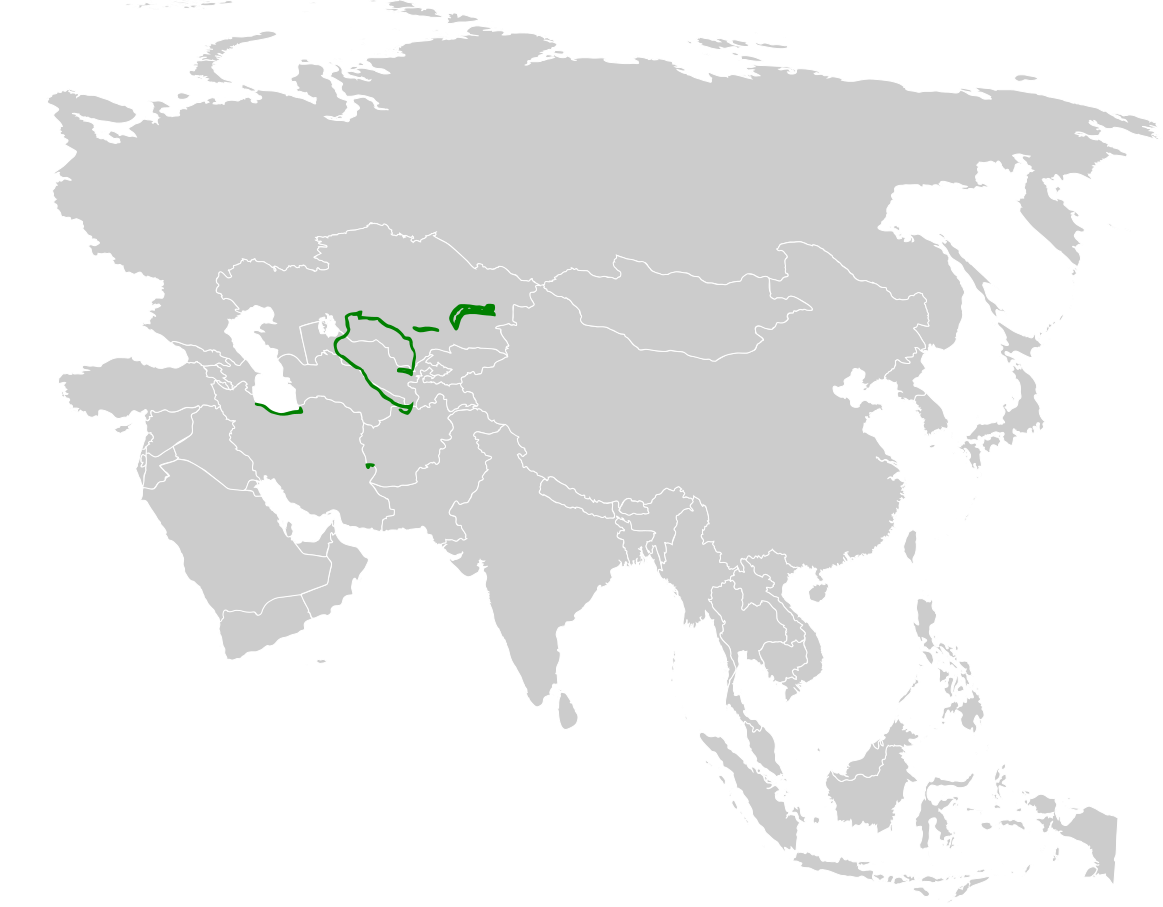

Synonyms
- Remiz pendulinus

= Black-headed penduline tit =

Species of bird

The black-headed penduline tit (Remiz macronyx) is a species of bird in the family Remizidae, found in Central Asia in reed beds along lakes or rivers. Its distribution is fragmented.

It is the least thoroughly-documented bird in the Remiz genus, and has been described as one of the most poorly-known birds in Central Asia.

== Diet ==
It is omnivorous.

== Taxonomy ==
Four subspecies are recognised:

- Remiz macronyx macronyx (Severtsov, 1873) – southwest Kazakhstan, Uzbekistan, north & southeast Turkmenistan, Tajikistan, and northeast Afghanistan.
- Remiz macronyx neglectus (Zarudny, 1908) – north Iran and south Turkmenistan. Its males typically have heads more fully covered in black plumage, with fewer traces of the chestnut seen in other subspecies.
- Remiz macronyx nigricans (Zarudny, 1908) – southeast Iran and southwest Afghanistan. It is generally believed to have gone extinct. It had a dark head and a chestnut body.
- Remiz macronyx ssaposhnikowi (Johansen, HE, 1907) – southeast Kazakhstan

The IUCN considers R. macronyx to be a synonym of Remiz pendulinus, the Eurasian penduline tit.
