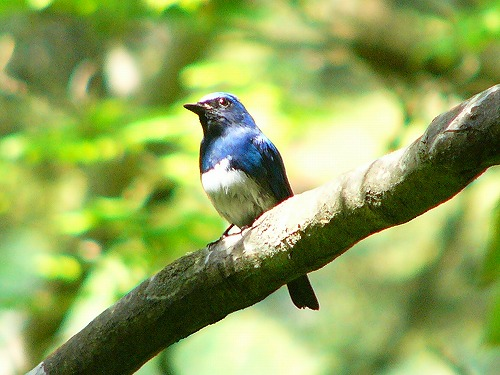
- Blue-and-white flycatcher (Cyanoptila cyanomelana)

Scientific classification
- Kingdom: Animalia
- Phylum: Chordata
- Class: Aves
- Order: Passeriformes
- Family: Muscicapidae
- Genus: Cyanoptila; Blyth, 1847

Type species
- Muscicapa cyanomelana Temminck, 1829

= Cyanoptila =

Genus of birds

Cyanoptila is a genus of passerine birds in the Old World flycatcher family Muscicapidae.

Cyanoptila comes from Ancient Greek: "kuanos" meaning dark-blue; and "ptilon" – plumage.

The genus Cyanoptila contains the following two species:

Image	Common name	Scientific name
	Blue-and-white flycatcher	Cyanoptila cyanomelana
	Zappey's flycatcher	Cyanoptila cumatilis
