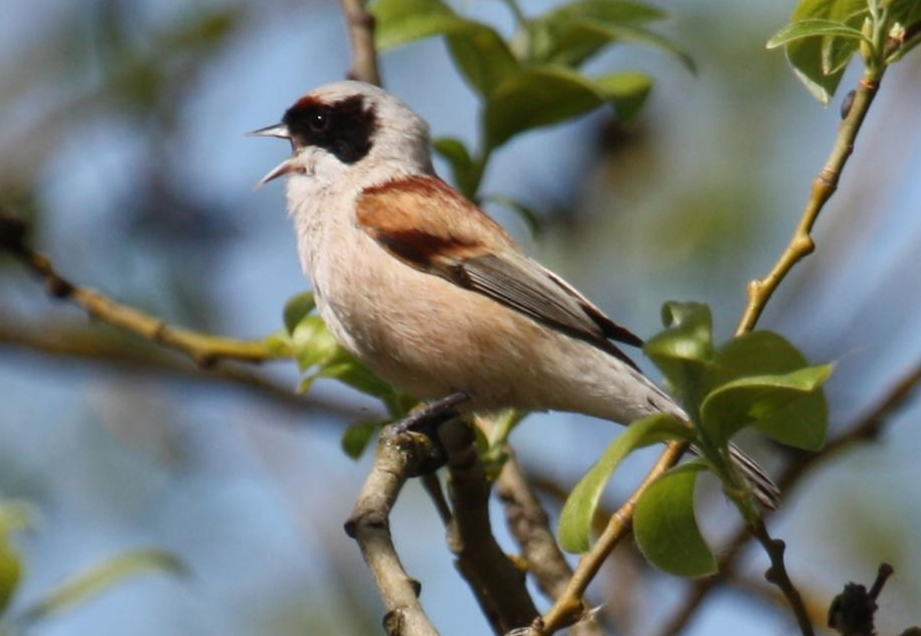
- Eurasian penduline tit

Scientific classification
- Kingdom: Animalia
- Phylum: Chordata
- Class: Aves
- Order: Passeriformes
- Family: Remizidae
- Genus: Remiz; Jarocki, 1819

Type species
- Motacilla pendulinus (Eurasian penduline tit) Linnaeus, 1758

Species
- 4, see text

Synonyms
- Remiza Stejneger, 1887; Remizus Pražák, 1897

= Remiz =

Genus of birds

Remiz is a genus of birds in the family Remizidae, commonly known as the Eurasian pendulines (in contrast to the African pendulines). Like other penduline tits, they are named for their elegant, pendulous nests.

== Taxonomy ==
The genus Remiz was introduced in 1819 by the Polish zoologist Feliks Paweł Jarocki to accommodate a single species, the Eurasian penduline tit. The name Remiz is the Polish word for the Eurasian penduline tit.

The genus contains the following four species:

Image	Common name	Scientific name	Distribution
	Eurasian penduline tit	Remiz pendulinus	Western Europe to Morocco
	Black-headed penduline tit	Remiz macronyx	Central Asia.
	Chinese penduline tit	Remiz consobrinus	Manchuria; winters sparsely across East Asia
	White-crowned penduline tit	Remiz coronatus	Afghanistan, China, India, Kazakhstan, Mongolia, Pakistan, Russia, and Tajikistan.

The cladogram below is based on a phylogenetic study by Hui Wang and collaborators that was published in 2025.

- Remiz
  - Chinese penduline tit – Remiz consobrinus
  - - White-crowned penduline tit – Remiz coronatus
    - - Black-headed penduline tit – Remiz macronyx
      - Eurasian penduline tit – Remiz pendulinus
