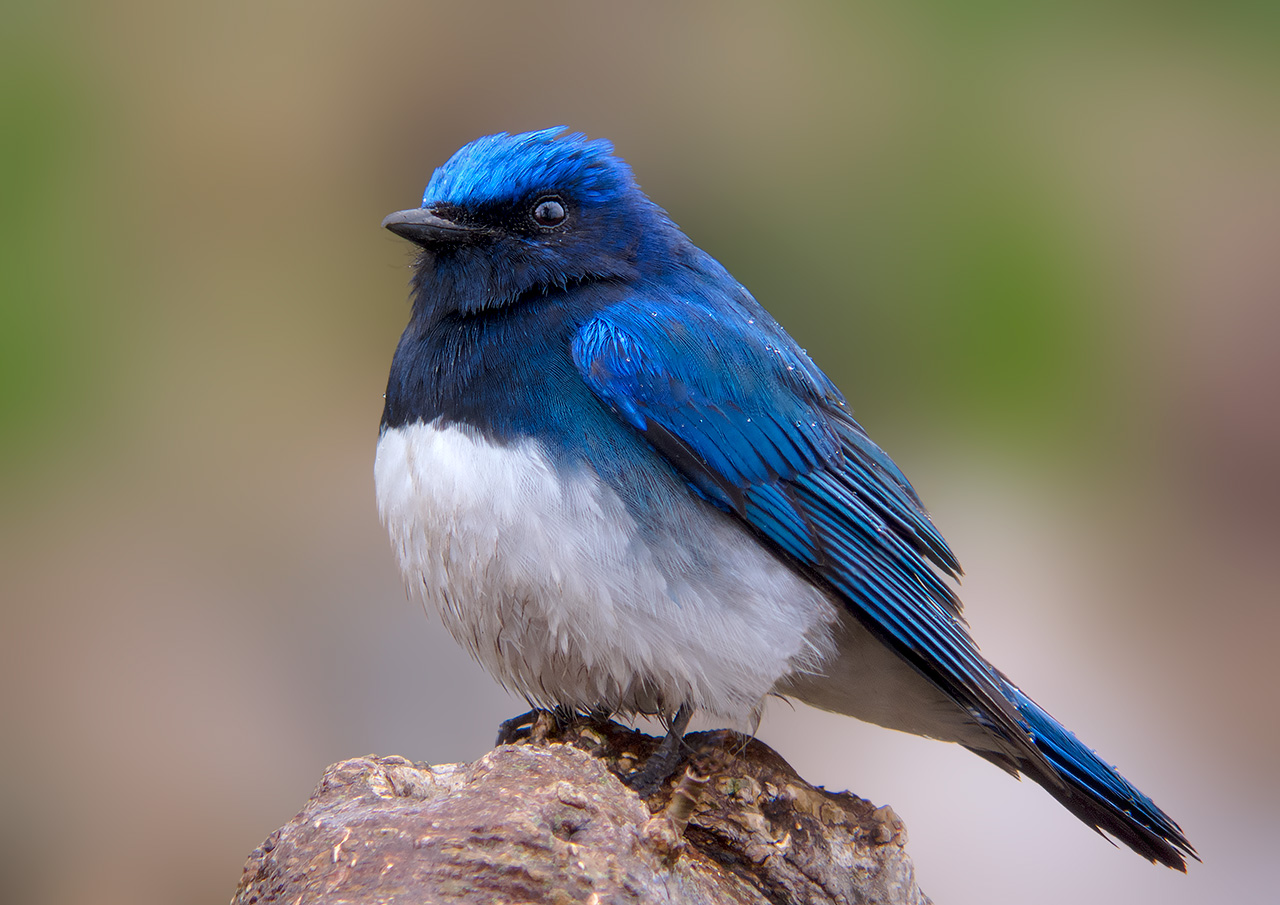
- Blue-and-white flycatcher, male, Hokkaido, Japan
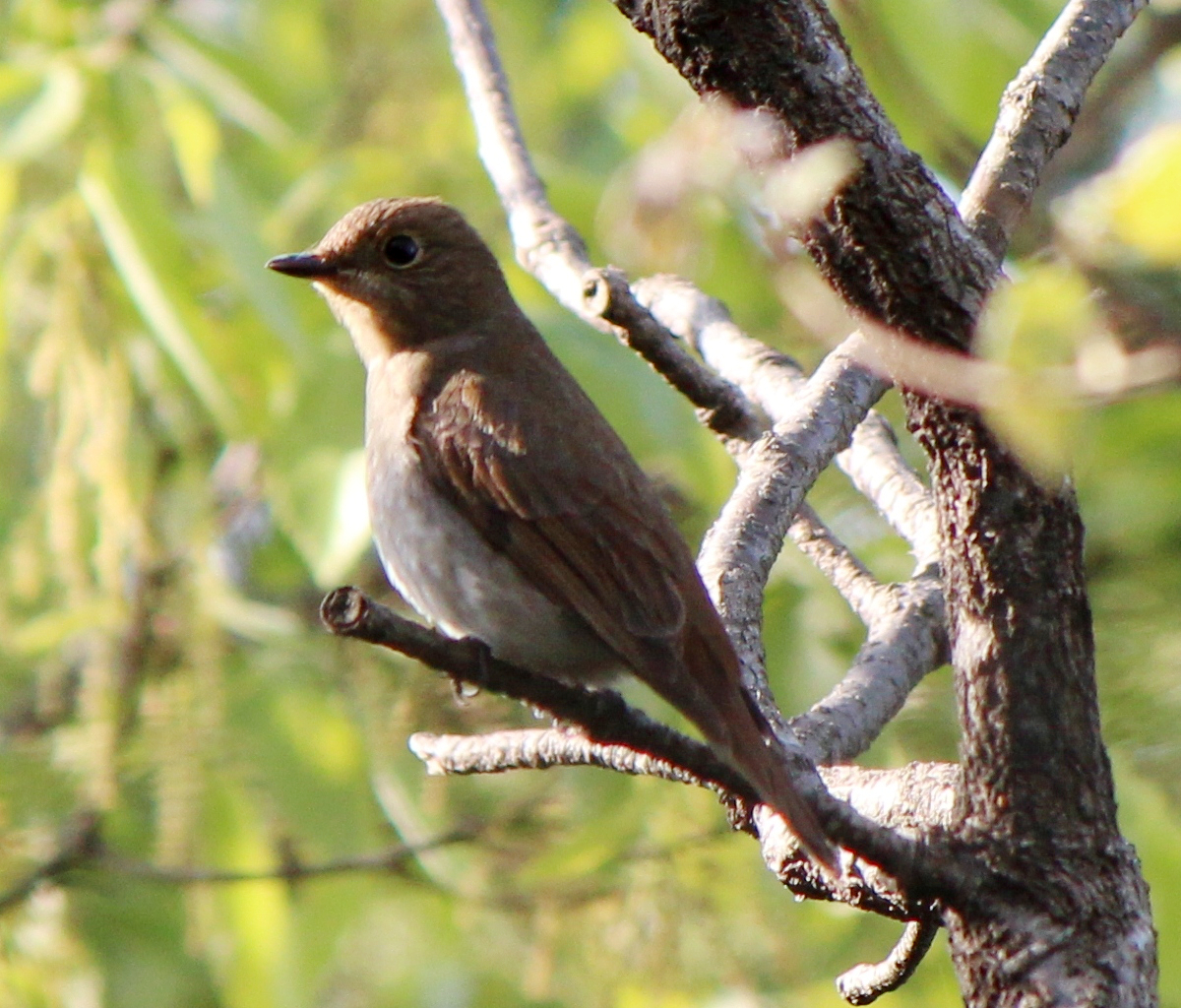
- Blue-and-white flycatcher, female, Japan

Conservation status
- Least Concern (IUCN 3.1)

Scientific classification
- Kingdom: Animalia
- Phylum: Chordata
- Class: Aves
- Order: Passeriformes
- Family: Muscicapidae
- Genus: Cyanoptila
- Species: C. cyanomelana

Binomial name
- Cyanoptila cyanomelana (Temminck, 1829)

= Blue-and-white flycatcher =

Species of bird

The blue-and-white flycatcher (Cyanoptila cyanomelana) is a migratory songbird in the Old World flycatcher family Muscicapidae. The species is also known as the Japanese flycatcher. It breeds in Japan, Korea, and in parts of north eastern China and the Russian Far East. It winters in South East Asia, especially in Vietnam, Cambodia, Thailand, Sumatra and Borneo. This species has been recorded as a vagrant from the Sinharaja Rainforest in Sri Lanka in 2014.

== Taxonomy and etymology ==
The species was first described in 1829 by Coenraad Jacob Temminck under the binomial name Muscicapa cyanomelana, and was transferred to its own genus Cyanoptila by Edward Blyth in 1847, on the basis of structural differences from other flycatchers, including its wing length and bill dimensions.

The genus name comes from ancient Greek; "kuanos" meaning dark blue, and "ptilon", plumage. The specific cyanomelana also comes from "kuanos", paired with melas, melanos meaning dark, black.

=== Subspecies ===
Two subspecies are accepted:

- C. c. cyanomelana (Temminck, 1829) - breeds in Japan and the southern Kuril Islands; it migrates south to winter in Myanmar, Thailand, and the Greater Sundas.
- C. c. intermedia (Weigold, 1922) - breeds in northeastern China (Heilongjiang southward to northeastern Hebei, north and east of Beijing), southeastern Russia (Amur Oblast and Primorsky Krai), and the Korean peninsula; it migrates south to winter in Myanmar, Thailand, and the Greater Sundas.

A former third subspecies from further southwest in China is now treated as a separate species, Zappey's flycatcher C. cumatilis.

== Description ==
The blue-and-white flycatcher is a large flycatcher (16–17 cm long, weight 25 g on average) with a striking plumage pattern. The male is deep cobalt blue, with black on the face down to the upper part of the breast and flanks, the rest of the underside white. There is also a prominent white patch on the base of the outer tail feathers. Immature males have the adult male's blue wings, but are otherwise brown like females.

The female is smaller on average than the male, with head, face and most of upperparts grey-brown, and pale beige-white on the lower part of the middle of the throat, young males are very similar. The female has a smaller-headed profile than other brown flycatchers in range.

The song is a short, melancholic sounding series of whistles.

== Ecology ==
=== Habitat ===
Blue-and-white flycatchers breed in primary and secondary lowland and submontane forests (including taiga, wooded slopes, and gullies) up to 1200 metres, and also in riverine thickets and plantations. Outside the breeding season, it uses coastal woodland, scrub, parks, and gardens, and in Borneo winters at elevations up to 1850 metres in forested hills, lower montane forest, plantations, and logged lowland forest.

These flycatchers are most active in the morning.

=== Breeding ===
The breeding season extends from late May to early August. The nests, constructed primarily of moss, are typically situated in a variety of sheltered locations, including crevices in cliffs, among tree roots, under overhanging stream banks, in shallow tree hollows, and, rarely, within abandoned buildings. The clutch size ranges from four to six eggs, which are incubated solely by the female for a period of 14 to 15 days. Females spend more time and energy caring for young than males. Nest parasites include the northern hawk-cuckoo, common cuckoo and lesser cuckoo.

=== Diet ===
It feeds mainly on insects and larvae, but also eats berries, including pokeweed.

== Status ==
Although the species population is decreasing, its wide distribution and likely large population size lead to its classification as "Least Concern" on the IUCN Red List.

== Gallery ==
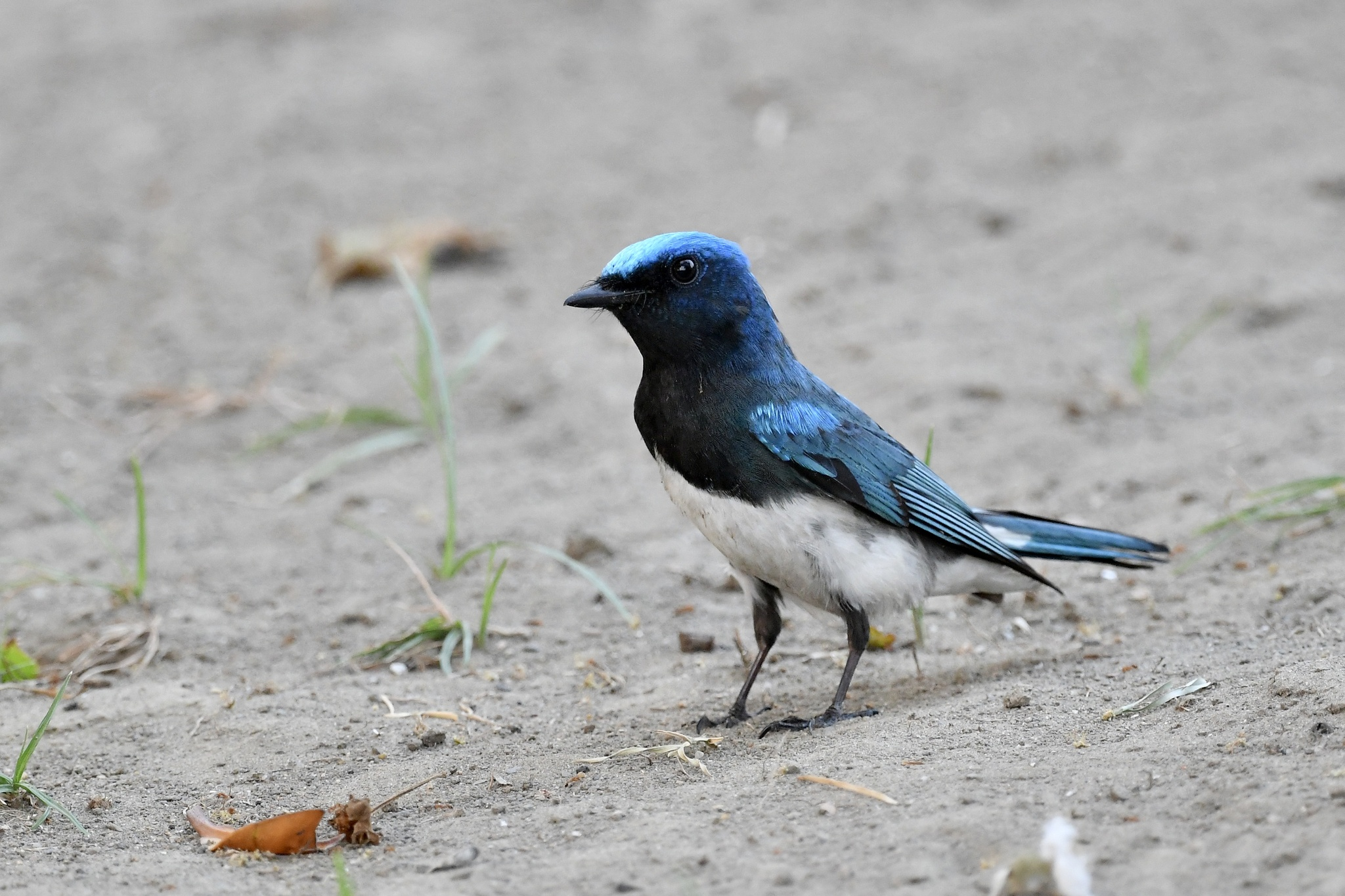
Adult male, Taiwan

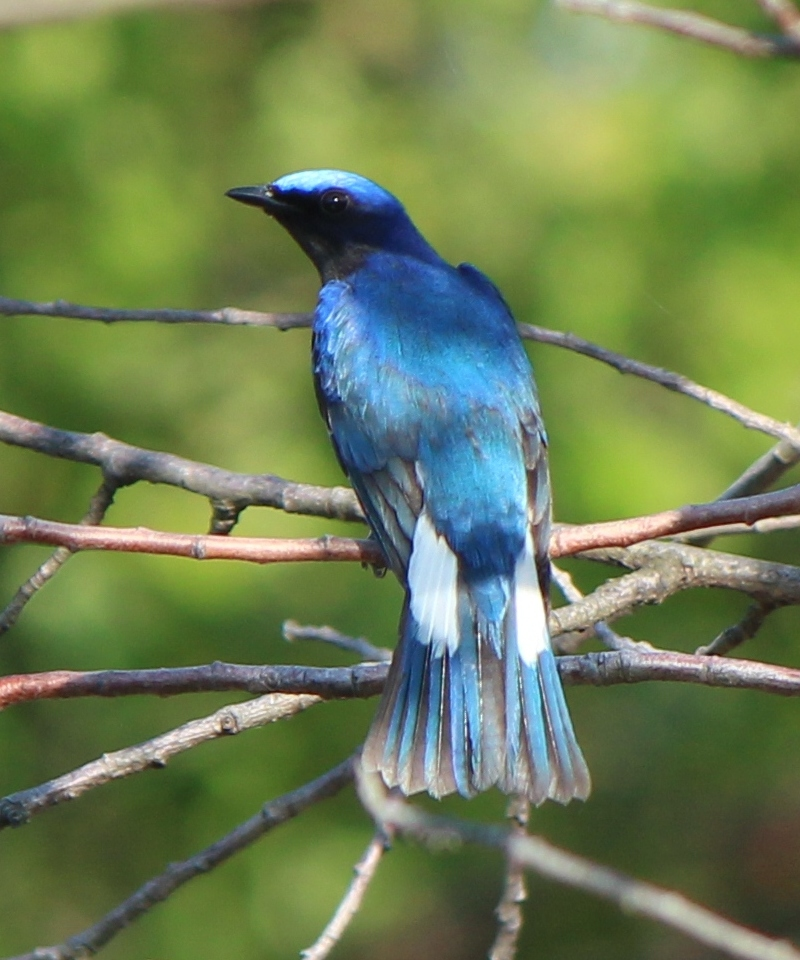
Rear view, Japan

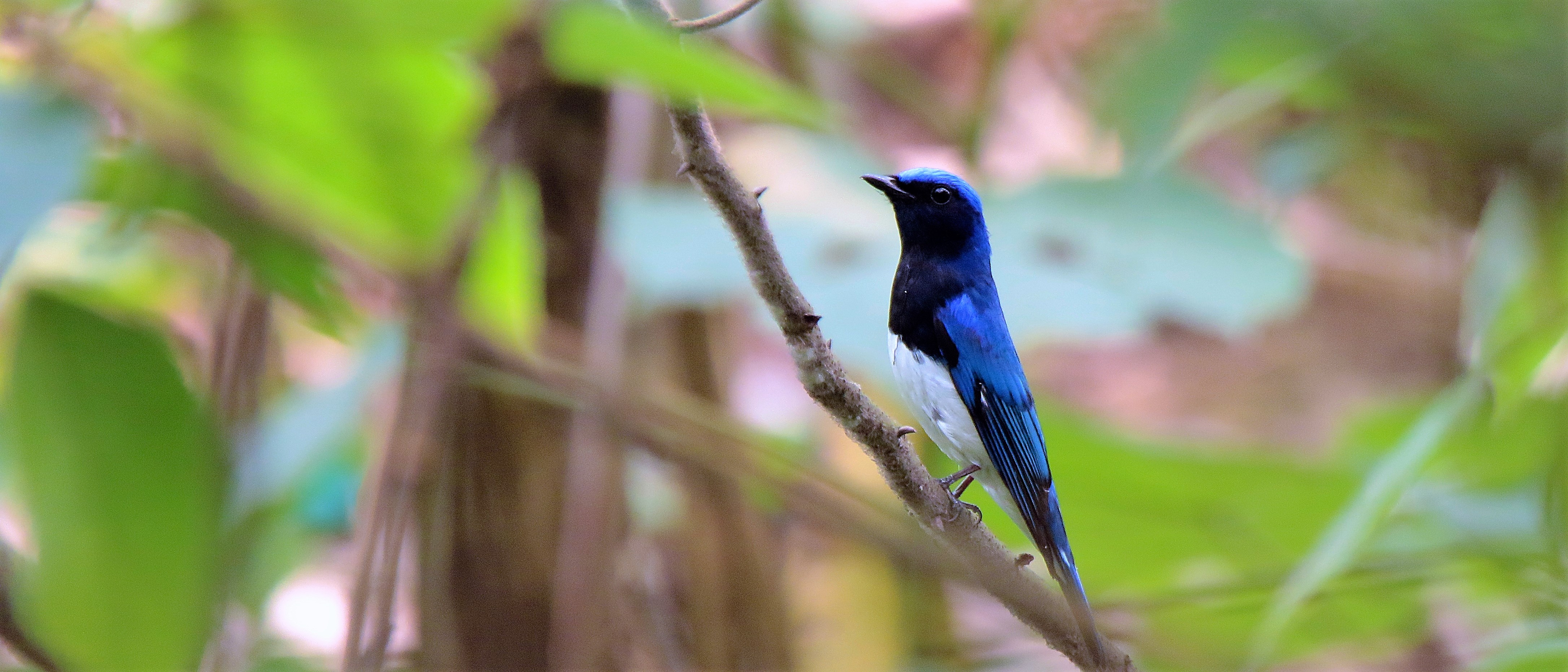
Adult male

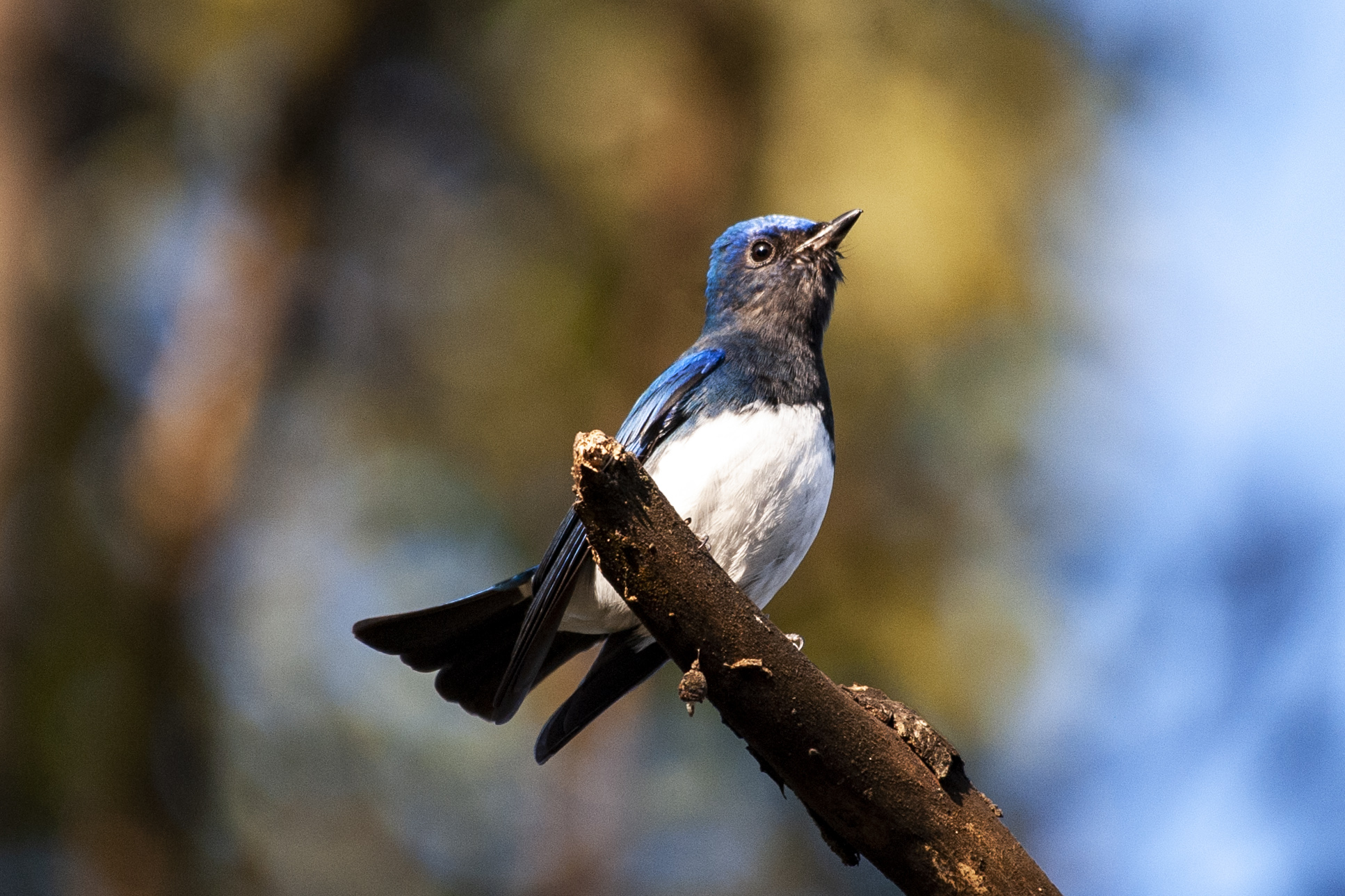
In India

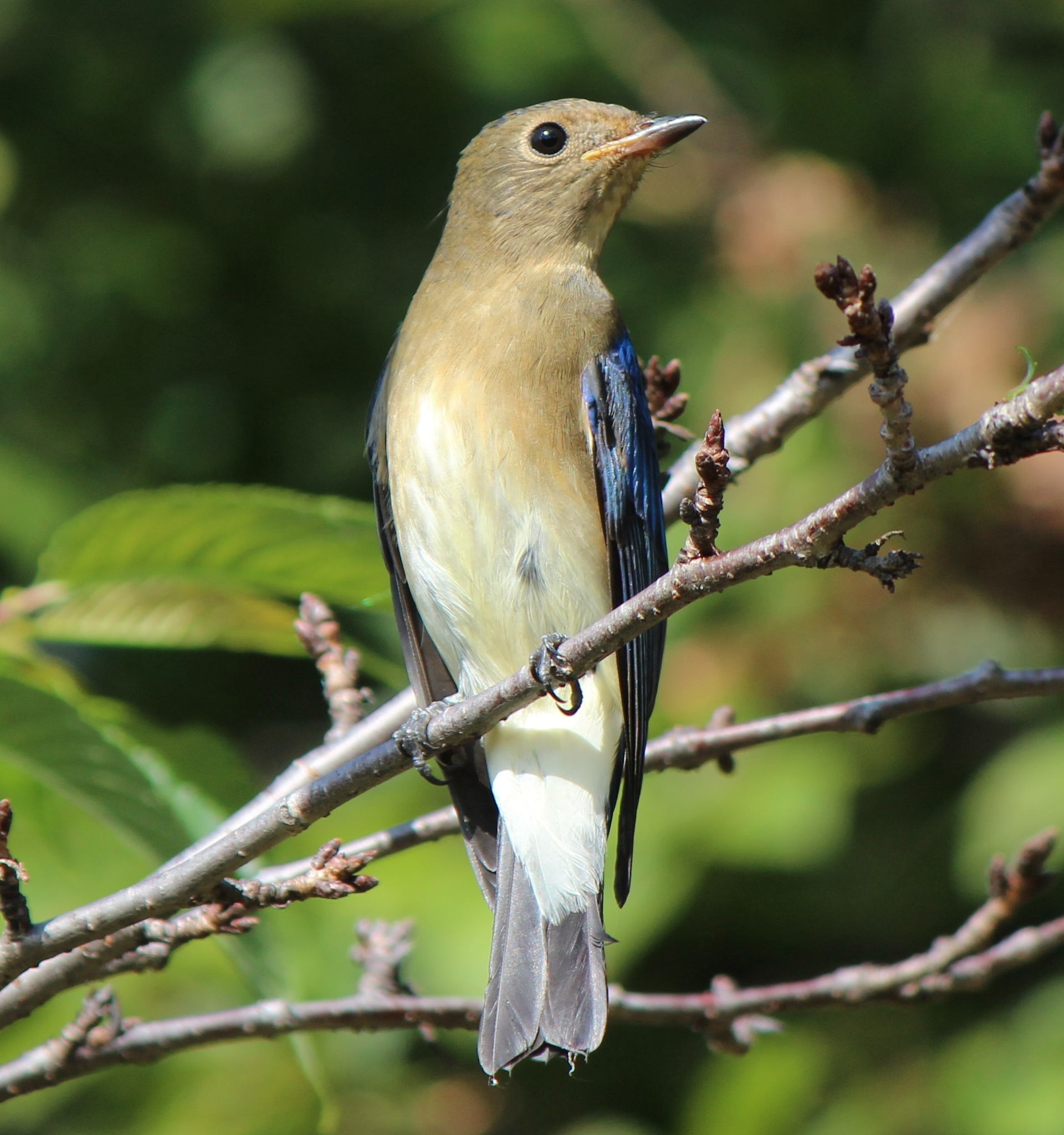
Immature male, note the blue wings

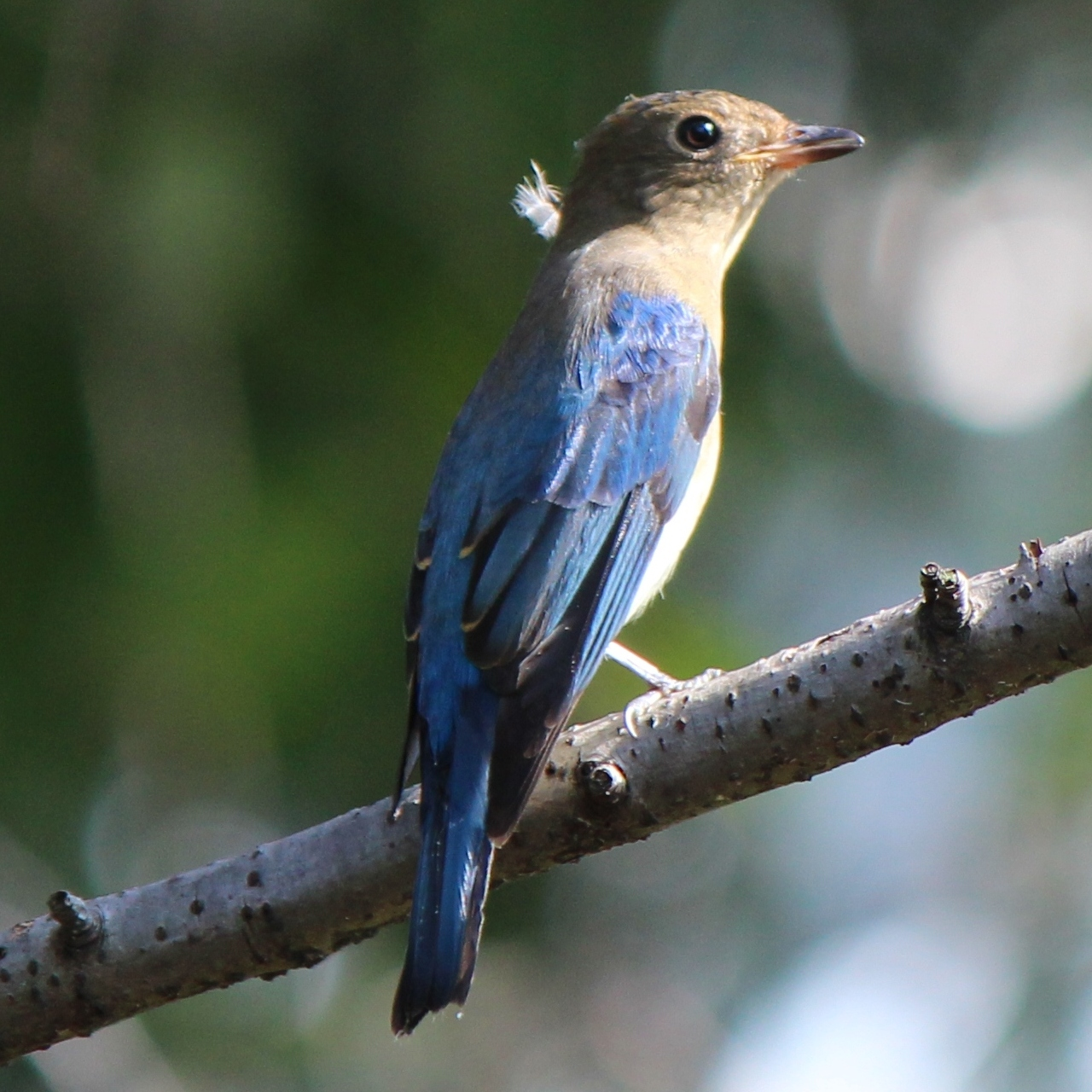
Immature male
