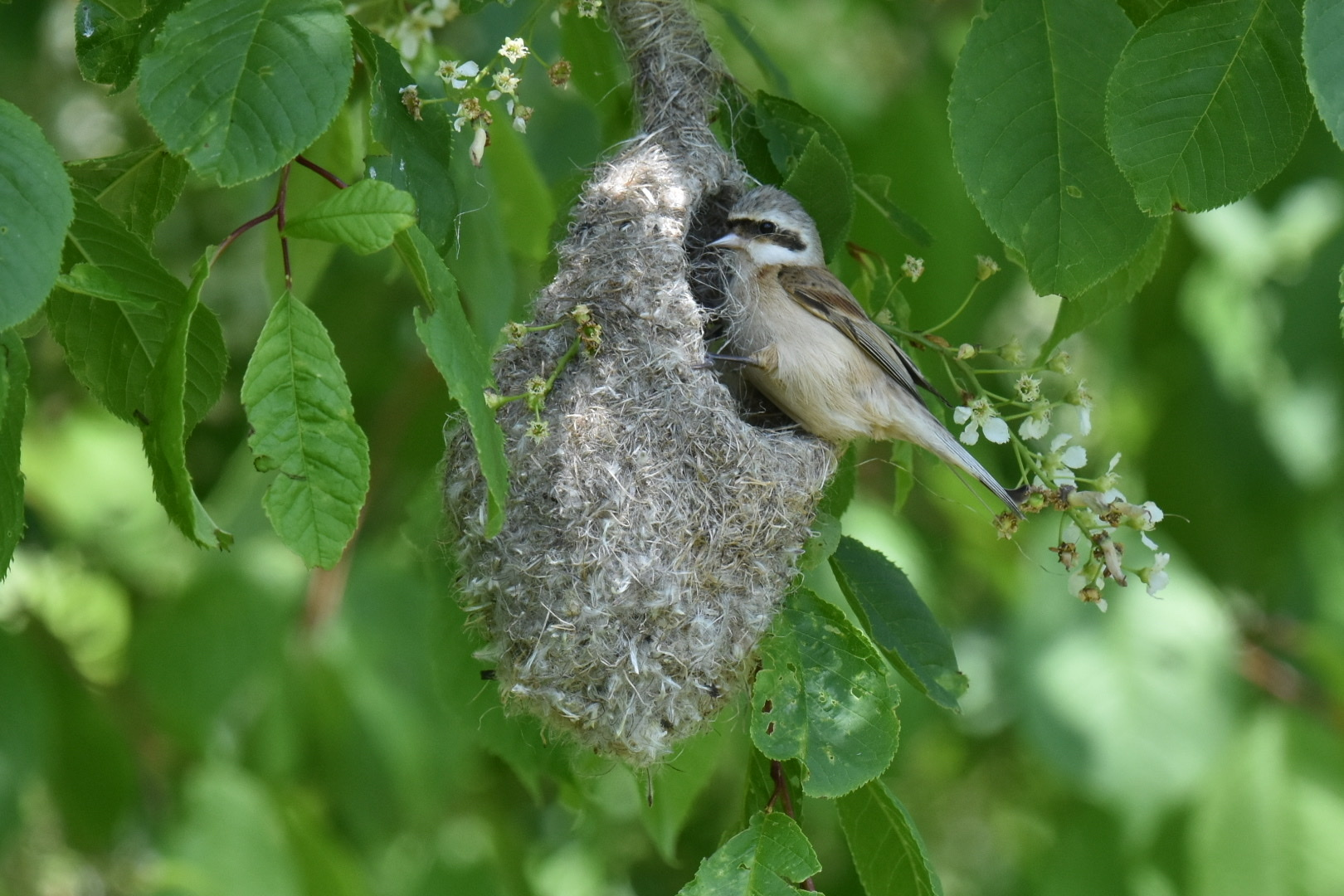
- With nest, Primorsky Krai, Russia

Conservation status
- Least Concern (IUCN 3.1)

Scientific classification
- Kingdom: Animalia
- Phylum: Chordata
- Class: Aves
- Order: Passeriformes
- Family: Remizidae
- Genus: Remiz
- Species: R. consobrinus

Binomial name
- Remiz consobrinus (R. Swinhoe, 1870)

= Chinese penduline tit =

Species of bird

The Chinese penduline tit (Remiz consobrinus) is a species of bird in the family Remizidae. The species was first described by Robert Swinhoe in 1870. It is native to Manchuria. There are 10 species in the family Remizidae. They are similar to true tits, but make characteristic penduline nests. They inhabit open fields and wetlands. They have sharp bill tips and the sexes look alike.

== Description ==
The birds are 11 cm in length. They are small, pale birds of reedbeds with a fine-pointed bill, often in flocks of 10 to 20.

Male: Greyish crown and nape. Black mask from forehead edged white. Chestnut mantle, half-collar and wing-coverts contrast with dark wings and black tail in flight. Whitish underparts are marked with buff.

Female: Mask brown. Upperparts browner lacking chestnut.

== Habitat and behavior ==
The Chinese penduline tit is found especially in reedbeds and marshes in Manchuria; it winters sparsely throughout eastern Asia (namely along the Yangtze river valley). It inhabits, in nesting and non-nesting, in areas of agricultural pastures, wetlands with marshes or brackish ponds. It is often in flocks of 10 to 20.

It winters in the south of China.

Voice: Very thin drawn out 'tseeoo', 'sseeoo'.

The Chinese penduline tit is insectivorous. It feeds on insects, larvae, spiders, caterpillars and sometimes, especially in winter, on small seeds.

The bird is an acrobatic climber, it can remain suspended by one leg and take its food with the other.

== Reproduction ==
The male chooses the tree which will carry the nest from 3 to 15 m height. The nest of the Chinese penduline tit is a marvel of architecture. It has the aspect of a pear-shaped purse. The nest is extended by a tubular appendix and offers a lateral entrance.

The female, having arranged the interior of the nest, generally lays between 5 and 10 eggs, which she incubates alone during 12 to 15 days. When the young have fledged, the nest is deformed and partly disintegrated. They return there to sleep during 15 to 20 days, then leave the place.

== Conservation status ==
The population is increasing, it is considered by the IUCN as "least concern".
