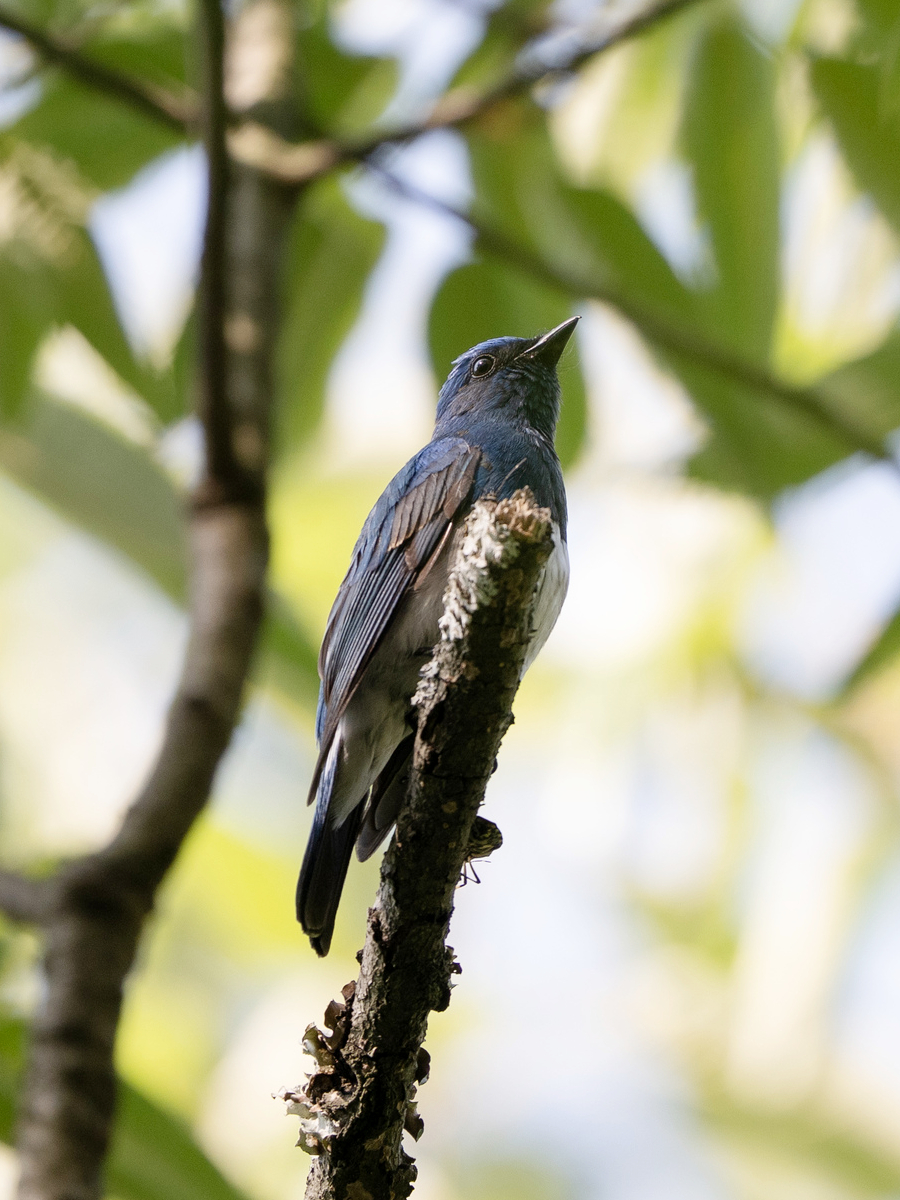
- Male Zappey's flycatcher in northern Sichuan, China

Conservation status
- Near Threatened (IUCN 3.1)

Scientific classification
- Kingdom: Animalia
- Phylum: Chordata
- Class: Aves
- Order: Passeriformes
- Family: Muscicapidae
- Genus: Cyanoptila
- Species: C. cumatilis

Binomial name
- Cyanoptila cumatilis Thayer & Bangs, 1909

= Zappey's flycatcher =

Species of bird

Zappey's flycatcher (Cyanoptila cumatilis) is a songbird in the Old World flycatcher family Muscicapidae. It is migratory, breeding in central China from central Sichuan northeast to the mountains west of Beijing, and wintering south to the Malay Peninsula, Sumatra, and Java. It closely similar to, and was formerly considered to be conspecific with, the blue-and-white flycatcher, which breeds further east from northeastern China east to Japan.

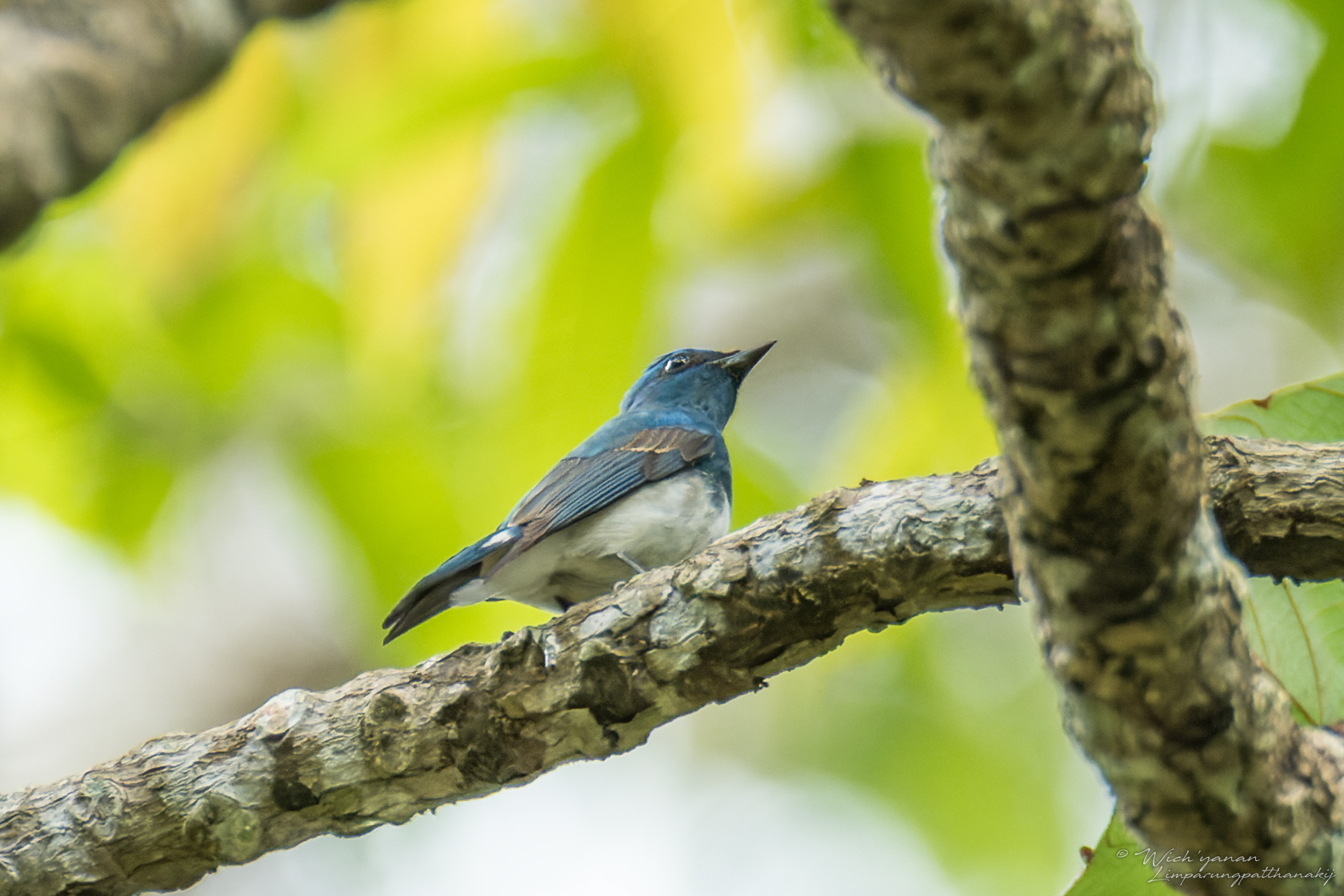
Male in winter in southern Thailand

It is a large flycatcher, 17 cm long. The males have slightly greenish turquoise-blue upperparts, greenish-black face and upper breast, and pure white underparts, faintly greyish on the flanks; the tail is similar colour to the back, with two small white patches on the sides at the base of the tail. Zappey's flycatcher differs from blue-and-white flycatcher in the greener-toned blue and black, compared to the more intense dark blue and black of its relative.

The females are similar pattern, but greyish-brown rather than blue, and have a white throat. Immature (yearling) males are intermediate, with blue wings, rump, and tail like adult males, but grey-brown head and mantle and white throat like females. The bill and legs are dark grey to black, and the eyes brown.
