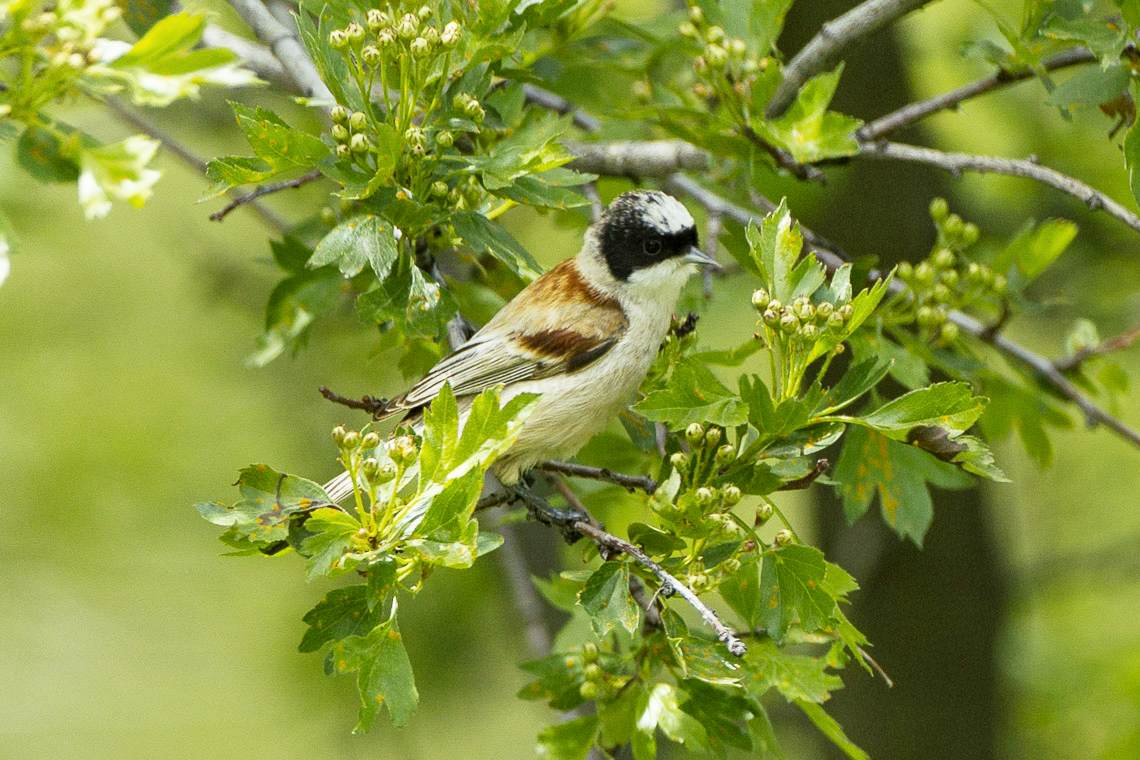

Conservation status
- Least Concern (IUCN 3.1)

Scientific classification
- Kingdom: Animalia
- Phylum: Chordata
- Class: Aves
- Order: Passeriformes
- Family: Remizidae
- Genus: Remiz
- Species: R. coronatus

Binomial name
- Remiz coronatus (Severtsov, 1873)

= White-crowned penduline tit =

Species of bird

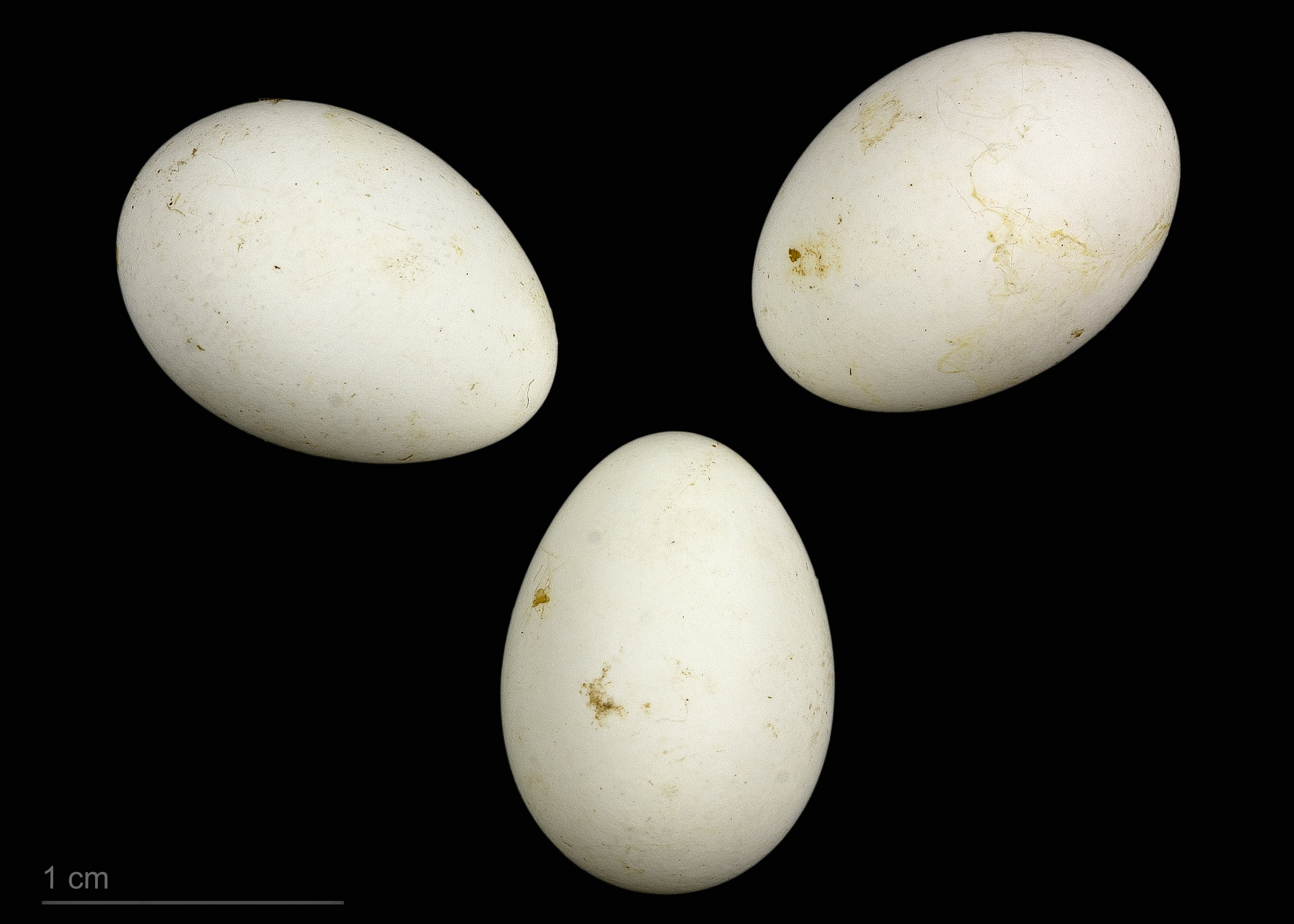
Remiz coronatus - (MHNT)

The white-crowned penduline tit (Remiz coronatus) is a species of bird in the family Remizidae.

Its breeding range extends from Central Asia throughout eastern Kazakhstan and northern Mongolia, with an isolated year-round population in northern China. It has two wintering ranges: one from the southeastern rim of the Caspian Sea throughout eastern Iran and the other mainly in Pakistan.

Its natural habitats are boreal forests and temperate forests.
