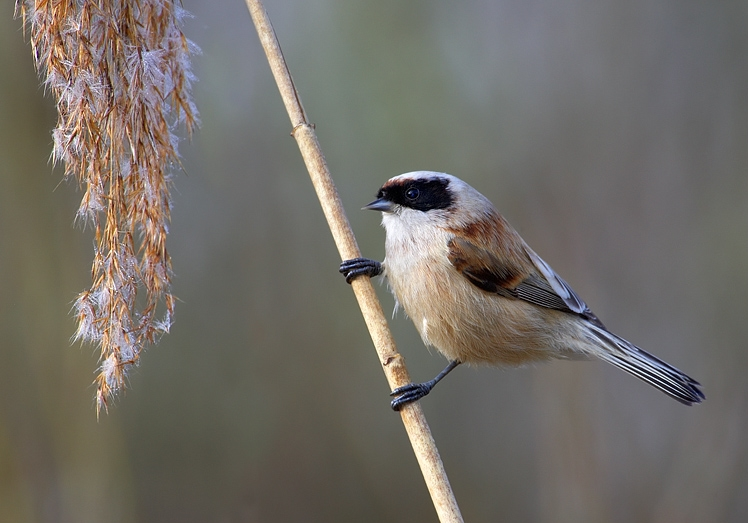
- in Olomouc, Czech Republic.

Conservation status
- Least Concern (IUCN 3.1)

Scientific classification
- Kingdom: Animalia
- Phylum: Chordata
- Class: Aves
- Order: Passeriformes
- Family: Remizidae
- Genus: Remiz
- Species: R. pendulinus

Binomial name
- Remiz pendulinus (Linnaeus, 1758)
- Range of R. pendulinus Breeding Resident Passage Non-breeding

Synonyms
- Motacilla pendulina Linnaeus, 1758; Parus pendulinus Linnaeus, 1766

= Eurasian penduline tit =

Species of bird

The Eurasian penduline tit or European penduline tit (Remiz pendulinus) is a passerine bird of the genus Remiz. It is relatively widespread throughout the western Palearctic. It is migratory in the northern part of its range but resident in the southern part.

The breeding range in Western Europe experienced an expansion during the 1980s and 1990s. This was accompanied by an expansion of the species' winter range and reached as far south as northern Morocco.

It builds an elaborate hanging nest, formerly used in Central Europe as children's slippers.

== Taxonomy ==
The Eurasian penduline tit was formally described by the Swedish naturalist Carl Linnaeus in 1758 in the tenth edition of his Systema Naturae under the binomial name Motacilla pedulinus. It is now placed in the genus Remiz that was introduced in 1819 by the Polish zoologist Feliks Paweł Jarocki. The genus name Remiz is the Polish word for the Eurasian penduline tit. The specific epithet is from Latin pendulus meaning "pendant" or "hanging down", referring to the nest.

Four subspecies are recognised:

- R. p. pendulinus (Linnaeus, 1758) – Europe to the Ural Mountains, Caucasus and west Turkey
- R. p. menzbieri (Zarudny, 1913) – south, east Turkey and Syria to Armenia and northwest Iran
- R. p. caspius (Peltzam, 1870) – southwest Russia and northwest Kazakhstan
- R. p. jaxarticus (Severtzov, 1873) – east Ural Mountains to west Siberia and north Kazakhstan

== Description ==
This is a small tit, 10–11.5 cm (3.9–4.5 in) in length with a finely pointed bill and a relatively long tail. The head is light grey with a black "mask" through the eye. The back is chestnut brown. The sexes are very similar in appearance, but the male has a broader mask and a more rufous back.

== Behaviour ==
=== Breeding ===
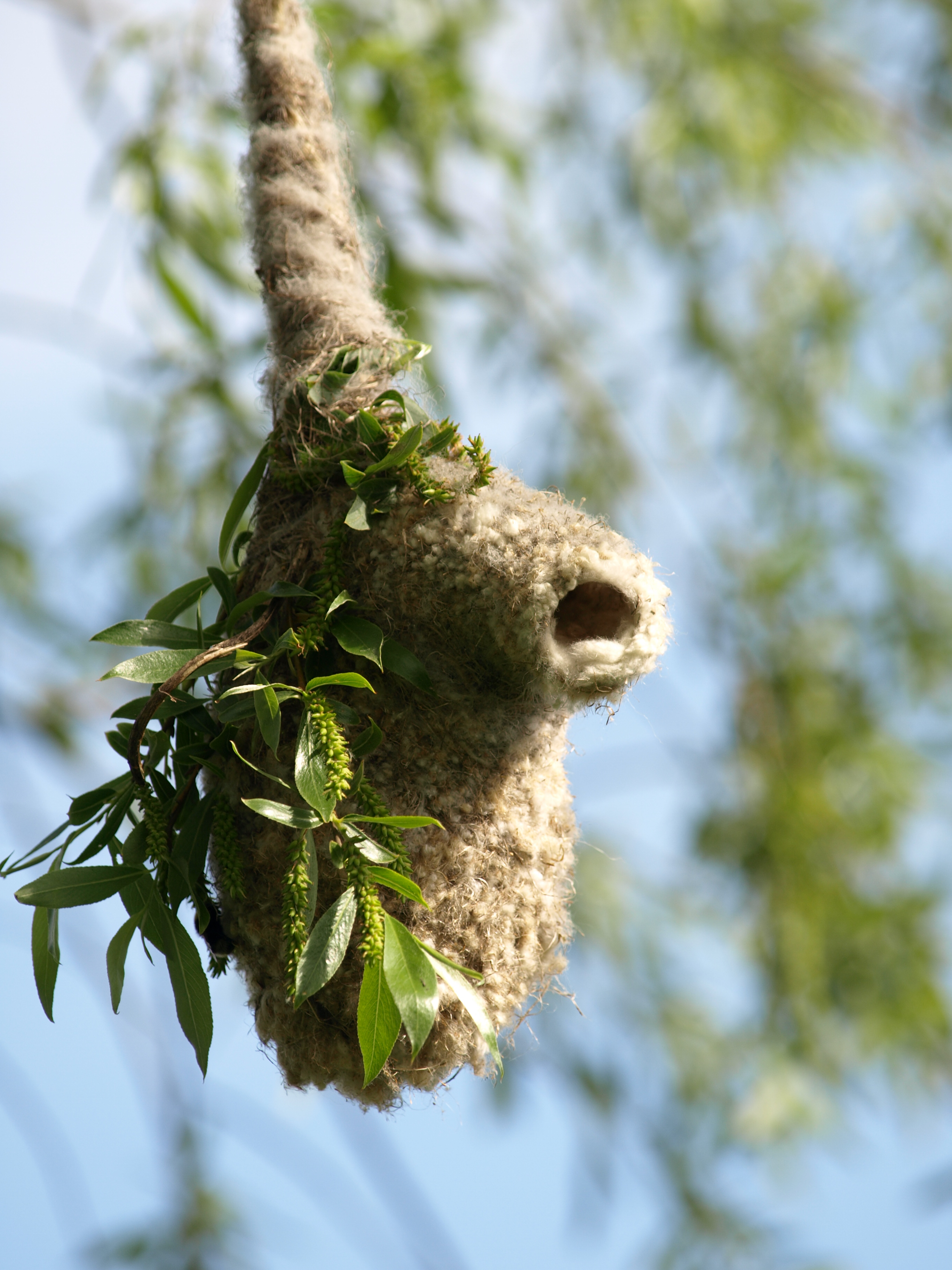
Nest in Poland

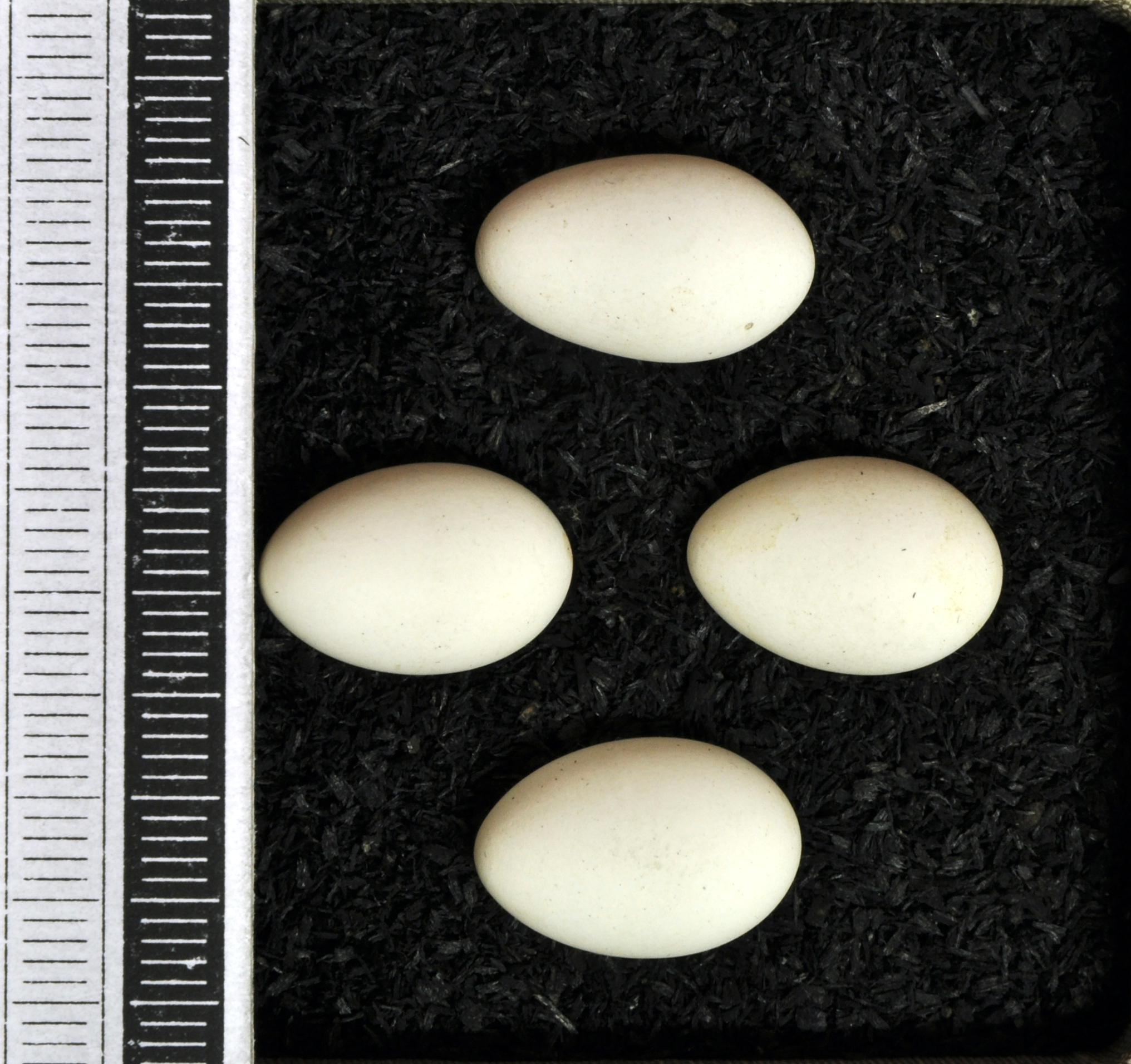
Eggs, Collection Museum Wiesbaden

The eggs are laid from end of April to the beginning of July. The nest is suspended from thin long branches of trees such as willow (Salix), elm (Ulmus) or birch (Betula), often over water. The nest can also sometimes be suspended between two or three reeds (Typha) only a meter or so above the water. The nest is a large free hanging pouch-shaped structure, approximately 25 cm (9.8 in) in height and 17 cm (6.7 in) in diameter. It is made of plant fibres, grass, hair and wool with an entrance tube at one side. Both sexes contribute to the construction which takes around 20 days. Eggs are laid daily. The clutch contains 6 to 8 white eggs which measure 16.2 mm × 10.7 mm (0.64 in × 0.42 in) and weigh 0.95 g (0.034 oz). Incubation starts after the last egg is laid and lasts for 14 days. The eggs are incubated by either the male or more usually the female, but not by both. The hatching is synchronous. The young are cared for by either the male or the female but rarely by both parents. The nestlings are fed larval insects and spiders. The nestlings fledge at around 22 days of age. The parents will sometimes attempt to raise a second brood, but this is rarely successful.

=== Feeding ===
The Eurasian penduline tit usually eats insects and spiders but will also eat seeds such as those from the willow (Salix). It generally searches for food in trees but will also forage in reeds where it will take insects from the stem as well as the seed head. It uses one foot to cling to the reed and the other to pull out clumps of seeds from the head.

== Status and conservation ==
The penduline tit has a large range, estimated at 1-10 million square kilometres (0.4-3.8 million square miles), and a population estimated at 420,000–840,000 individuals in Europe alone, and there is evidence that the population is increasing. It is therefore not believed to meet the IUCN Red List threshold criterion of a population decline of more than 30% in ten years or three generations, and is evaluated as Least Concern.

== Sources ==
- Cramp, Stanley; Perrins, C.M., eds. (1993). "Remiz pendulinus Penduline Tit". Handbook of the Birds of Europe the Middle East and North Africa. The Birds of the Western Palearctic. Vol. VII: Flycatchers to Strikes. Oxford: Oxford University Press. pp. 377–396. ISBN 978-0-19-857510-8.
