= Oberthur =

Oberthür (or Oberthur), a German and French-Alsatian family name, may refer to:

== Companies ==
- Oberthur Technologies, a French security services company
- Imprimerie Oberthur (Oberthur Printing), a historical French printing company founded by François-Charles Oberthür
- Oberthur Cash Protection, a French manufacturer of banknote protection systems

== People ==
- Charles Oberthür (composer) (1819–1895), German harpist and composer
- Franz Oberthür (1745–1831), German Roman Catholic theologian
- François-Charles Oberthür (1818–1893), French printer and amateur entomologist
- Charles Oberthür (entomologist) (1845–1924), son of François-Charles Oberthür, French entomologist specialised in Lepidoptera
- René Oberthür (1852–1944), son of François-Charles Oberthür, French entomologist specialised in Coleoptera
