= Catocala martyrum =

Scientific classification
- Kingdom: Animalia
- Phylum: Arthropoda
- Class: Insecta
- Order: Lepidoptera
- Superfamily: Noctuoidea
- Family: Erebidae
- Genus: Catocala
- Species: C. martyrum

Binomial name
- Catocala martyrum Oberthür, 1881

Species of moth

Catocala martyrum is a moth in the family Erebidae first described by Charles Oberthür in 1881. It is found in China.
