= Venusia violettaria =

Scientific classification
- Domain: Eukaryota
- Kingdom: Animalia
- Phylum: Arthropoda
- Class: Insecta
- Order: Lepidoptera
- Family: Geometridae
- Genus: Venusia
- Species: V. violettaria

Binomial name
- Venusia violettaria Wehrli, 1931

Synonyms
- Venusia (Discoloxia) violettaria kukunoora Wehrli, 1931

Species of moth

Venusia violettaria is a moth in the family Geometridae first described by Charles Oberthür in 1931. It is found in China.
