= Melanonaclia lugens =

Scientific classification
- Domain: Eukaryota
- Kingdom: Animalia
- Phylum: Arthropoda
- Class: Insecta
- Order: Lepidoptera
- Superfamily: Noctuoidea
- Family: Erebidae
- Subfamily: Arctiinae
- Genus: Melanonaclia
- Species: M. lugens

Binomial name
- Melanonaclia lugens (Oberthür, 1893)

Synonyms
- Naclia lugens Oberthür, 1893

Species of moth

Melanonaclia lugens is a moth of the subfamily Arctiinae. It was described by Oberthür, 1893. It is found in Madagascar.
