= Scopula gastonaria =

Scientific classification
- Domain: Eukaryota
- Kingdom: Animalia
- Phylum: Arthropoda
- Class: Insecta
- Order: Lepidoptera
- Family: Geometridae
- Genus: Scopula
- Species: S. gastonaria

Binomial name
- Scopula gastonaria (Oberthür, 1876)

Synonyms
- Tephrina gastonaria Oberthur, 1876; Eubolia gastonaria; Acidalia luteofasciata Rothschild, 1913; Acidalia gastonaria candicans Prout, 1913; Eubolia gastonaria obscuraria Bang-Haas, 1910

Species of geometer moth in subfamily Sterrhinae

Scopula gastonaria is a moth of the family Geometridae. It was described by Oberthür in 1876. It is endemic to Algeria.

== Subspecies ==
- Scopula gastonaria gastonaria (Algeria)
- Scopula gastonaria luteofasciata (Rothschild, 1913) (southern Algeria)
