= Salcedia =

Scientific classification
- Kingdom: Animalia
- Phylum: Arthropoda
- Class: Insecta
- Order: Coleoptera
- Suborder: Adephaga
- Family: Carabidae
- Subfamily: Scaritinae
- Genus: Salcedia; Fairmaire, 1899

Type species
- Salcedia perrieri Fairmaire, 1899

Synonyms
- Zelma Andrewes, 1920

Genus of beetles

Salcedia is a genus of beetles in the family Carabidae, containing the following species:

- Salcedia africana (Britton, 1947)
- Salcedia baroensis Balkenohl, 2020
- Salcedia coquilhati Alluaud, 1932
- Salcedia elongata Alluaud, 1932
- Salcedia faillei Balkenohl, 2020
- Salcedia lukulua Balkenohl, 2020
- Salcedia matsumotoi Balkenohl, 2020
- Salcedia miranda (Andrewes, 1920)
- Salcedia nigeriensis Alluaud, 1930
- Salcedia parallela Baehr, 1998
- Salcedia perrieri Fairmaire, 1899
- Salcedia procera Balkenohl, 2020
- Salcedia putzeysi (R. Oberthür, 1883)
- Salcedia robusta Balkenohl, 2020
- Salcedia schoutedeni Alluaud, 1930
- Salcedia tuberculata Balkenohl, 2020
- Salcedia unifoveata Balkenohl, 2020
- Salcedia utetea Balkenohl, 2020
