= Venusia tchraria =

Scientific classification
- Domain: Eukaryota
- Kingdom: Animalia
- Phylum: Arthropoda
- Class: Insecta
- Order: Lepidoptera
- Family: Geometridae
- Genus: Venusia
- Species: V. tchraria

Binomial name
- Venusia tchraria Oberthür, 1893

Species of moth

Venusia tchraria is a moth in the family Geometridae first described by Charles Oberthür in 1893. It is found in China.
