= Catocala largeteaui =

Scientific classification
- Kingdom: Animalia
- Phylum: Arthropoda
- Class: Insecta
- Order: Lepidoptera
- Superfamily: Noctuoidea
- Family: Erebidae
- Genus: Catocala
- Species: C. largeteaui

Binomial name
- Catocala largeteaui Oberthür, 1881

Synonyms
- Ephesia largeteaui yunnana Mell, 1936

Species of moth

Catocala largeteaui is a moth in the family Erebidae first described by Charles Oberthür in 1881. It is found in China.

== Subspecies ==
- Catocala largeteaui largeteaui
- Catocala largeteaui yunnana (Mell, 1936) (China: Yunnan)
