= Catocala triphaenoides =

Scientific classification
- Kingdom: Animalia
- Phylum: Arthropoda
- Class: Insecta
- Order: Lepidoptera
- Superfamily: Noctuoidea
- Family: Erebidae
- Genus: Catocala
- Species: C. triphaenoides

Binomial name
- Catocala triphaenoides Oberthür, 1881

Species of moth

Catocala triphaenoides is a moth in the family Erebidae first described by Charles Oberthür in 1881. It is found in northern China.
