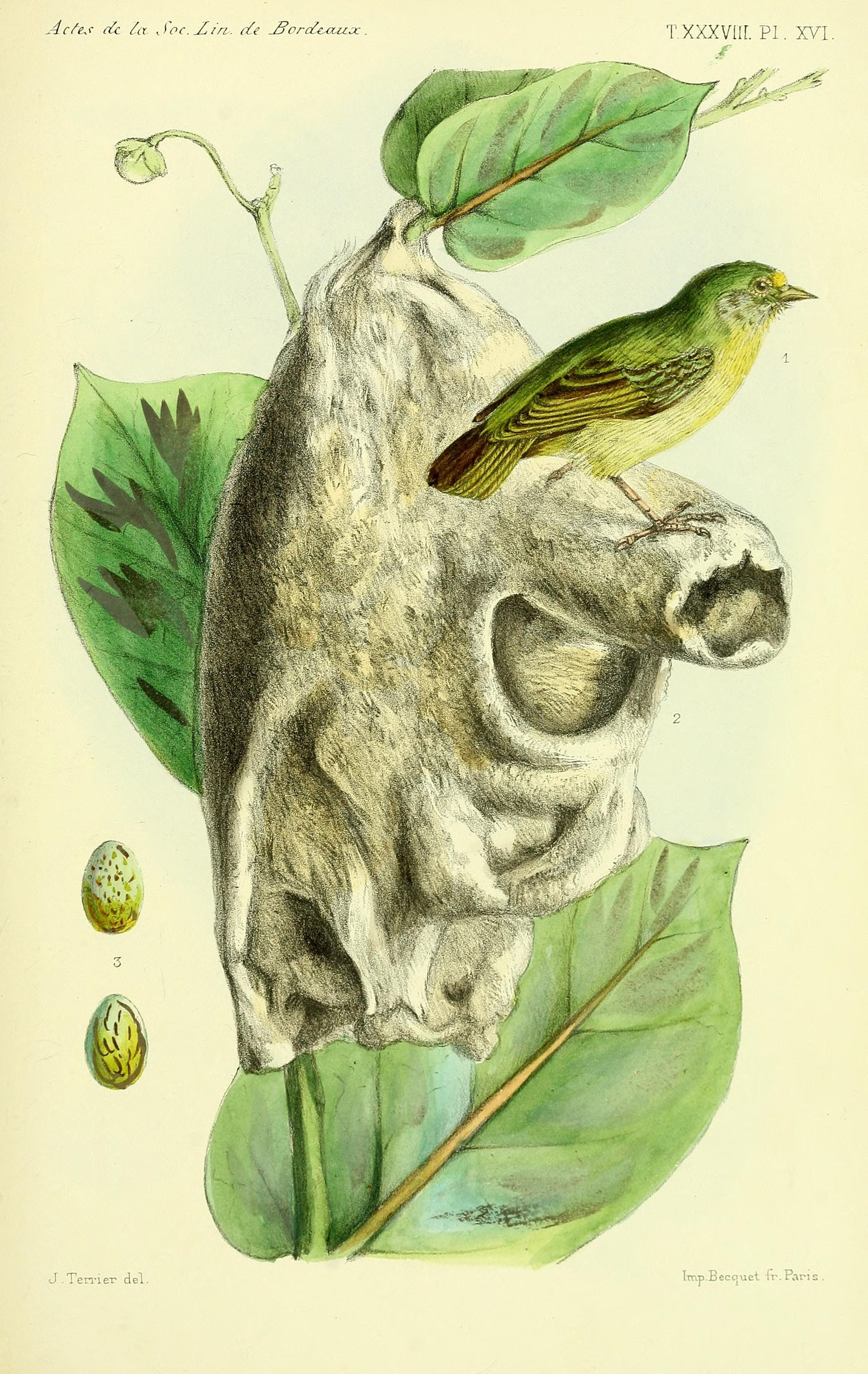
- The bird and its nest. Alphonse Trémeau de Rochebrune, 1884

Conservation status
- Least Concern (IUCN 3.1)

Scientific classification
- Kingdom: Animalia
- Phylum: Chordata
- Class: Aves
- Order: Passeriformes
- Family: Remizidae
- Genus: Anthoscopus
- Species: A. parvulus

Binomial name
- Anthoscopus parvulus (Heuglin, 1864)
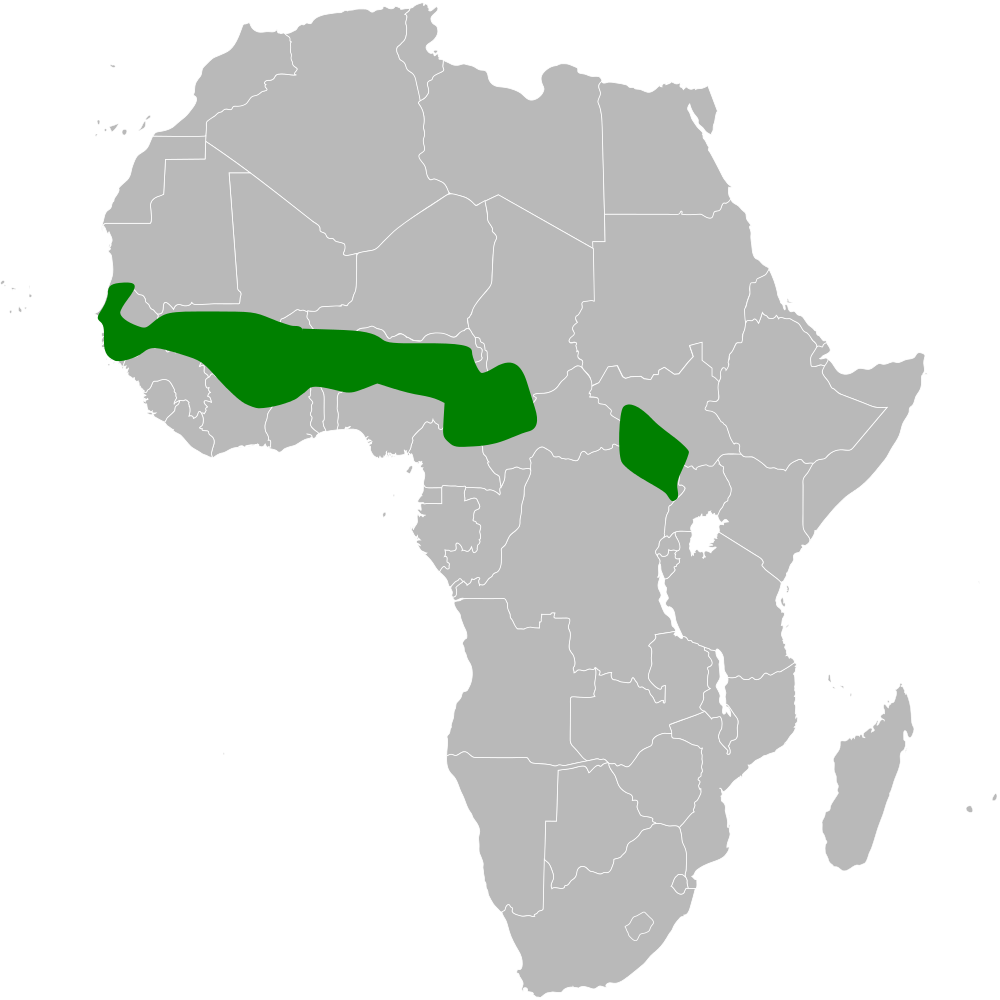

Synonyms
- Aegithalus calotropiphilus Rochebrune, 1883; Anthoscopus citrinus Reichenow, 1921

= Yellow penduline tit =

Species of bird

Yellow penduline tit (Anthoscopus parvulus) is a species of bird in the family Remizidae. This small yellow passerine bird is found in semi-arid savanna regions of West Africa.

== Taxonomy ==
The yellow penduline tit was formally described in 1864 by the German explorer and ornithologist Theodor von Heuglin under the binomial name Aegithalus parvulus. This species is now placed in the genus Anthoscopus that was introduced in 1851 by the German ornithologist Jean Cabanis. The genus name combines the Ancient Greek anthos meaning "blossom" or "flower" with skopos meaning "searcher". The specific epithet parvulus is Latin for "very small" (a diminutive of parvus meaning "small"). The yellow penduline tit is considered by some to be monotypic as no subspecies are clearly distinguishable. The ranges of some proposed subspecies are however widely disjunct.

- A. parvulus senegalensis (Grote, 1924) described based on a specimen obtained by Victor Planchat from Saint Louis, Senegal.
- A. parvulus aureus Bannerman, 1939 - N.W. Ghana
- A. parvulus parvulus (Heuglin, 1864) - South Chad, Uganda

== Description ==
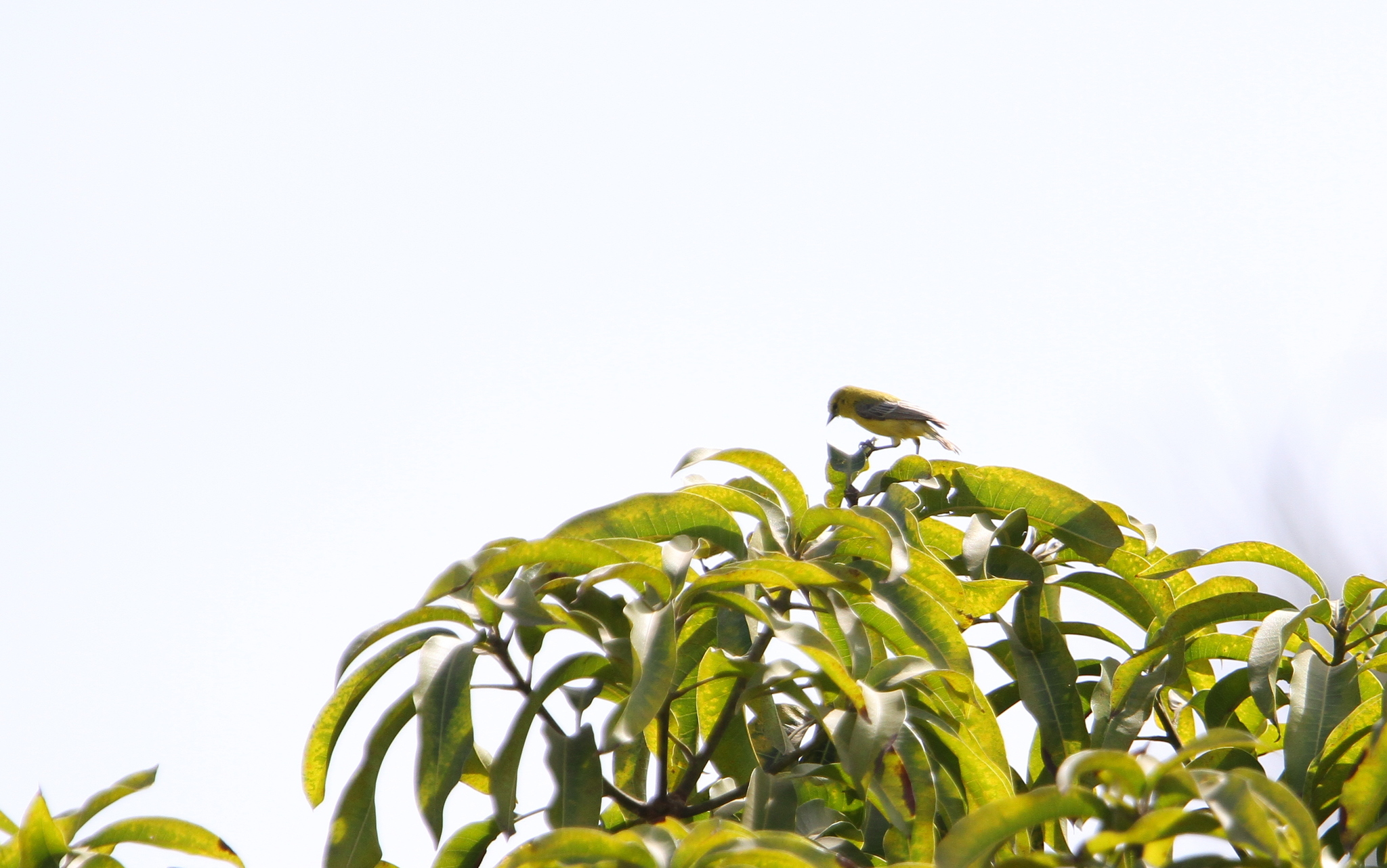
Live bird in Gambia

The yellow penduline tit is around 8 cm (3.1 in) in overall length and weighs 6–8 g (0.21–0.28 oz). It is olive-yellow above with bright yellow underparts and a dull greyish stripe through the eye. The upper wing is brown with feathers edged with yellow. The primaries are edged with buff-white which generates a narrow whitish wing panel. The tail is brown. The bird has a conical pointed bill and strong legs. The sexes are alike.
