= Venusia laria =

Scientific classification
- Domain: Eukaryota
- Kingdom: Animalia
- Phylum: Arthropoda
- Class: Insecta
- Order: Lepidoptera
- Family: Geometridae
- Genus: Venusia
- Species: V. laria

Binomial name
- Venusia laria Oberthür, 1893

Synonyms
- Discoloxia ilara Prout, 1938

Species of moth

Venusia laria is a moth in the family Geometridae first described by Charles Oberthür in 1893. It is found in China and Japan.

The wingspan is 17–21 mm.

== Subspecies ==
- Venusia laria laria (China)
- Venusia laria ilara (Prout, 1938) (Japan)
