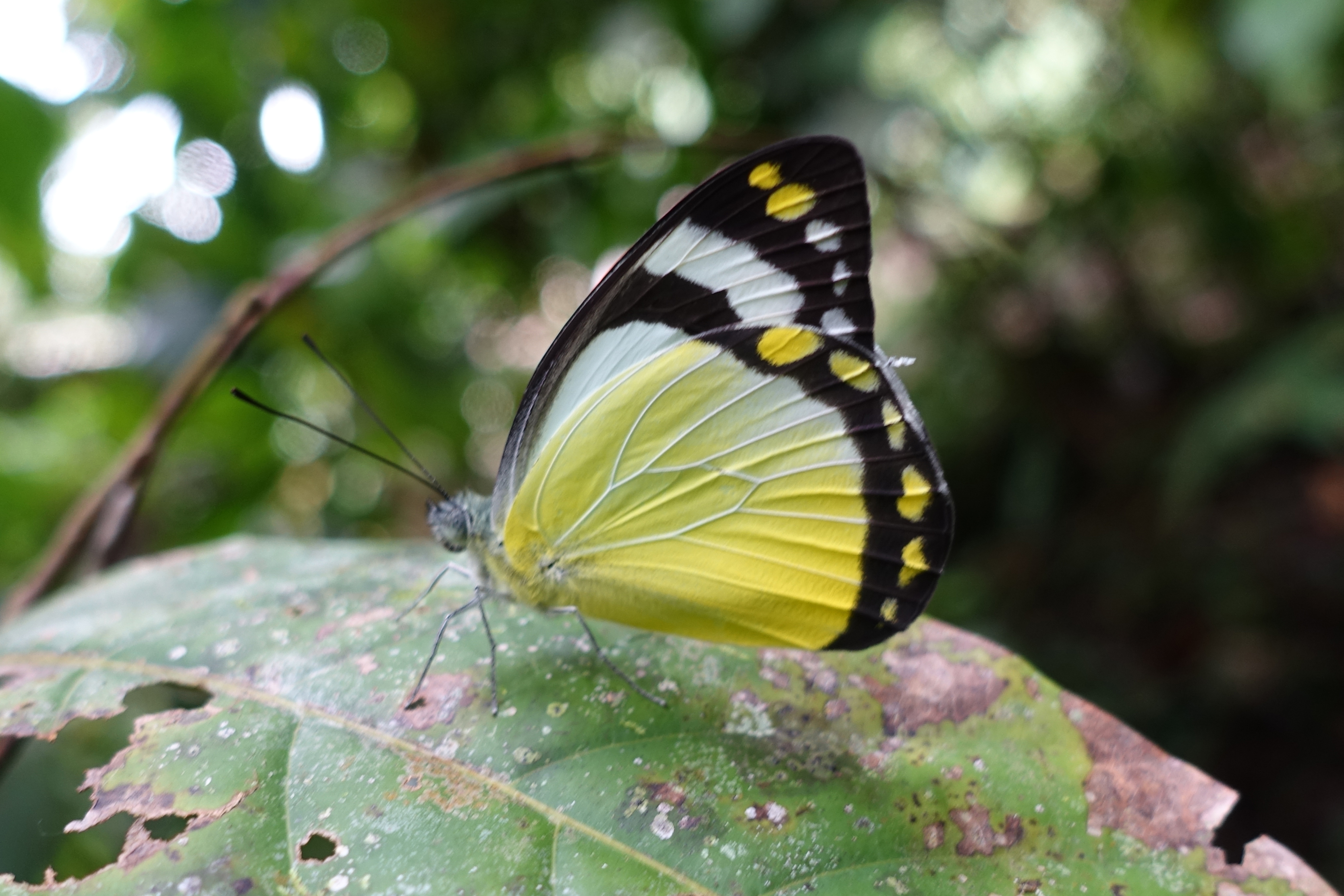
- Delias enniana contracta male

Scientific classification
- Kingdom: Animalia
- Phylum: Arthropoda
- Class: Insecta
- Order: Lepidoptera
- Family: Pieridae
- Genus: Delias
- Species: D. enniana

Binomial name
- Delias enniana (Oberthür, 1880)

Synonyms
- Pieris enniana Oberthür, 1880; Delias enniana f. kapaura Rothschild, 1915

= Delias enniana =

Species of butterfly

Delias enniana is a butterfly in the family Pieridae. It was described by Charles Oberthür in 1880. It is found in New Guinea.

== Description ==
Male: the upper surface white with sharply cut off, black distal margin to the forewing, which bears a few white dots. Female with black, mostly isolated transverse spot at the end of the cell, with fairly uniform black distal margin and mostly dull white upper surface to the forewing, upperside of the hindwing suffused with yellow.

== Subspecies ==
- D. e. enniana (western Irian Jaya)
- D. e. contracta Talbot, 1928 (Waigeu)
- D. e. hidehitoi Morita, 2003 (Salawati)
- D. e. obsoleta Rothschild, 1915 (Misool)
- D. e. majoripuncta Joicey & Talbot, 1922 (Numfoor Island)
- D. e. reducta Rothschild, 1915 (Eilanden River, south-eastern Irian Jaya, south-western Papua New Guinea)
- D. e. ecceicei Joicey & Talbot, 1916 (south-eastern Papua New Guinea)
