= Melanonaclia luctuosa =

Scientific classification
- Domain: Eukaryota
- Kingdom: Animalia
- Phylum: Arthropoda
- Class: Insecta
- Order: Lepidoptera
- Superfamily: Noctuoidea
- Family: Erebidae
- Subfamily: Arctiinae
- Genus: Melanonaclia
- Species: M. luctuosa

Binomial name
- Melanonaclia luctuosa (Oberthür, 1911)

Synonyms
- Naclia luctuosa Oberthür, 1911

Species of moth

Melanonaclia luctuosa is a moth of the subfamily Arctiinae. It was described by Oberthür in 1911. It is found in Madagascar.
