= Pyrausta thibetalis =

Scientific classification
- Domain: Eukaryota
- Kingdom: Animalia
- Phylum: Arthropoda
- Class: Insecta
- Order: Lepidoptera
- Family: Crambidae
- Genus: Pyrausta
- Species: P. thibetalis

Binomial name
- Pyrausta thibetalis Oberthür, 1886

Species of moth

Pyrausta thibetalis is a moth in the family Crambidae. It was described by Oberthür in 1886. It is found in China (Sichuan).
