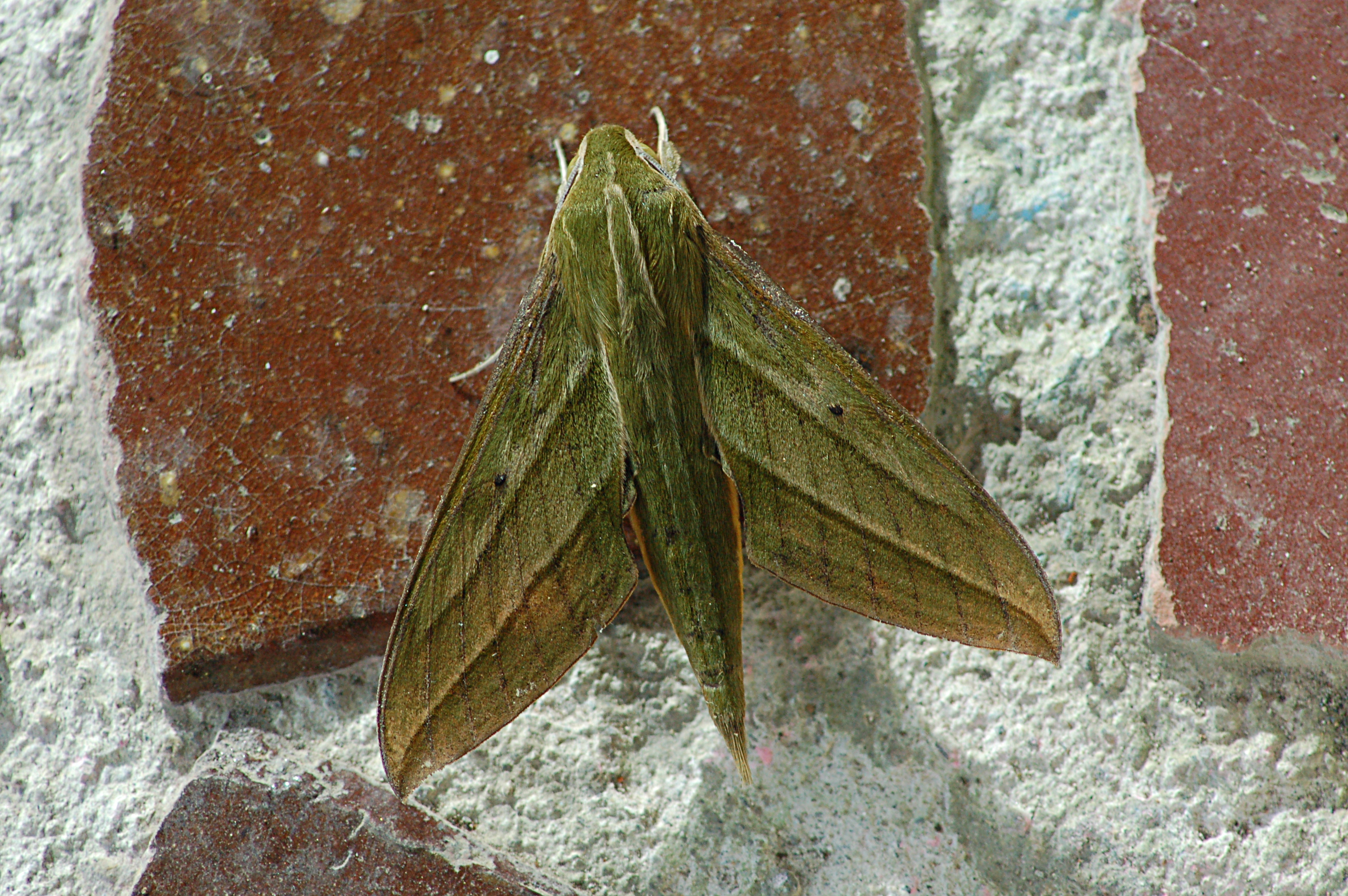

Scientific classification
- Domain: Eukaryota
- Kingdom: Animalia
- Phylum: Arthropoda
- Class: Insecta
- Order: Lepidoptera
- Family: Sphingidae
- Genus: Xylophanes
- Species: X. nabuchodonosor

Binomial name
- Xylophanes nabuchodonosor Oberthur, 1904

Synonyms
- Xylophanes caissa Gehlen, 1931

= Xylophanes nabuchodonosor =

Species of moth

Xylophanes nabuchodonosor is a moth of the family Sphingidae.

== Distribution ==
It is known from Bolivia and Peru.

== Description ==
The wingspan is 76–82 mm.

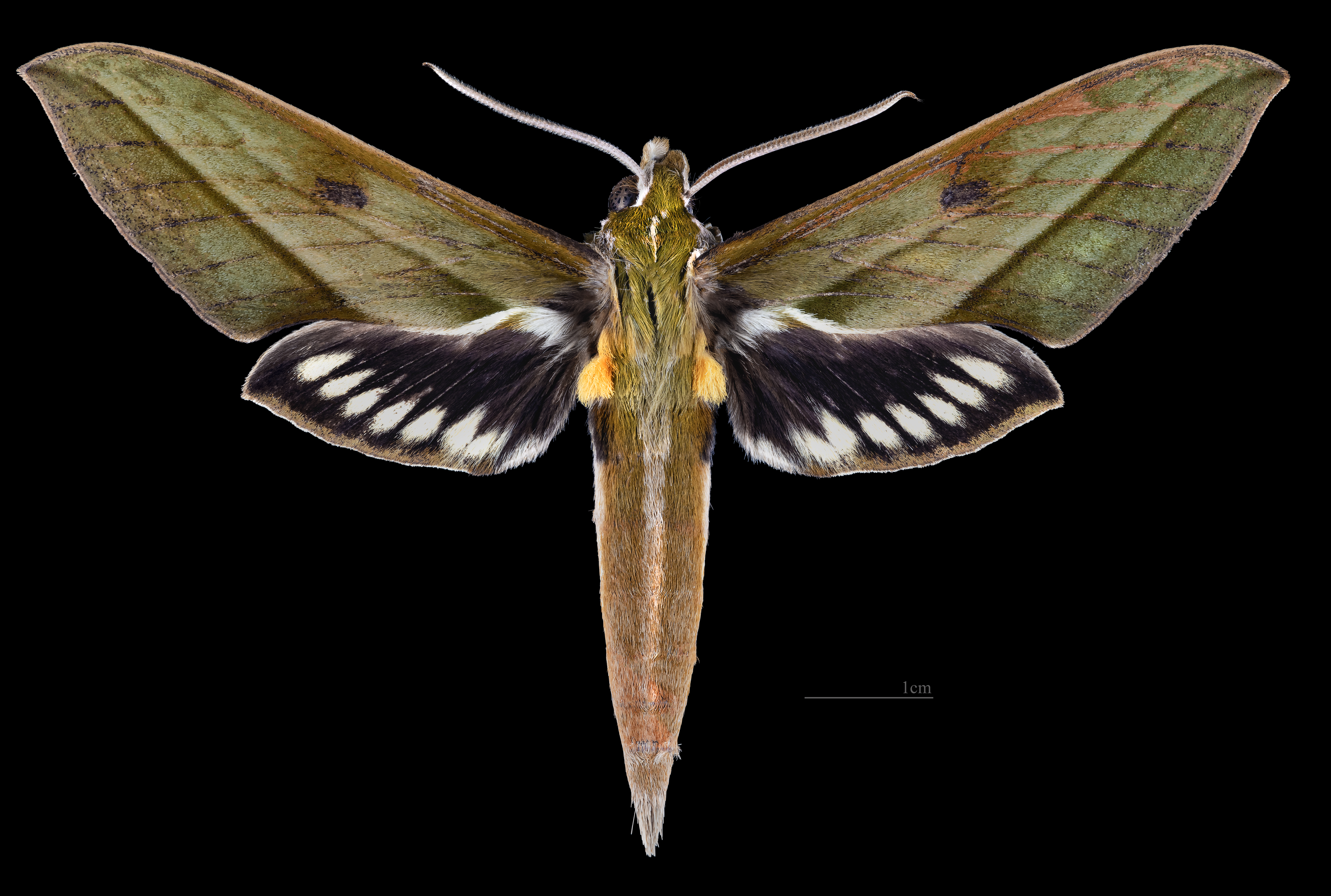
Xylophanes nabuchodonosor ♂

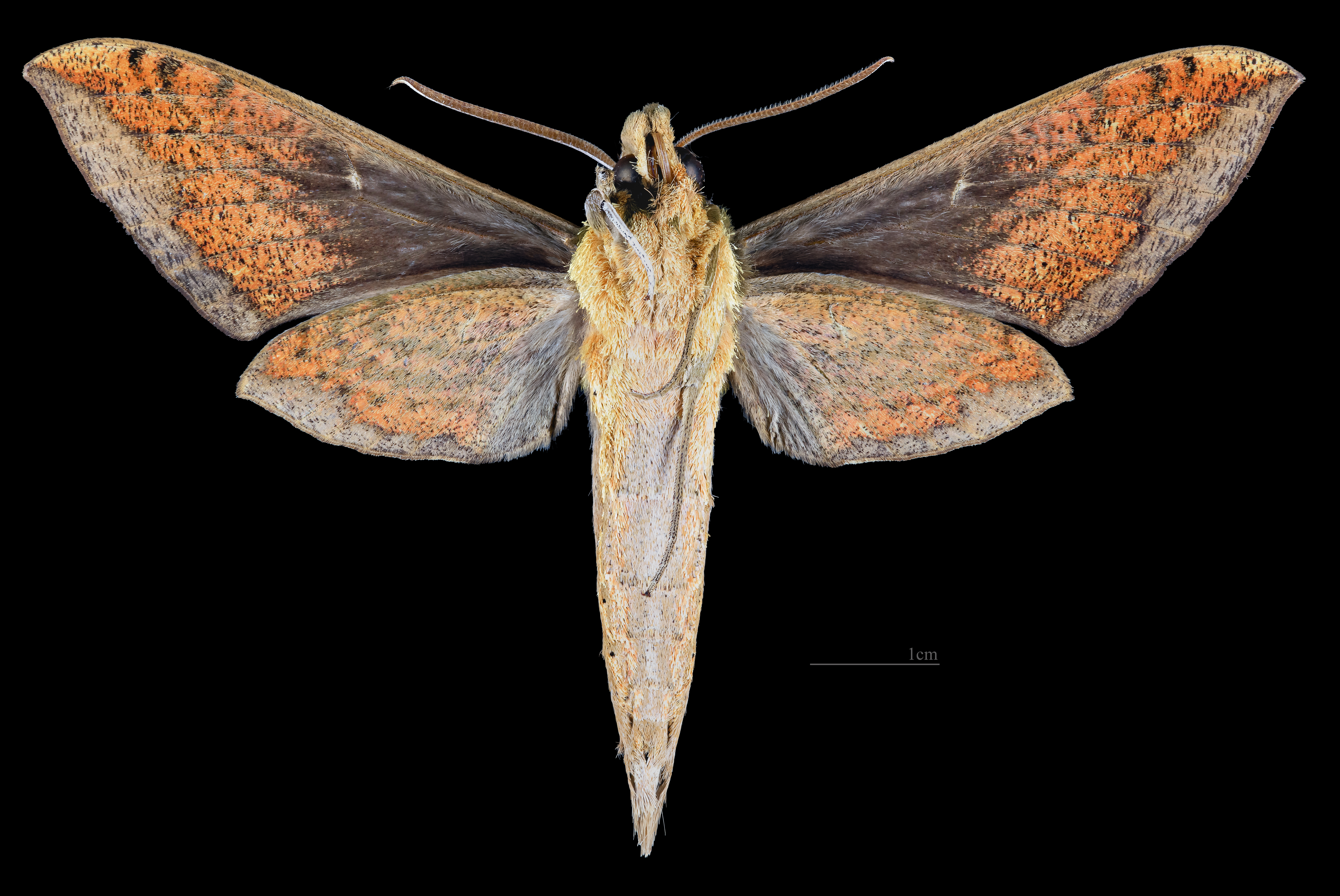
Xylophanes nabuchodonosor ♂ △

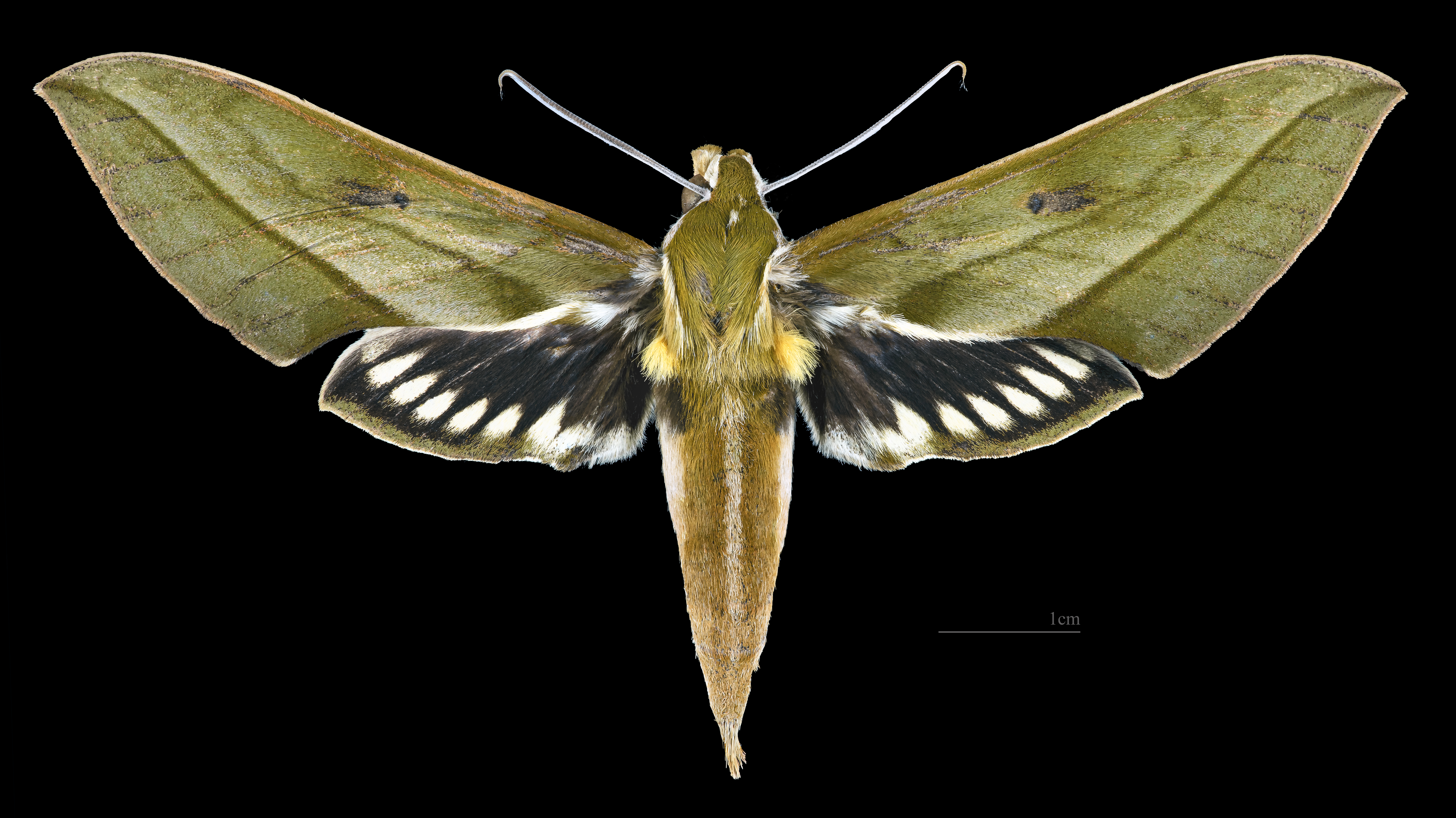
Xylophanes nabuchodonosor ♀

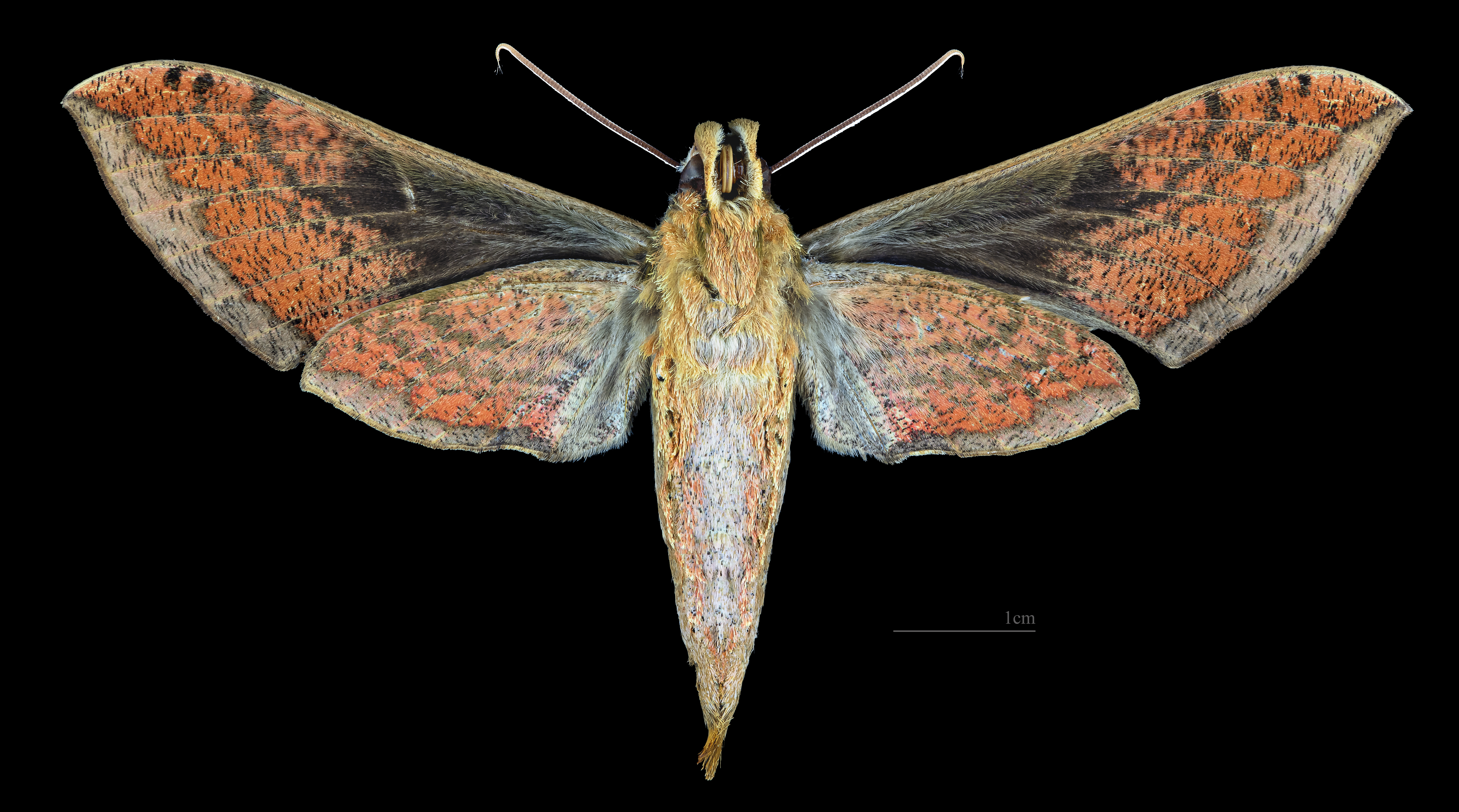
Xylophanes nabuchodonosor ♀ △
