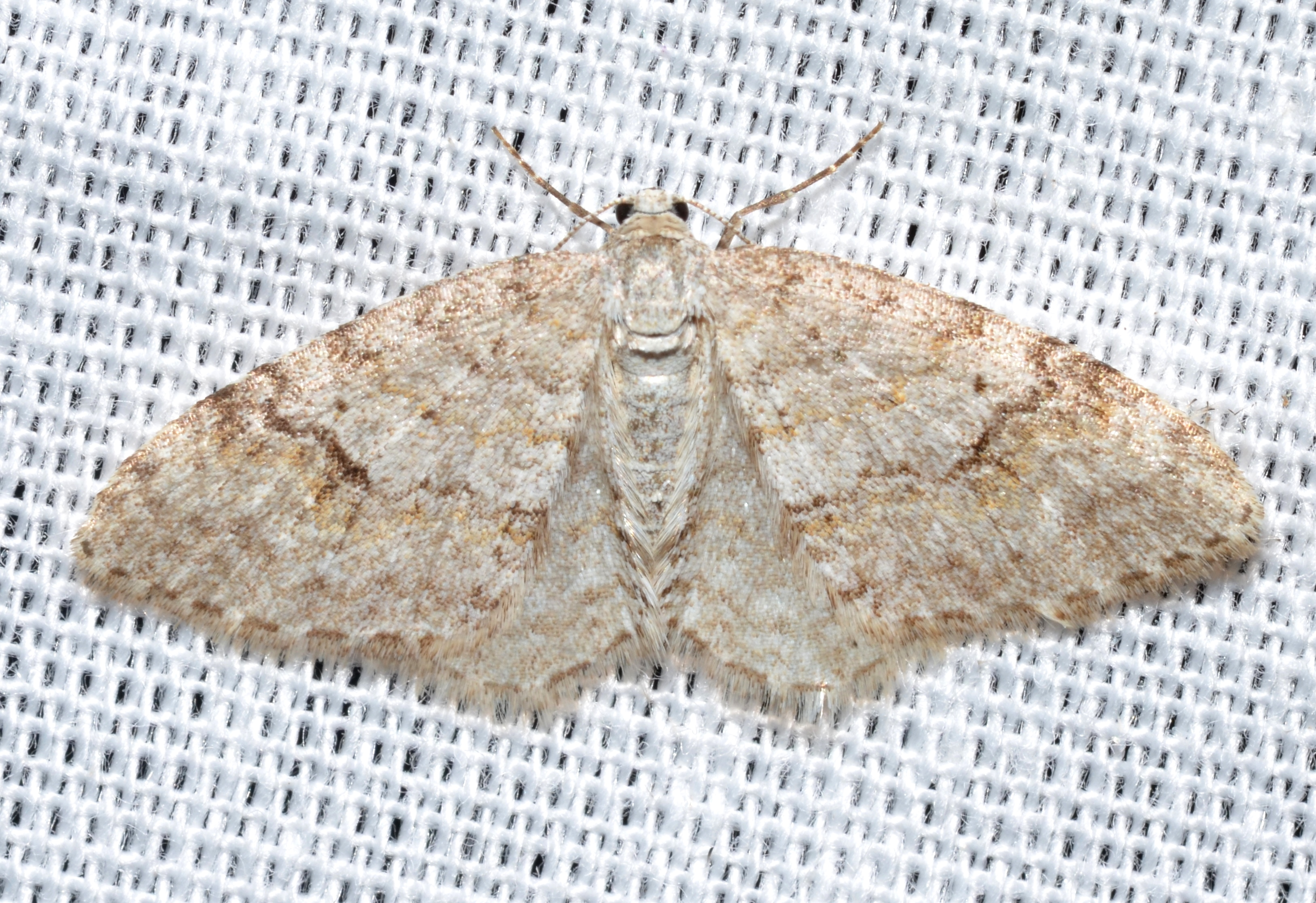
- venusia comptaria - Cuivre River State Park

Scientific classification
- Kingdom: Animalia
- Phylum: Arthropoda
- Class: Insecta
- Order: Lepidoptera
- Family: Geometridae
- Genus: Venusia
- Species: V. comptaria

Binomial name
- Venusia comptaria (Walker, 1860)

Synonyms
- Tephrosia comptaria Walker 1860; Venusia palumbes Franclemont, 1938; Larentia perlineata Packard, 1873; Euchoeca salienta Pearsall, 1905

= Venusia comptaria =

Species of moth

Venusia comptaria, the brown-shaded carpet moth, is a moth in the family Geometridae. The species was first described by Francis Walker in 1860. It is found in eastern North America, from Florida to Newfoundland, west to Manitoba. The habitat consists of woodlands.

The wingspan is about 20 mm.
