= Venusia dilecta =

Scientific classification
- Domain: Eukaryota
- Kingdom: Animalia
- Phylum: Arthropoda
- Class: Insecta
- Order: Lepidoptera
- Family: Geometridae
- Genus: Venusia
- Species: V. dilecta

Binomial name
- Venusia dilecta Yazaki, 1995

Species of moth

Venusia dilecta is a moth in the family Geometridae first described by Yazaki in 1995. It is found in Nepal.
