= Venusia lilacina =

Scientific classification
- Domain: Eukaryota
- Kingdom: Animalia
- Phylum: Arthropoda
- Class: Insecta
- Order: Lepidoptera
- Family: Geometridae
- Genus: Venusia
- Species: V. lilacina

Binomial name
- Venusia lilacina (Warren, 1893)

Synonyms
- Hydrelia lilacina Warren, 1893; Discoloxia rala Prout, 1938

Species of moth

Venusia lilacina is a moth in the family Geometridae first described by William Warren in 1893. It is found in China, Nepal and India.

== Subspecies ==
- Venusia lilacina lilacina (Sikkim, Nepal)
- Venusia lilacina melanogramma Wehrli, 1931 (China)
- Venusia lilacina rala (Prout, 1938) (Kashmir)
