= Venusia biangulata =

Scientific classification
- Domain: Eukaryota
- Kingdom: Animalia
- Phylum: Arthropoda
- Class: Insecta
- Order: Lepidoptera
- Family: Geometridae
- Genus: Venusia
- Species: V. biangulata

Binomial name
- Venusia biangulata (Sterneck, 1938)

Synonyms
- Discoloxia biangulata Sterneck, 1928

Species of moth

Venusia biangulata is a moth in the family Geometridae first described by Sterneck in 1938. It is found in China.
