= Venusia semistrigata =

Scientific classification
- Domain: Eukaryota
- Kingdom: Animalia
- Phylum: Arthropoda
- Class: Insecta
- Order: Lepidoptera
- Family: Geometridae
- Genus: Venusia
- Species: V. semistrigata

Binomial name
- Venusia semistrigata (Christoph, 1881)

Synonyms
- Cidaria semistrigata Christoph, 1881

Species of moth

Venusia semistrigata is a moth in the family Geometridae first described by Hugo Theodor Christoph in 1881. It is found in Russia and Japan.

The wingspan is 17–22 mm.

== Subspecies ==
- Venusia semistrigata semistrigata (Russian Far East, Japan)
- Venusia semistrigata expressa Inoue, 1963 (Japan)
