= Venusia pallidaria =

Scientific classification
- Kingdom: Animalia
- Phylum: Arthropoda
- Class: Insecta
- Order: Lepidoptera
- Family: Geometridae
- Genus: Venusia
- Species: V. pallidaria

Binomial name
- Venusia pallidaria Hampson, 1903

Species of moth

Venusia pallidaria is a moth in the family Geometridae first described by George Hampson in 1903. It is found in Pakistan.
