= Victor Planchat =

Victor Planchat (January 5, 1865 – July 5, 1901) was a French naturalist and specimen collector who worked with the French Colonial railways in Senegal. His specimens of insects and birds have been scattered around the world. Several taxa were described on the basis of his specimens.

== Life and work ==
Planchat was born in Saint-Oradoux-de-Chirouze (Creuse) in a modest family who was into farming and inn-keeping. After some education he joined the armed services and wjoined the 3rd Marine Infantry Regiment in 1886. He was posted to Indochina and reached Tonkin in 1889. He went to Colombo in 1889 and returned to Paris later in that year. He married in 1891 and moved to Senegal in 1893 where a daughter was born. He worked as a railways inspector and worked on the line between Dakar and Saint-Louis. He took a keen interest in natural history, making collections in Senegal. He contributed bird specimens which are now part of the Albert Maës (1846–1914) collection. He likely learned the art of skinning birds during his stay in Asia. It is thought that he sent specimens to the natural history trader W. F. H. Rosenberg who in turn sold it to collectors. He sent insects to René Oberthür and some bird skins and eggs to Adolph Nehrkorn. His specimen labels make use of the very poorly documented Ajami script in addition to French. He was a quiet, withdrawn, and a teetotaler. Along with his family he made visits to France for health, making use of the available leave of 3 months for every two years of service, and died following a fever at the age of 36.
