= Venusia obliquisigna =

Scientific classification
- Domain: Eukaryota
- Kingdom: Animalia
- Phylum: Arthropoda
- Class: Insecta
- Order: Lepidoptera
- Family: Geometridae
- Genus: Venusia
- Species: V. obliquisigna

Binomial name
- Venusia obliquisigna (Moore, 1888)

Synonyms
- Cidaria obliquisigna Moore, 1888

Species of moth

Venusia obliquisigna is a moth in the family Geometridae first described by Frederic Moore in 1888. It is found in India, Nepal and China.
