= Melanonaclia =

Scientific classification
- Domain: Eukaryota
- Kingdom: Animalia
- Phylum: Arthropoda
- Class: Insecta
- Order: Lepidoptera
- Superfamily: Noctuoidea
- Family: Erebidae
- Subfamily: Arctiinae
- Genus: Melanonaclia; Griveaud, 1964

Genus of moths

Melanonaclia is a genus of moths in the subfamily Arctiinae.

== Species ==
- Melanonaclia luctuosa (Oberthür, 1911)
- Melanonaclia lugens Oberthür, 1893
- Melanonaclia moerens Oberthür, 1911
- Melanonaclia nigra Griveaud, 1964
- Melanonaclia perplexa Griveaud, 1964
- Melanonaclia toulgoeti Griveaud, 1964
