= Venusia purpuraria =

Scientific classification
- Kingdom: Animalia
- Phylum: Arthropoda
- Class: Insecta
- Order: Lepidoptera
- Family: Geometridae
- Genus: Venusia
- Species: V. purpuraria

Binomial name
- Venusia purpuraria (Hampson, 1895)

Synonyms
- Hydrelia purpuraria Hampson, 1895

Species of moth

Venusia purpuraria is a moth in the family Geometridae first described by George Hampson in 1895. It is found in India.
