= Oberthur Technologies =

French digital security company

- Formerly: Oberthur Card Systems
- Company type: Private
- Industry: Electronics
- Predecessor: Oberthur Printing Works
- Founded: 1984
- Founder: Jean-Pierre Savare
- Defunct: 28 September 2017
- Fate: Merged with Morpho to form IDEMIA
- Headquarters: Paris, France
- Area served: Worldwide
- Key people: Pascal Stefani (Chairman); Didier Lamouche (CEO); Anne-France Laclide (CFO); Frédéric Beylier (COO)
- Products: Chips; Passports; Smart cards
- Revenue: ▲€3.0 billion (2016)
- Operating income: ▲€104.1 million (2010); €92.2 million (2009)
- Net income: ▲€59.7 million (2010); €49.2 million (2009)
- Number of employees: 14,000 (2016) (2013)
- Divisions: Card Systems; Identity
- Website: www.oberthur.com

Oberthur Technologies was a French digital security company, providing secure technology solutions for Smart Transactions, Mobile Financial Services, Machine-to-Machine, Digital Identity and Transport & Access Control. As of 2008, Oberthur's revenue was €882 million. Oberthur Technologies was the successor of the Oberthur printing which was founded in 1842 by the master printer and lithographer, François-Charles Oberthür. Oberthur merged with Morpho to form IDEMIA on 28 September 2017.

== History ==
- 1842 Oberthur was founded by printer and lithographer François-Charles Oberthür
- 1984 Jean-Pierre Savare takes over security printing activity for François-Charles Oberthur Fiduciaire
- 1985 Creation of François-Charles Oberthur Card Systems
- 1990 Acquisition of Banknote of America Corporation
- 1991 Creation of François-Charles Oberthur Chèque et Sécurité
- 1993 Acquisition of Axytrans, France
- 1997 Creation of Oberthur Smart Cards
- 1999 Acquisition of De La Rue Card Systems and creation of Oberthur Card Systems
- 2000 Oberthur Card Systems IPO
- 2001 Opening factory in China
- 2001 Acquisition of Logica, Spain
- 2002 Acquisition of Rapsodia, France
- 2004 Opening of factory in Brazil
- 2005 Acquisition of Africard, SA
- 2006 Opening of factory in India
- 2006 Opening of software development center Oberthur Technologies Romania SRL in Bucharest which employs approximately 50 people
- 2007 Acquisition of I’M Technologies, Singapore
- 2007 Creation of Oberthur Technologies
- 2008 Acquisition of XPonCard, Sweden
- 2008 Delisting from the stock exchange
- 2011 Buy out of the Card Systems and Identity Division (Oberthur Technologies) to Advent International. The Secure Printing Division and Cash Protection are renamed Oberthur Fiduciaire and remained under the Savare family control.
- 2012 Acquisition of MoreMagic, a leading mobile money solution provider
- 2012 Acquisition of Cupola Plastic Cards in Dubai, a major smart card manufacturer and personalisation services provider for the Middle East

== See also ==
- Oberthur Cash Protection
