= Venusia eucosma =

Scientific classification
- Kingdom: Animalia
- Phylum: Arthropoda
- Clade: Pancrustacea
- Class: Insecta
- Order: Lepidoptera
- Family: Geometridae
- Genus: Venusia
- Species: V. eucosma

Binomial name
- Venusia eucosma (L. B. Prout, 1914)

Synonyms
- Discoloxia eucosma Prout, 1914

Species of moth

Venusia eucosma is a moth in the family Geometridae first described by Louis Beethoven Prout in 1914. It is found in China.
