= Venusia nigrifurca =

Scientific classification
- Kingdom: Animalia
- Phylum: Arthropoda
- Clade: Pancrustacea
- Class: Insecta
- Order: Lepidoptera
- Family: Geometridae
- Genus: Venusia
- Species: V. nigrifurca

Binomial name
- Venusia nigrifurca (Prout, 1926)

Synonyms
- Discoloxia nigrifurca Prout, 1926

Species of moth

Venusia nigrifurca is a moth in the family Geometridae first described by Louis Beethoven Prout in 1926. It is found in China and Myanmar.
