= Venusia ochrota =

Scientific classification
- Kingdom: Animalia
- Phylum: Arthropoda
- Class: Insecta
- Order: Lepidoptera
- Family: Geometridae
- Genus: Venusia
- Species: V. ochrota

Binomial name
- Venusia ochrota Hampson, 1903

Synonyms
- Venusia roseicosta Yazaki, 1994

Species of moth

Venusia ochrota is a moth in the family Geometridae first described by George Hampson in 1903. It is found in Nepal and China.
