= Venusia distrigaria =

Scientific classification
- Domain: Eukaryota
- Kingdom: Animalia
- Phylum: Arthropoda
- Class: Insecta
- Order: Lepidoptera
- Family: Geometridae
- Genus: Venusia
- Species: V. distrigaria

Binomial name
- Venusia distrigaria (Boisduval, 1833)

Synonyms
- Geometra distrigaria Boisduval, 1833

Species of moth

'Venusia' distrigaria is a moth in the family Geometridae first described by Jean Baptiste Boisduval in 1833. It is found on Madagascar.

== Taxonomy ==
The identity and generic placement of this species are unclear.
