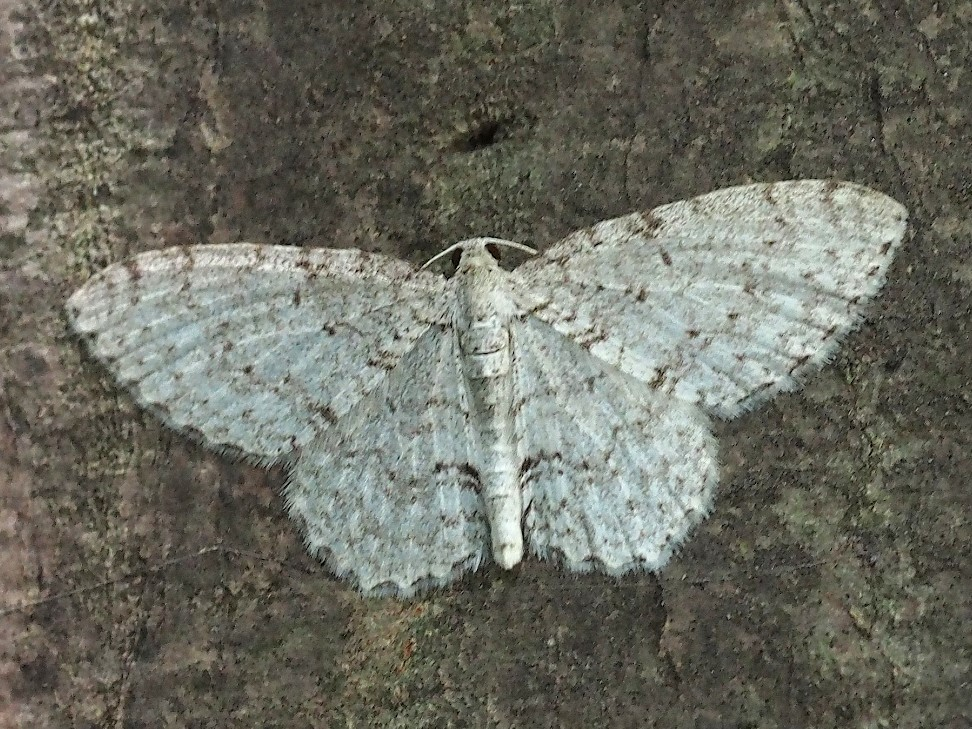

Scientific classification
- Domain: Eukaryota
- Kingdom: Animalia
- Phylum: Arthropoda
- Class: Insecta
- Order: Lepidoptera
- Family: Geometridae
- Genus: Venusia
- Species: V. phasma

Binomial name
- Venusia phasma (Butler, 1879)

Synonyms
- Emmelesia phasma Butler, 1879

= Venusia phasma =

Species of moth

Venusia phasma is a species of moth in the family Geometridae that was first described by Arthur Gardiner Butler in 1879. It is found in Japan.

The wingspan is 16–20 mm.
