= Venusia albinea =

Scientific classification
- Kingdom: Animalia
- Phylum: Arthropoda
- Clade: Pancrustacea
- Class: Insecta
- Order: Lepidoptera
- Family: Geometridae
- Genus: Venusia
- Species: V. albinea

Binomial name
- Venusia albinea (L. B. Prout, 1938)

Synonyms
- Discoloxia albinea Prout, 1938

Species of moth

Venusia albinea is a moth in the family Geometridae first described by Louis Beethoven Prout in 1938. It is found in Pakistan.
