= Venusia conisaria =

Scientific classification
- Kingdom: Animalia
- Phylum: Arthropoda
- Class: Insecta
- Order: Lepidoptera
- Family: Geometridae
- Genus: Venusia
- Species: V. conisaria

Binomial name
- Venusia conisaria Hampson, 1903

Synonyms
- Discoloxia hypoconia Prout, 1938

Species of moth

Venusia conisaria is a moth in the family Geometridae first described by George Hampson in 1903. It is found in China, Nepal and India.

== Subspecies ==
- Venusia conisaria conisaria (China, Nepal, Sikkim)
- Venusia conisaria hypoconia (Prout, 1938) (Kashmir)
