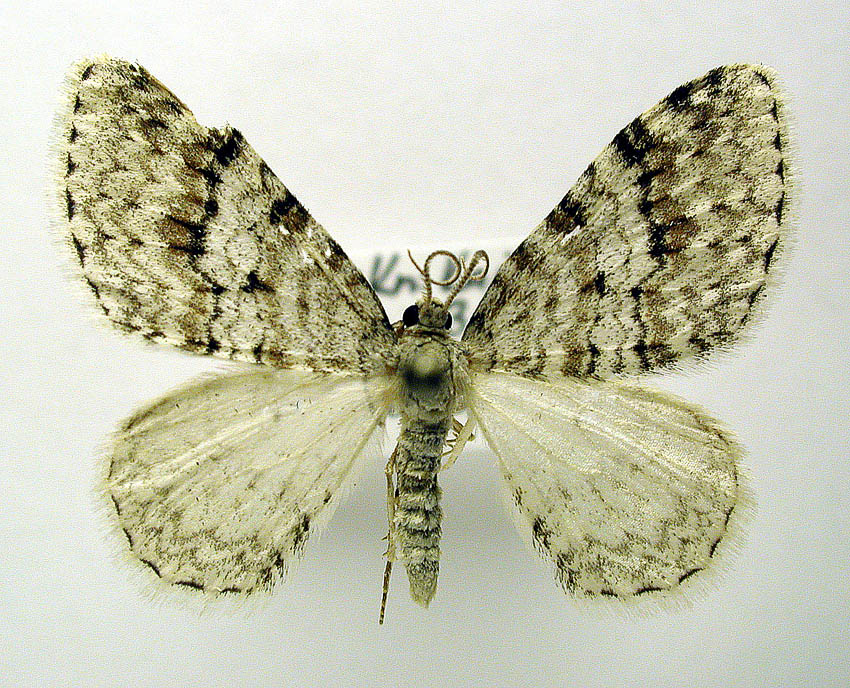
- Venusia cambrica

Scientific classification
- Kingdom: Animalia
- Phylum: Arthropoda
- Class: Insecta
- Order: Lepidoptera
- Family: Geometridae
- Subfamily: Larentiinae
- Tribe: Asthenini
- Genus: Venusia; Curtis, 1839

Synonyms
- Discoloxia Warren, 1895

= Venusia (moth) =

Genus of moths

Venusia is a genus of moths in the family Geometridae erected by John Curtis in 1839.

== Species ==
- Venusia accentuata (Prout, 1914)
- Venusia albinea (Prout, 1938)
- Venusia apicistrigaria (Djakonov, 1936)
- Venusia balausta Xue, 1999
- Venusia biangulata (Sterneck, 1938)
- Venusia blomeri (Curtis, 1832)
- Venusia brevipectinata Prout, 1938
- Venusia cambrica Curtis, 1839
- Venusia comptaria (Walker, 1860)
- Venusia conisaria Hampson, 1903
- Venusia crassisigna Inoue, 1987
- Venusia dilecta Yazaki, 1995
- Venusia distrigaria (Boisduval, 1833)
- Venusia eucosma (Prout, 1914)
- Venusia inefficax (Prout, 1938)
- Venusia kasyata Wiltshire, 1966
- Venusia kioudjrouaria Oberthür, 1893
- Venusia laria Oberthür, 1893
- Venusia lilacina (Warren, 1893)
- Venusia limata Inoue, 1982
- Venusia lineata Wileman, 1916
- Venusia maniata Xue, 1999
- Venusia marmoraria (Leech, 1897)
- Venusia megaspilata (Warren, 1895)
- Venusia naparia Oberthür, 1893
- Venusia nigrifurca (Prout, 1926)
- Venusia obliquisigna (Moore, 1888)
- Venusia ochrota Hampson, 1903
- Venusia pallidaria Hampson, 1903
- Venusia paradoxa Xue, 1999
- Venusia pearsalli (Dyar, 1906)
- Venusia phasma (Butler, 1879)
- Venusia planicaput Inoue, 1987
- Venusia punctiuncula Prout, 1938
- Venusia purpuraria (Hampson, 1895)
- Venusia scitula Xue, 1999
- Venusia semistrigata (Christoph, 1881)
- Venusia sikkimensis (Warren, 1893)
- Venusia syngenes Wehrli, 1931
- Venusia tchraria Oberthür, 1893
- Venusia violettaria Wehrli, 1931
- Venusia yasudai Inoue, 1987

== Status unclear ==
- Venusia participata (Sauter, 1869), described as Eupithecia participata from East Prussia. It is sometimes attributed to Grentzenberg instead of Sauter.
