= Venusia marmoraria =

Scientific classification
- Domain: Eukaryota
- Kingdom: Animalia
- Phylum: Arthropoda
- Class: Insecta
- Order: Lepidoptera
- Family: Geometridae
- Genus: Venusia
- Species: V. marmoraria

Binomial name
- Venusia marmoraria (Leech, 1897)

Synonyms
- Hydrelia marmoraria Leech, 1897

Species of moth

Venusia marmoraria is a moth in the family Geometridae first described by John Henry Leech in 1897. It is found in China.
