= Venusia sikkimensis =

Scientific classification
- Domain: Eukaryota
- Kingdom: Animalia
- Phylum: Arthropoda
- Class: Insecta
- Order: Lepidoptera
- Family: Geometridae
- Genus: Venusia
- Species: V. sikkimensis

Binomial name
- Venusia sikkimensis (Warren, 1893)

Synonyms
- Hydrelia sikkimensis Warren, 1893

Species of moth

Venusia sikkimensis is a moth in the family Geometridae first described by William Warren in 1893. It can be found in Bhutan, Nepal, India and China.
