= Venusia balausta =

Scientific classification
- Domain: Eukaryota
- Kingdom: Animalia
- Phylum: Arthropoda
- Class: Insecta
- Order: Lepidoptera
- Family: Geometridae
- Genus: Venusia
- Species: V. balausta

Binomial name
- Venusia balausta Xue, 1999

Species of moth

Venusia balausta is a moth in the family Geometridae first described by Dayong Xue in 1999. It is found in China.
