= Venusia apicistrigaria =

Scientific classification
- Domain: Eukaryota
- Kingdom: Animalia
- Phylum: Arthropoda
- Class: Insecta
- Order: Lepidoptera
- Family: Geometridae
- Genus: Venusia
- Species: V. apicistrigaria

Binomial name
- Venusia apicistrigaria (Djakonov, 1936)

Synonyms
- Discoloxia apicistrigaria Djakonov, 1936

Species of moth

Venusia apicistrigaria is a moth in the family Geometridae first described by Alexander Michailovitsch Djakonov in 1936. It is found in China.
