= Venusia accentuata =

Scientific classification
- Kingdom: Animalia
- Phylum: Arthropoda
- Clade: Pancrustacea
- Class: Insecta
- Order: Lepidoptera
- Family: Geometridae
- Genus: Venusia
- Species: V. accentuata

Binomial name
- Venusia accentuata (L. B. Prout, 1914)

Synonyms
- Discoloxia accentuata Prout, 1914

Species of moth

Venusia accentuata is a moth in the family Geometridae first described by Louis Beethoven Prout in 1914. It is found in China.
