= Venusia punctiuncula =

Scientific classification
- Kingdom: Animalia
- Phylum: Arthropoda
- Clade: Pancrustacea
- Class: Insecta
- Order: Lepidoptera
- Family: Geometridae
- Genus: Venusia
- Species: V. punctiuncula

Binomial name
- Venusia punctiuncula L. B. Prout, 1938

Species of moth

Venusia punctiuncula is a moth in the family Geometridae first described by Louis Beethoven Prout in 1938. It is found in China.
