= Venusia limata =

Scientific classification
- Kingdom: Animalia
- Phylum: Arthropoda
- Class: Insecta
- Order: Lepidoptera
- Family: Geometridae
- Genus: Venusia
- Species: V. limata

Binomial name
- Venusia limata Inoue, 1982

Species of moth

Venusia limata is a moth in the family Geometridae first described by Hiroshi Inoue in 1982. It is found in Nepal.
