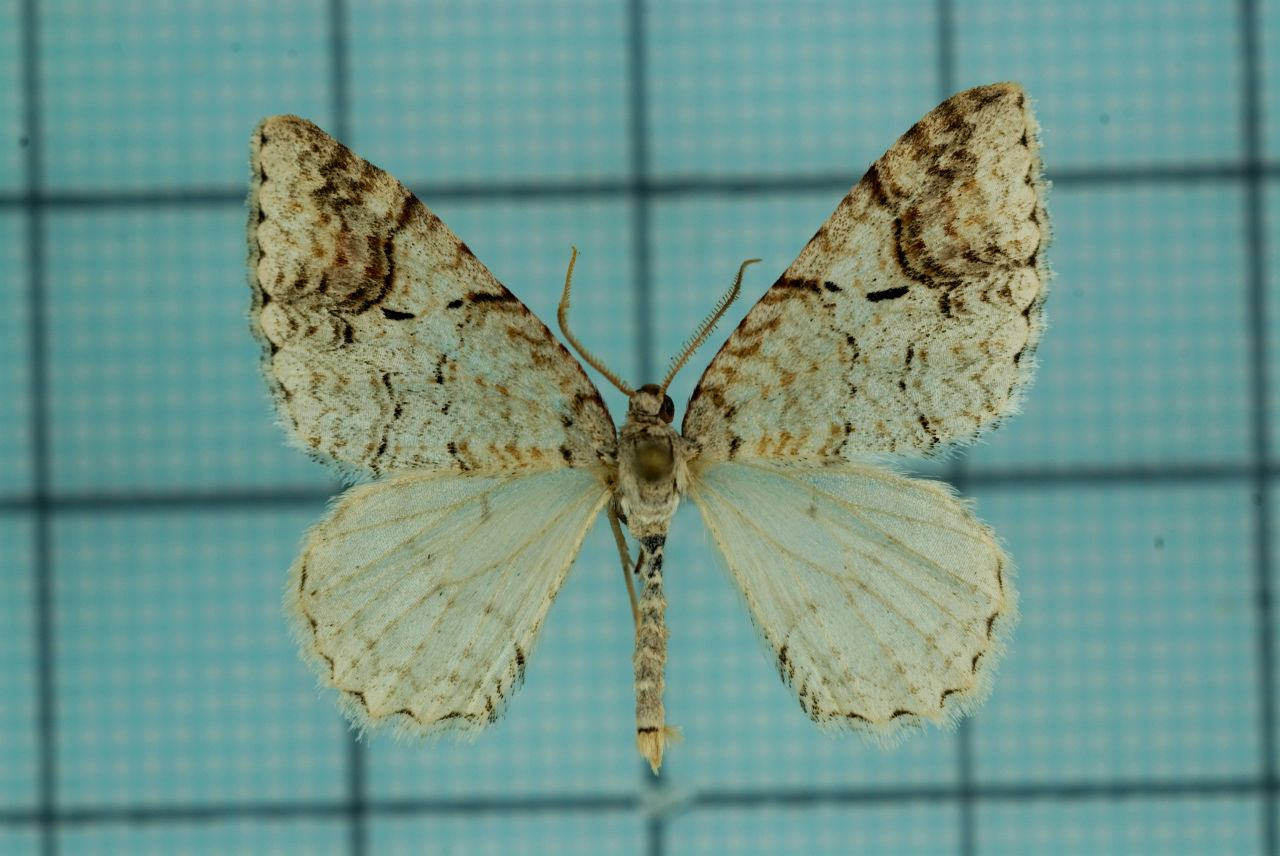

Scientific classification
- Kingdom: Animalia
- Phylum: Arthropoda
- Class: Insecta
- Order: Lepidoptera
- Family: Geometridae
- Genus: Venusia
- Species: V. lineata

Binomial name
- Venusia lineata Wileman, 1916

= Venusia lineata =

Species of moth

Venusia lineata is a species of moth of the family Geometridae. It is found in Taiwan.
