= Venusia crassisigna =

Scientific classification
- Kingdom: Animalia
- Phylum: Arthropoda
- Class: Insecta
- Order: Lepidoptera
- Family: Geometridae
- Genus: Venusia
- Species: V. crassisigna

Binomial name
- Venusia crassisigna Inoue, 1987

Species of moth

Venusia crassisigna is a moth in the family Geometridae first described by Hiroshi Inoue in 1987. It is found in Nepal and China.
