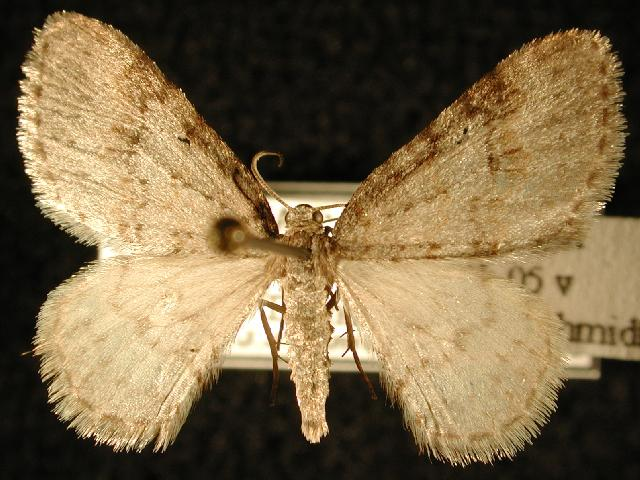

Scientific classification
- Kingdom: Animalia
- Phylum: Arthropoda
- Class: Insecta
- Order: Lepidoptera
- Family: Geometridae
- Genus: Venusia
- Species: V. pearsalli

Binomial name
- Venusia pearsalli (Dyar, 1906)

Synonyms
- Euchoeca pearsalli Dyar, 1906

= Venusia pearsalli =

Species of moth

Venusia pearsalli, or Pearsall's carpet moth, is a moth in the family Geometridae. The species was first described by Harrison Gray Dyar Jr. in 1906. It is found in western North America, from Alaska, Alberta and British Columbia, through Washington and Oregon to California.

The wingspan is about 21 mm. The forewings are pale grey with rows of narrow black lines. Adults are on wing in spring.

The larvae feed on Acer circinatum, Alnus incana tenuifolia, Alnus rubra, Alnus viridis sinuata, Betula, Cornus nuttalli, Quercus garryana, Crataegus, Malus, Populus tremuloides, Populus trichocarpa and Salix.
