= Venusia megaspilata =

Scientific classification
- Domain: Eukaryota
- Kingdom: Animalia
- Phylum: Arthropoda
- Class: Insecta
- Order: Lepidoptera
- Family: Geometridae
- Genus: Venusia
- Species: V. megaspilata

Binomial name
- Venusia megaspilata (Warren, 1895)

Synonyms
- Discoloxia megaspilata Warren, 1895

Species of moth

Venusia megaspilata is a moth in the family Geometridae first described by William Warren in 1895. It is found in Japan and Korea.

The wingspan is about 17 mm.
