= Venusia kasyata =

Scientific classification
- Kingdom: Animalia
- Phylum: Arthropoda
- Class: Insecta
- Order: Lepidoptera
- Family: Geometridae
- Genus: Venusia
- Species: V. kasyata

Binomial name
- Venusia kasyata Wiltshire, 1966

Species of moth

Venusia kasyata is a moth in the family Geometridae first described by Wiltshire in 1966. It is found in Afghanistan.
