= Venusia brevipectinata =

Scientific classification
- Kingdom: Animalia
- Phylum: Arthropoda
- Clade: Pancrustacea
- Class: Insecta
- Order: Lepidoptera
- Family: Geometridae
- Genus: Venusia
- Species: V. brevipectinata

Binomial name
- Venusia brevipectinata L. B. Prout, 1938

Species of moth

Venusia brevipectinata is a moth in the family Geometridae first described by Louis Beethoven Prout in 1938. It is found in India.
