= Venusia inefficax =

Scientific classification
- Kingdom: Animalia
- Phylum: Arthropoda
- Clade: Pancrustacea
- Class: Insecta
- Order: Lepidoptera
- Family: Geometridae
- Genus: Venusia
- Species: V. inefficax

Binomial name
- Venusia inefficax (L. B. Prout, 1938)

Synonyms
- Discoloxia inefficax Prout, 1938

Species of moth

Venusia inefficax is a moth in the family Geometridae first described by Louis Beethoven Prout in 1938. It is found in China.
