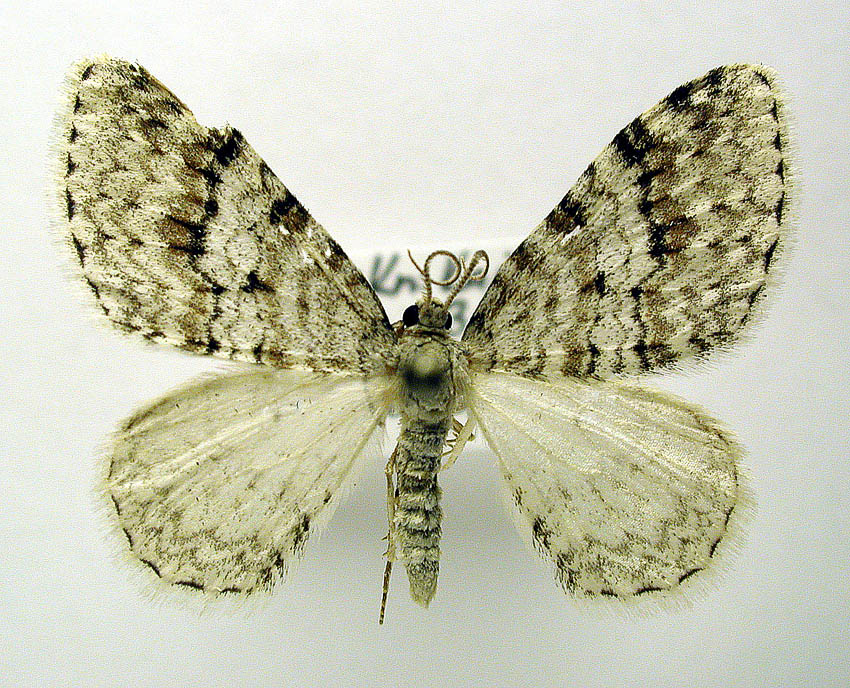

Scientific classification
- Kingdom: Animalia
- Phylum: Arthropoda
- Clade: Pancrustacea
- Class: Insecta
- Order: Lepidoptera
- Family: Geometridae
- Genus: Venusia
- Species: V. cambrica

Binomial name
- Venusia cambrica Curtis, 1839

Synonyms
- Venusia cambrica shuotsu Bryk, 1949; Venusia cambricaria Guenée, [1858]; Hydrelia cambricata Herrich-Schäffer, 1861; Eubolia erutaria Boisduval, 1840; Acidalia nebulosaria Freyer, 1850; Tephrosia scitularia Walker, 1860

= Venusia cambrica =

Welsh wave

Species of moth

Venusia cambrica, the Welsh wave, is a moth of the family Geometridae. It is found in Europe, western and central Siberia, Altai, Transbaikalia, the Russian Far East, the Korean Peninsula, Japan and in North America, where it can be found across Canada from Newfoundland and Labrador to British Columbia, south in the west to California, south in the east to Georgia.

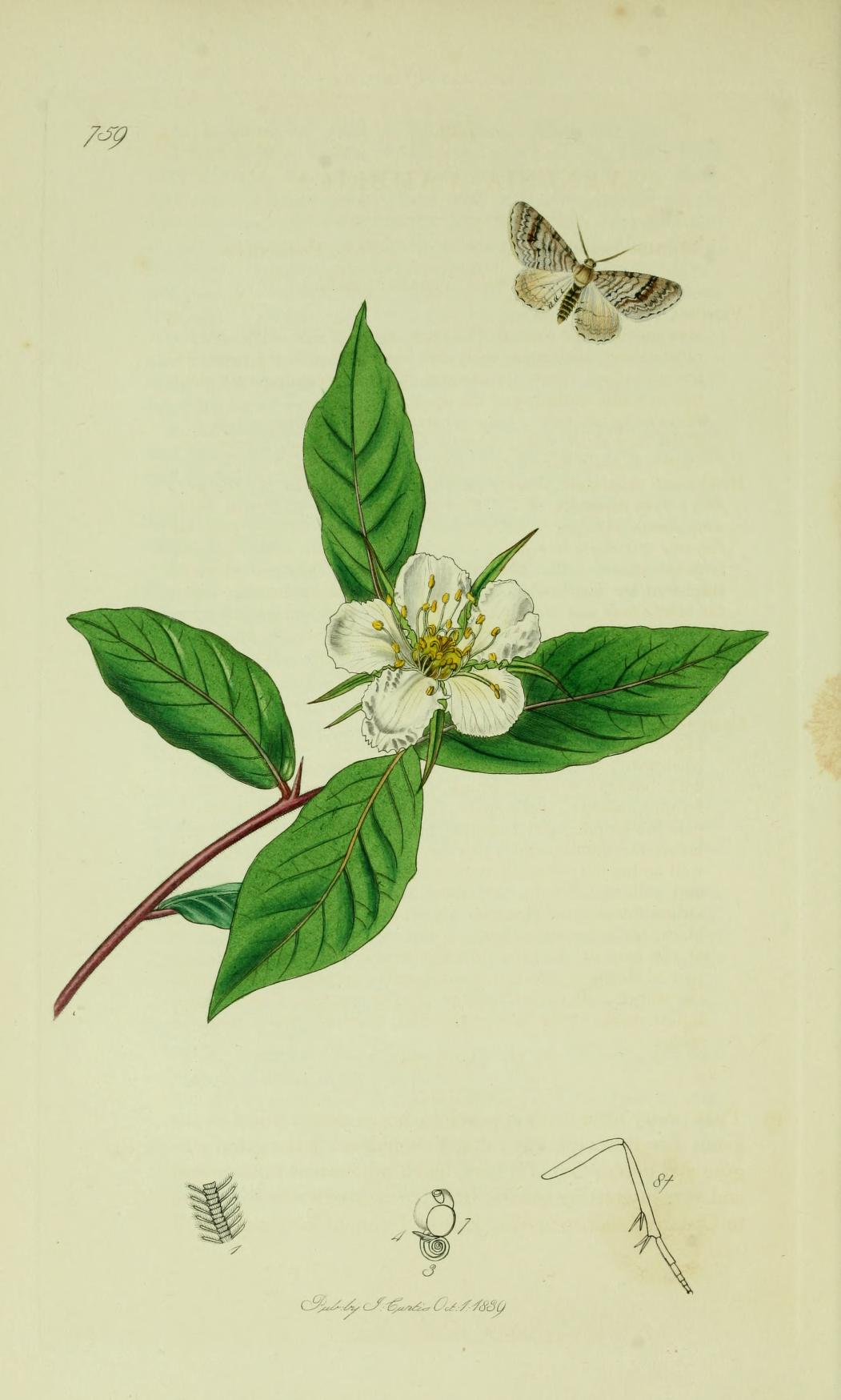
Illustration from John Curtis's British Entomology Volume 6

The wingspan is 27–30 mm. The light grey front wing has black and brown cross lines. Two protruding black lines at the outer black cross line, near the middle of the wing, are the most striking characteristic. "Quite distinct. The black marks on the 3rd radial and 1st median distally to the outer line recall Oporinia. English specimens and (according to Herz) the Korean form are on an average rather less white, than those from Scotland and continental Europe. In general the female is slightly larger and paler than the male - ab. pygmaea Tystr. is small with the central area constricted. - ab. latefasciata Strand has the median area very broad, the lines which bound it are parallel, not approximated in the posterior part. - ab. webbi Prout has the markings almcst obliterated excepting at the costal margin and on the median vein and its branches, recalling Oporinia antumnata gueneata See Oporinia gueneata -ab. bradyi Prout has both wings uniformly suffused with dark smoke-colour, and is becoming frequent in the Sheffield district. -ab. lofthousei Prout is a quite different melanotic form from ab. bradyi; forewing suffused with smoke-colour but remaining longitudinally rayed with white in the distal area, hindwing not infuscated. Only known from North Yorkshire. The larva is long and slender, with a few short setae. It is green with large, purple spots on the back and sides.

Adults are on wing from July to August in western Europe, from June to September in New Brunswick and Quebec and from March to August in California. There are two generations per year.

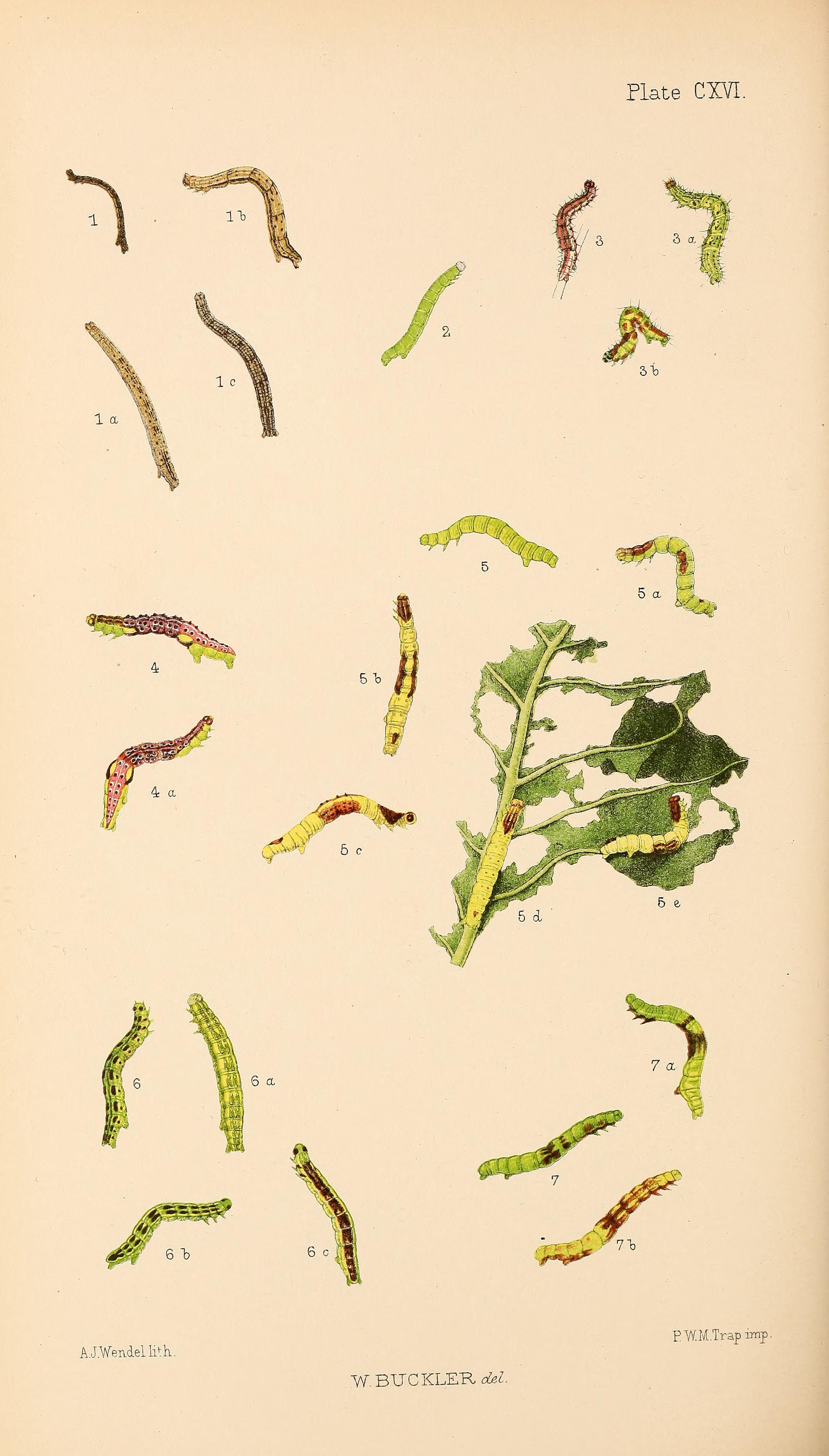
Figs. 7,7a,7b Larva after final moult

The larvae feed on the leaves of Sorbus aucuparia. Other recorded food plants include alder, apple, birch, mountain ash, serviceberry and willow.

== Subspecies ==
- Venusia cambrica cambrica (Holarctic region)
- Venusia cambrica aphrodite Bryk, 1942 (Russia: Kuriles)
