= Emmanuel Martin =

French entomologist

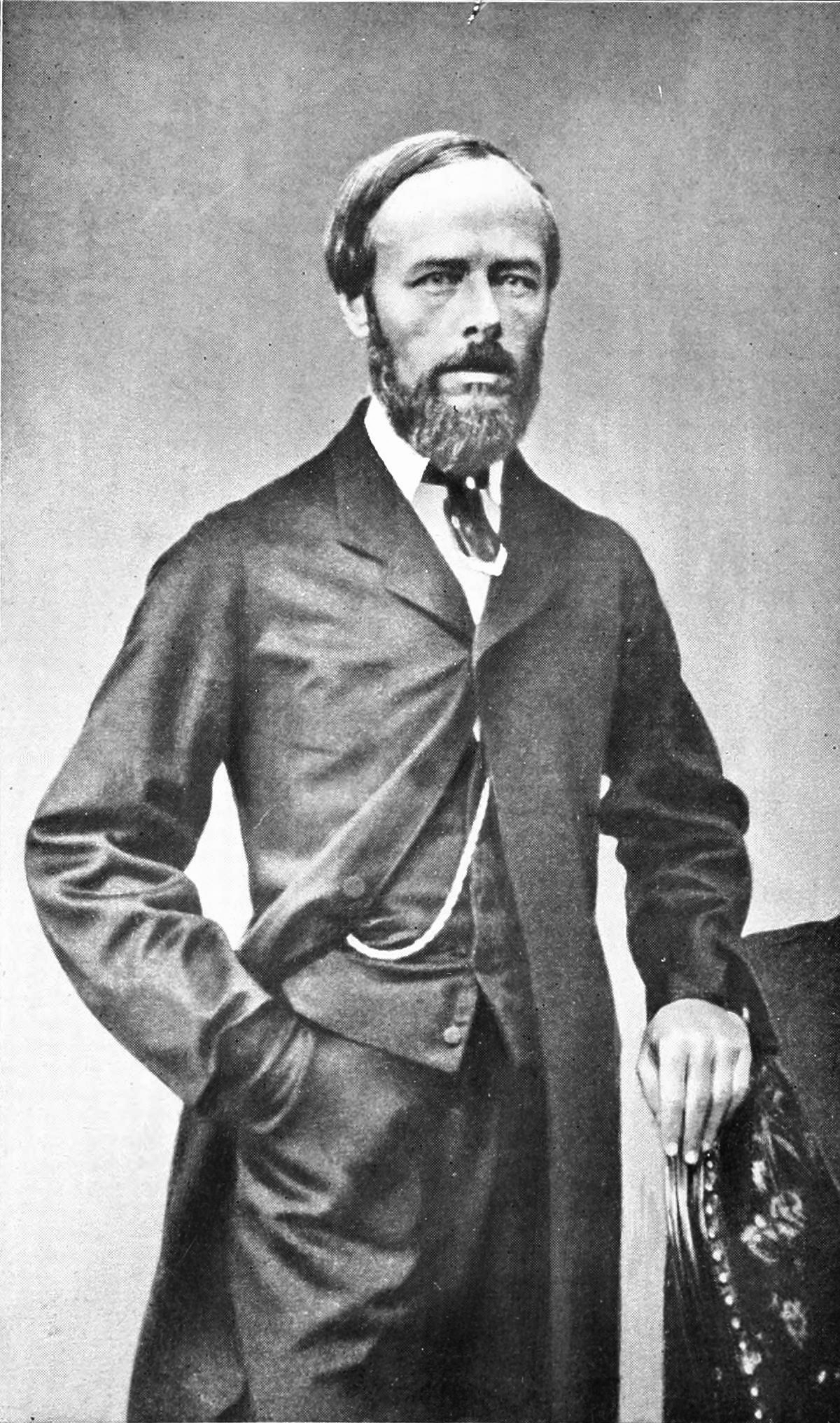
Emmanuel Martin

Emmanuel Martin (1827, Paris – 1897, Creil) was a French entomologist specialising in Lepidoptera.
