= François-Charles Oberthür =

French printer, businessman and amateur entomologist (1818–1893)

François-Charles Oberthür (French pronunciation: [fʁɑ̃swa ʃaʁl obɛʁtyʁ]; 1818, Strasbourg – 1893) was the founder of the French printing group Imprimerie Oberthur (fr). In Strasbourg, François-Charles, an engraver, ran a printing press, with Alois Senefelder, the inventor of lithography. He moved to Rennes in 1838, qualified as a lithographer in 1842 and then founded a printing company, with a partner. He became the sole owner in 1855, calling his enterprise the Imprimerie Oberthür.

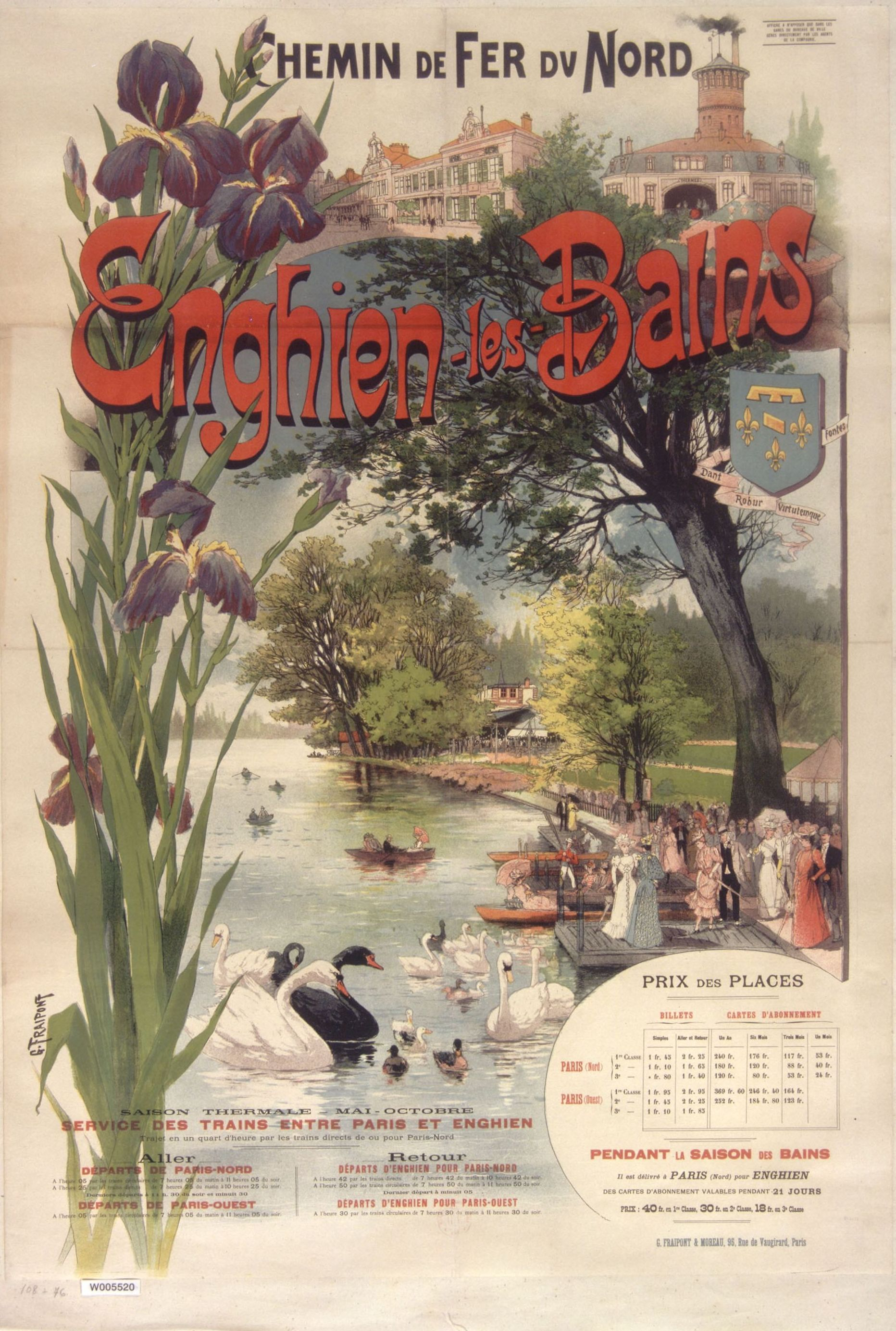
Chemin de Fer du Nord

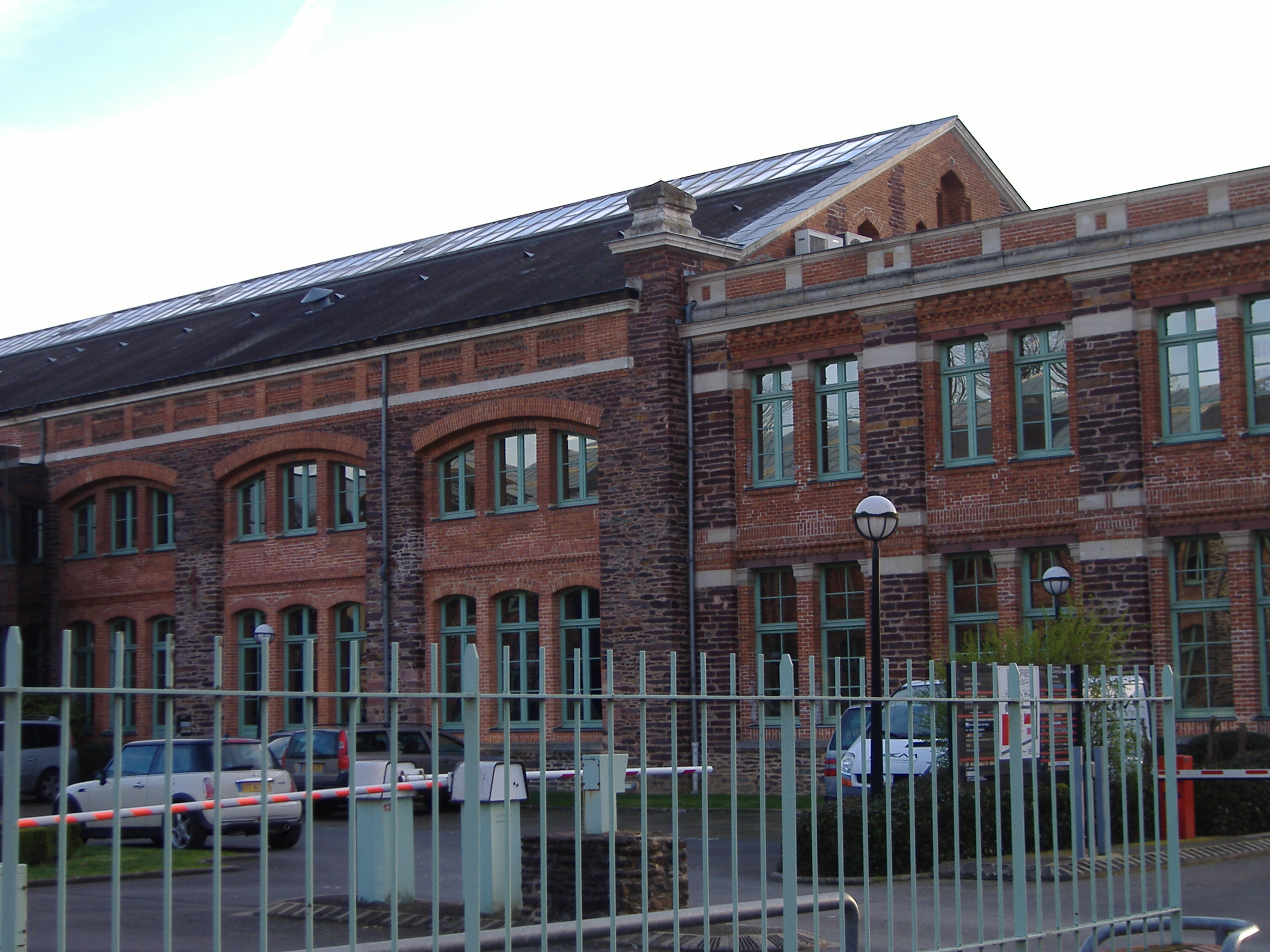
imprimeries Oberthur

Imprimerie Oberthür was the exclusive printer for Compagnie des Chemins de Fer de l'Ouest (Western Railway Company), published the first French telephone directory publisher and the "Almanach des Postes" Post Office almanac. These became a huge success, bringing cheap but very high quality art printing to many thousands of families across France. The press also specialized in colour plates featuring flowers, butterflies and beetles. François-Charles Oberthür also devised the French standard reference for tints.

He was an amateur entomologist specialising in Lepidoptera especially Zygaenidae and Lycaenidae. He had two sons René Oberthür and Charles Oberthür. Both became entomologists. The Oberthur house, n° 82 de la rue de Paris, is preserved in Rennes and a "jardin anglais" in Rennes is named for him.

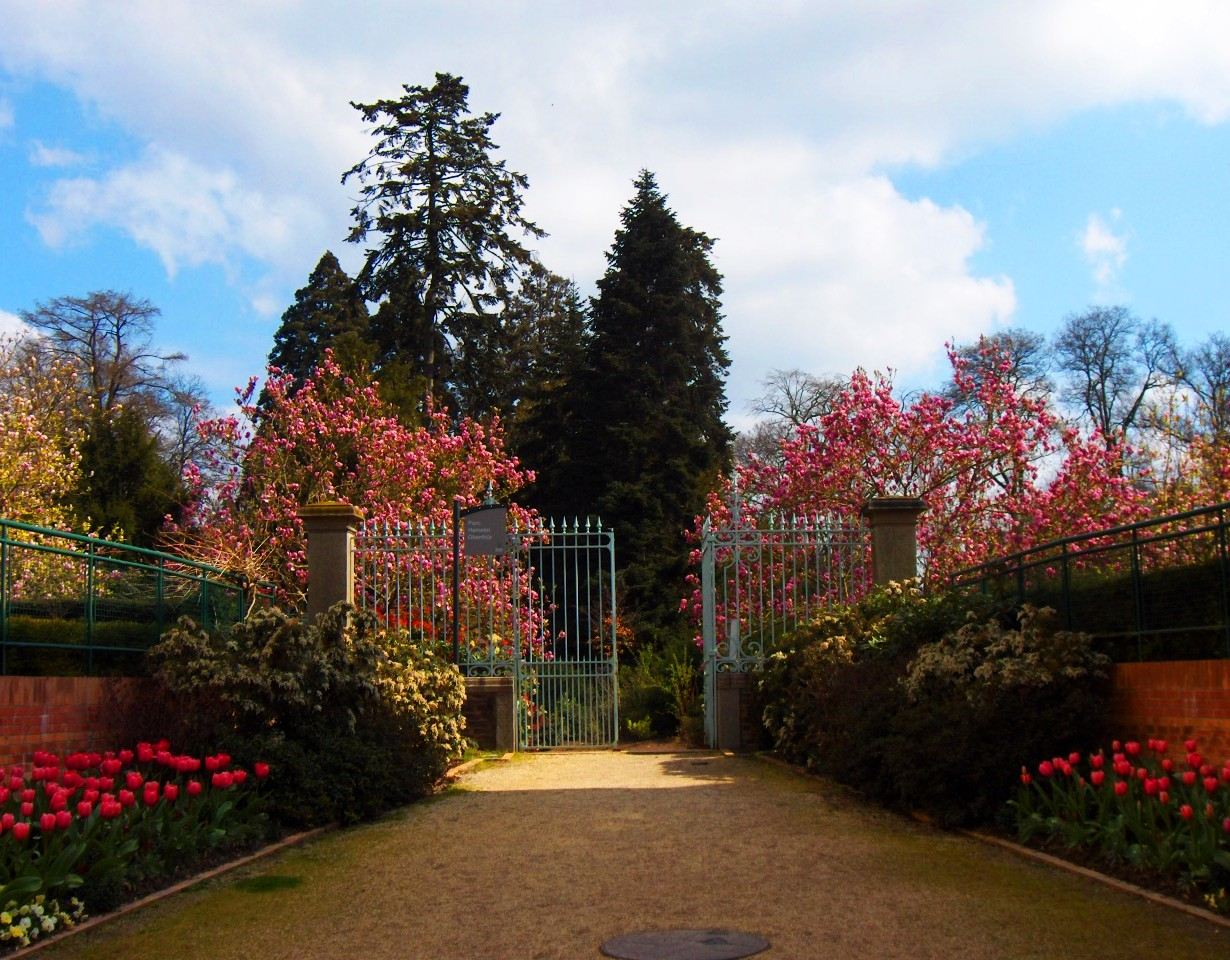
Parc Oberthur

== See also ==
- Oberthur Technologies, a modern French company created after partitioning and regrouping of original Imprimerie Oberthur.
