= Antoine Barthélemy Jean Guillemot =

French entomologist (1822–1902)

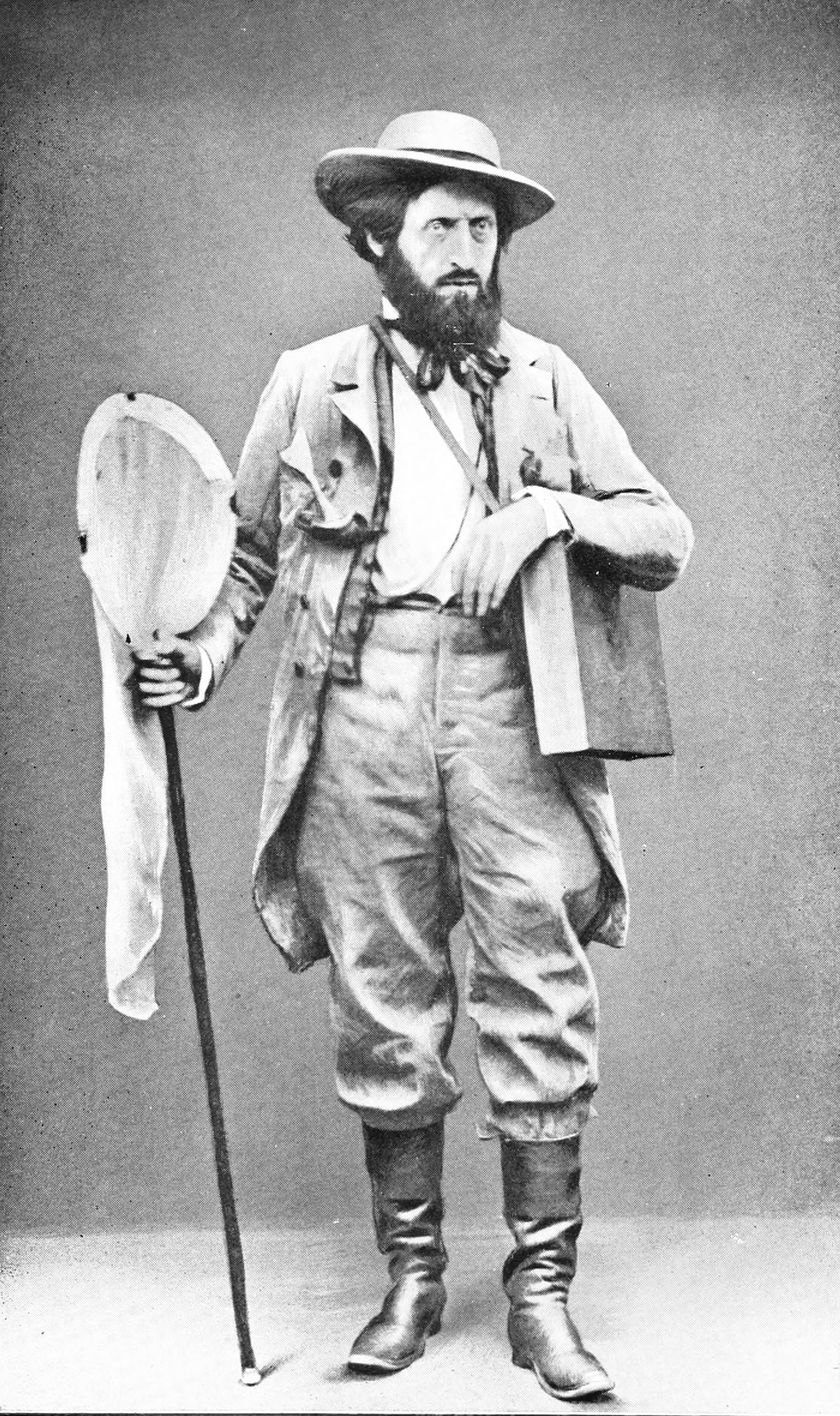
Antoine Guillemot

Antoine Barthélemy Jean Guillemot (French: [ɑ̃twan baʁtelemi ʒɑ̃ ɡijmo]; 11 November 1822, Thiers – 25 August 1902, Thiers) was a French entomologist.

He wrote Catalogue des lépidoptères du Département du Puy-de-Dôme Clermont-Ferrand, Impr. de Thibaud-Landriot published in 1854 online at BHL Antoine Guillemot was a member of the Société entomologique de France.
