= Oberthur Cash Protection =

- Formerly: Axytrans
- Company type: Private company
- Industry: Technology
- Founded: 1983; 43 years ago
- Headquarters: Paris, France
- Number of locations: Dijon and Paris
- Products: IBNS, ICSD, CC, CCL, ATV
- Owner: Oberthur Fiduciaire
- Number of employees: 66 (2011)
- Website: www.oberthurcp.com

Oberthur Cash Protection is a French manufacturer of intelligent banknote neutralisation systems to protect cash, based in Dijon, France. Established in 1985, the company holds one of the first IBNS patents to protect valuables by neutralizing them with ink and, as of 2011, is the largest manufacturer of such systems in the world, with over 60,000 systems installed.

== History ==
In 1983 Oberthur Cash Protection (operating as Axytrans, part of Axytel - a company specialized in the design and manufacture of credit cards and checks) invented the first intelligent banknote neutralisation systems to protect cash-in-transit using ink as a degradation agent. The invention was made in collaboration with one of Axytrans' customers, a French cash-in-transit company VALTIS, who was searching for alternative way to protect valuables during Cash-in-transit The product, called ATV (Axytrans Transport de Valeurs) was first used in 1990 by the Belgium Post for their Cash-in-transit operation. In 1991 French law was modified to allow use of ATV on an experimental basis and the French CIT company VALTIS started using it to service three regional banks.

In 1990 the post of Belgium officially addressed Oberthur Cash Protection over the Belgian Ministry of Interior for the implementation of IBNS for the transport of cash in unarmored vehicles. In 1991 the French CIT company VALTIS started using the ATV to service three regional banks.

In 1993 Axytrans was purchased by Group François-Charles Oberthur.

In 2003 the firm introduced its first Intelligent Banknote Neutralisation System to protect cash inside of the ATM.

In 2007 the firm acquired Fluiditi, a part of the NCR group, specializing in ATM cash protection and changed its name to Oberthur Cash Protection.

In 2011 the Card Systems and Identity Division of Oberthur Technologies was bought out by Advent International. The Secure Printing Division and Cash Protection are renamed Oberthur Fiduciaire and remained under the Savare family control.

== Products ==
Oberthur Cash Protection manufacturers Intelligent Banknote Neutralisation Systems (IBNS) – security systems which protect valuables by marking them as stolen with indelible security ink during Cash-in-transit, inside of retail machines, and ATMs. Such systems are often called “intelligent” because they are self-monitored and independently take actions based on a number of criteria and pre-programmed modes.

The firm's customers are major CIT companies (G4S, Loomis, Brinks, Prosegur), banks (Travelex, HBOS, Credit Agricole, BNP Paribas, Credit du Nord, BPCE, Banque Postale, Banque de France, Barclays, Royal Bank of Canada, CIBC, Swedbank, Raiffeisen Bank International, and others), and ATM manufacturers (NCR, Wincor Nixdorf, Diebold, retailers, and others) The company has more than 60, 000 Intelligent Banknote Neutralisation Systems in circulation in more than 15 countries in Europe, Africa and Oceania (Australia, New Zealand). As of 2011 the company employs 66 people at three sites: Paris, Dijon and Dundee (Great Britain).
