= René Oberthür =

French entomologist (1852–1944)

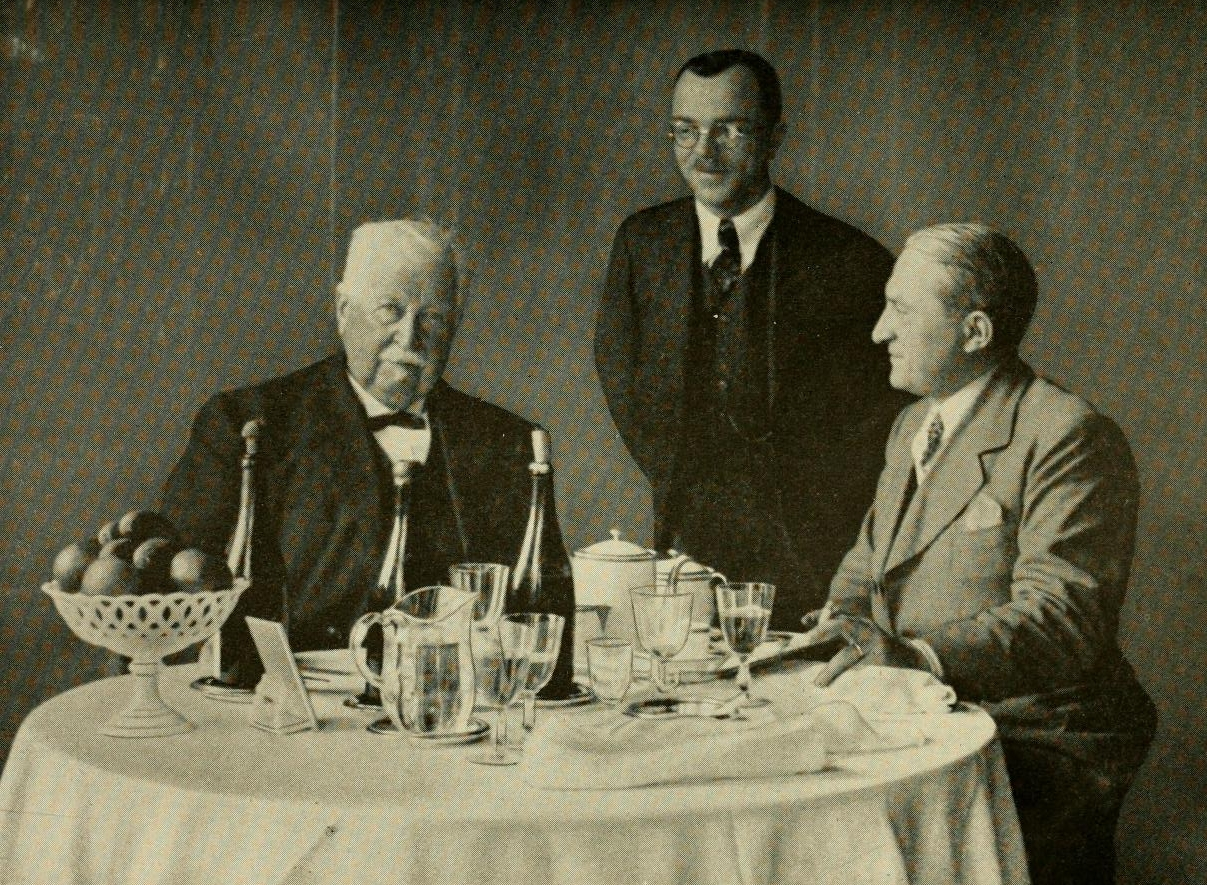
Rene Oberthur (left) in Rennes on 18 October 1936 with Victor Swinnen (standing) and Friedrich F. Tippmann (right)

René Oberthür (1852, Rennes – 27 April 1944) was a French entomologist who specialised in Coleoptera. With his brother Charles Oberthür he worked in "Imprimerie Oberthür" the very successful printing business founded by his father François-Charles Oberthür. René and Charles supplied free bibles, missals, catechisms and other printwork to missionaries in exchange for insect specimens. In addition they purchased on a large scale, acquiring almost all the large collections sold during their lifetime.

== Works ==
- Coleopterorum Novitates- Recueil spécialement consacré à l'étude des Coléoptères, Tome (Volume) 1 (1883)(the only published part of an intended series). Very few copies of this 80 page work, published by René himself, were printed and it ends abruptly.René Oberthür contributed "Scaphidides nouveaux"; "Nouvelles espèces de Monommides"; "Trois Nebria nouvelles"; "Un Coptolabrus nouveau"; "Carabiques récoltés à Saint-Laurent-du Maroni par Nodier"; "Deux espèces nouvelles de Geotrupides"; "Trois espèces nouvelles du genre Helota"; "Deux espèces nouvelles du genre Lemodes" There were only two other contributors Maximilien Chaudoir "Carabiques nouveaux" and Léon Fairmaire Note sur le genre Chalaenus and Espèces nouvelles d'Hétéromères de Madagascar.
- with C. Houlbert (1913) Lucanides de Java. Insecta; revue illustree d'Entomologie, Rennes 4 parts (1913–1914)-includes (1914) Catalogue systematique des lucanides considered somme ayant ete trouves dans l'ile de Java.

== Collection ==
His collections are conserved by Muséum national d'histoire naturelle (5 million specimens in 20,000 cases) Museum Koenig and Museo Civico di Storia Naturale di Genova (Indomalayan and Papua Coleoptera).
