= Charles Oberthür (entomologist) =

French entomologist (1845–1924)

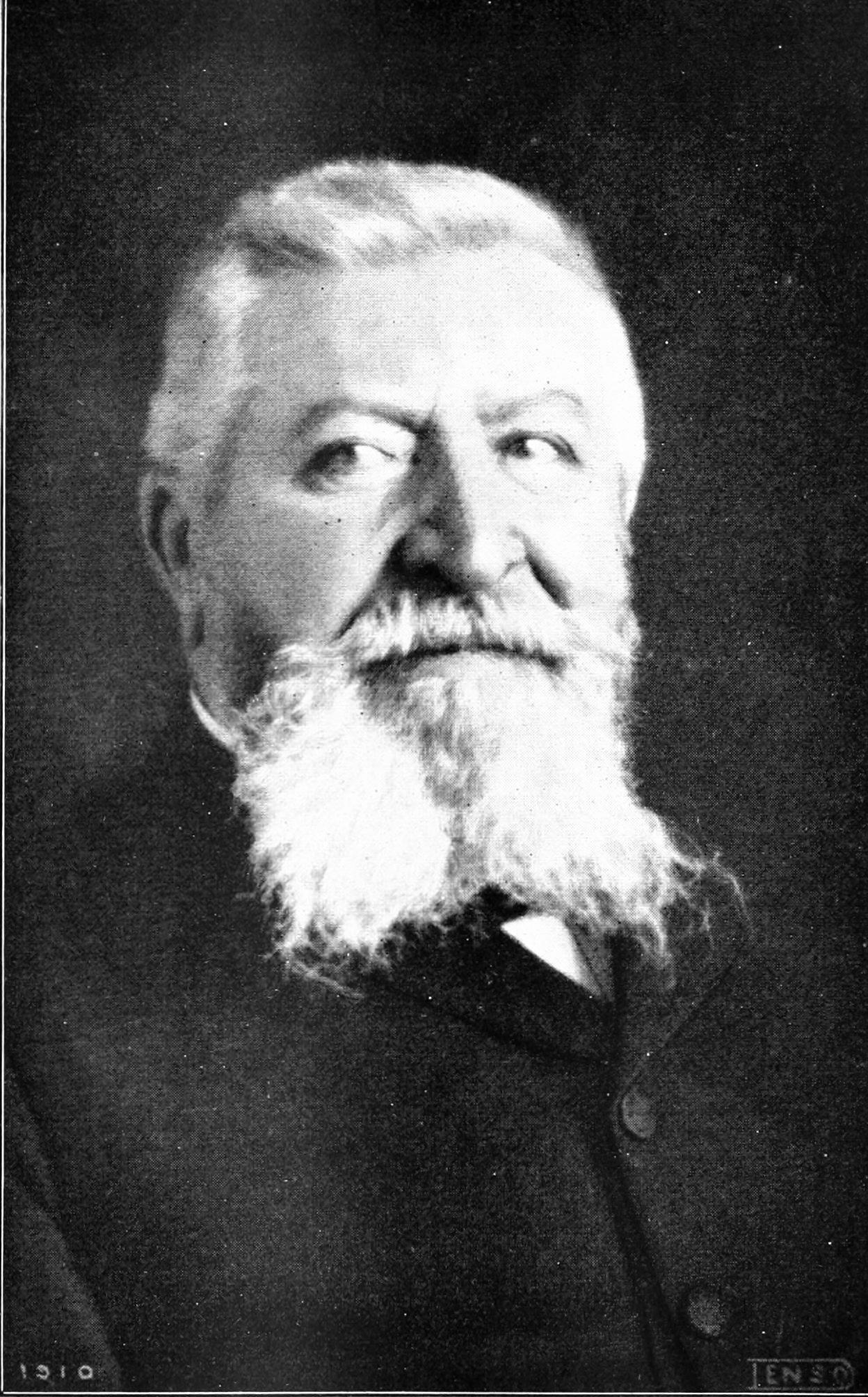
- Oberthür in 1910, aged 64/5
- Born: 14 September 1845; Rennes, France
- Died: 1 June 1924 (aged 78); Rennes, France
- Spouse: Louise Le Ray (m. 1870)
- Children: Joseph Marie Oberthür; Charles Oberthür; Gustave Adolphe Oberthür
- Scientific career
- Fields: Entomology
- Workplaces: Société des sciences naturelles de l'Ouest de la France; Société entomologique de France; Société linnéenne de Lyon

Charles Oberthür (French pronunciation: [ʃaʁl obɛʁtyʁ]; 14 September 1845 – 1 June 1924) was a French amateur entomologist specializing in lepidoptera.

== Biography ==
Charles Oberthür was born in Rennes, the son of the printer François-Charles Oberthür and Marie Hamelin, and brother of the entomologist René Oberthür. At the age of sixteen he entered the family printing house (which was responsible in particular for printing postal calendars and national lottery tickets) and quickly became a good lithographer. In 1870, he married Louise Le Ray. He is buried in the Cimetière du Nord in a chapel built by his brother-in-law Emmanuel Le Ray, a municipal architect.

=== Politics ===
Oberthür was for some time a member of the municipal council of Rennes. Between 1900 and 1906, he served as first deputy to the mayor, Eugène Pinault. In 1906, he ran as deputy for Ille-et-Vilaine against René Le Hérissé and Mr. Jaouen in the first constituency of the Arrondissement of Rennes. He scored well in the first round (8,151 votes out of 18,380) but was beaten in the second round on 20 May 1906 (2,172 votes out of 12,014).

== Entomology ==
Oberthür developed a passion for insects very early on, in particular thanks to the influence of his father. He began his first collection of insects at nine years old, and went on to acquire the collections of Jean Baptiste Boisduval (1799–1879), Achille Guenée (1809–1880), Jean-Baptiste Eugène Bellier de la Chavignerie (1819–1888), Adolphe de Graslin (1802–1882), Constant Bar (1817–1884), Emmanuel Martin (1827– 1897), Antoine Barthélemy Jean Guillemot and Henry Walter Bates (1825–1892). This immense collection, at the end of his life, contained five million specimens in 15,000 glass topped boxes of 50 x 39 cm. In 1916, it was the second largest private collection in the world.

Upon Oberthür's death, his brother René received 55,000 skipper butterflies from the collection, which he later sold to the British Natural History Museum in 1931. The rest of the butterfly collection was sold in 1925. Specimens (mostly North American species) were acquired by William Barnes, and subsequently acquired by the National Museum of Natural History in 1930 upon Barnes' death. Swallowtail butterflies were acquired by David Longsdon, whose large swallowtail collection was bequeathed to the Manchester Museum in 1938 upon Longsdon's death. Other specimens were likely acquired by a number of other entomologists.

=== Taxonomy ===
Oberthür named forty-five new genera of insects, forty-two of them moths. A large number were species from North Africa and Asia. In 1913, he received the Cuvier prize from the Academy of Sciences.

== Select publications ==
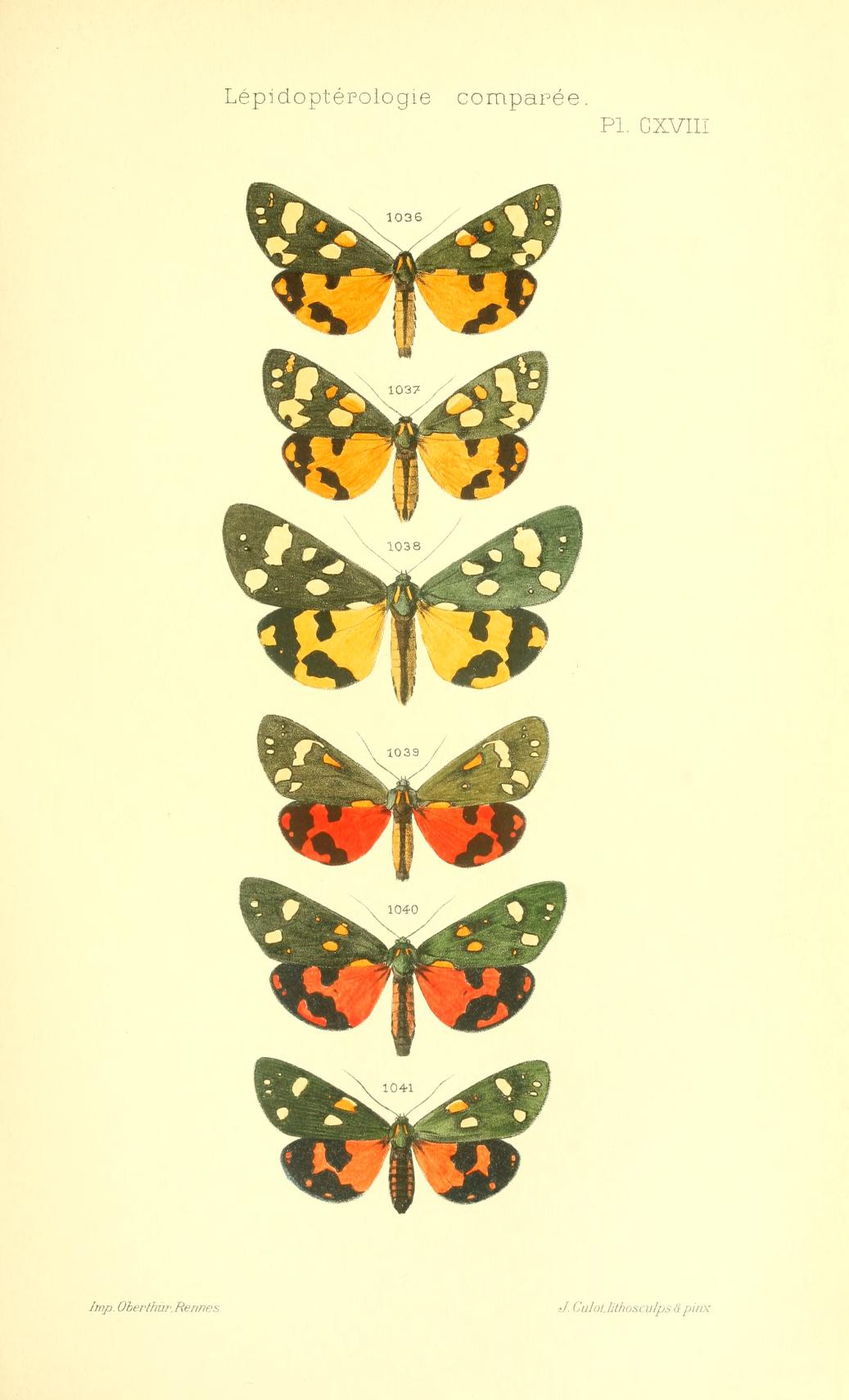
Plate from Etudes d'Entomologie Fascicle VI (1912)

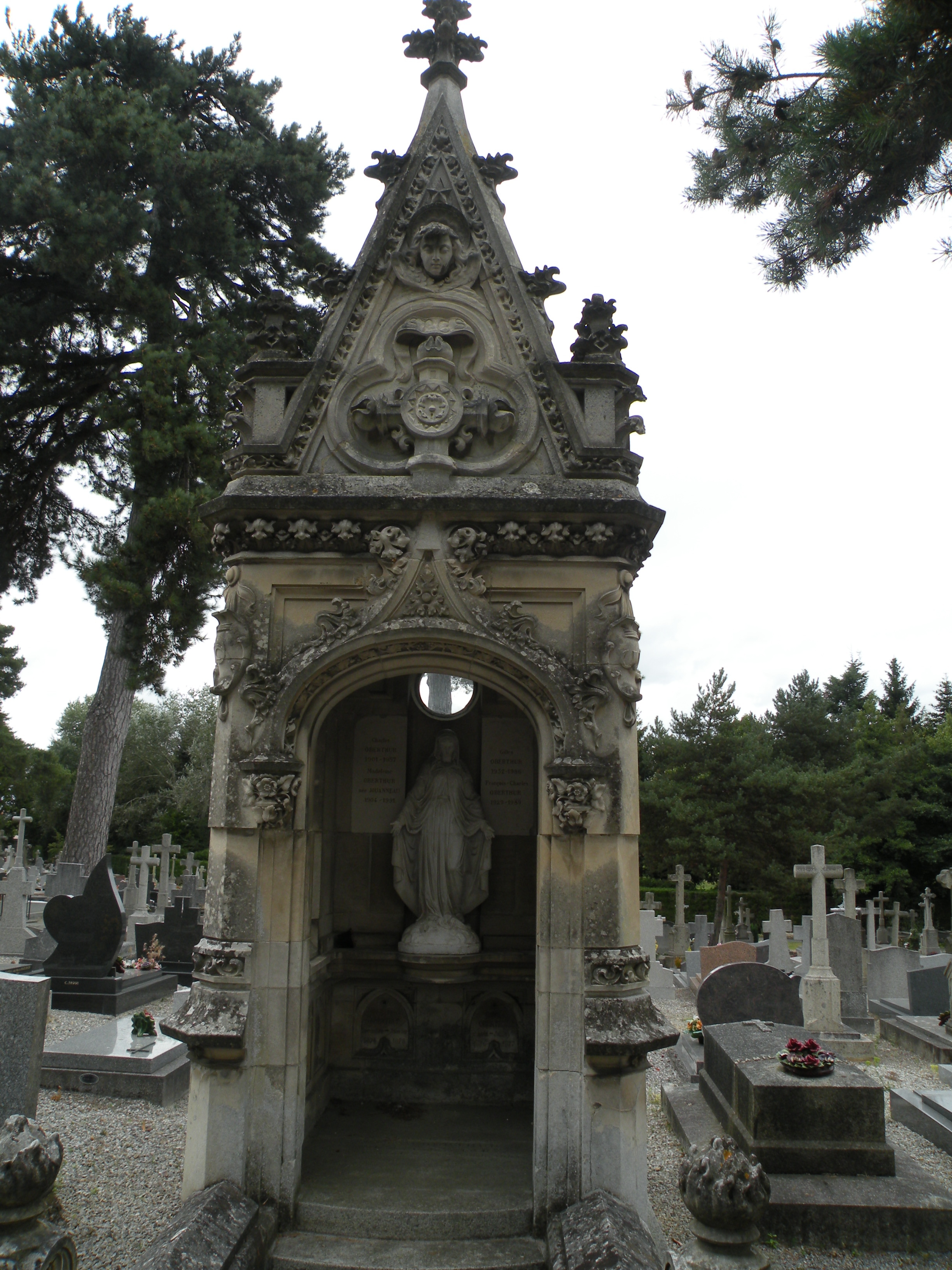
Oberthür's tomb in the Cimetière du Nord, Rennes

- 1879 Catalogue raisonné des Papilionidae de la Collection de Ch. Oberthür Etudes d'Entomologie, 4: 20–117.
- Études de lépidoptérologie comparée, impr. Oberthür, In-8° et in-4°, nombreuses planches
- Étude sur une collection de lépidoptères formée sur la côte de Malabar et à Ceylan par M. Émile Deschamps, 1889–1890, Paris, Société zoologique de France, 1892, In-8°, 16 p.
- Supplément du Bulletin de la Société scientifique et médicale de l'Ouest
- Faune des Lepidopteres de la Barbarie. Etudes de Lepidopterologie comparee, part 10, p. 1-459. Rennes, 1914. text online plates online.
- Faune entomologique armoricaine. Lépidoptères (premier fascicule). Rhopalocères, avec Constant Houlbert, impr. Oberthur, 1912. In-8°, 260 p. réimprimé en 1922.
- Considérations sur la faune lépidoptérologique d'Alsace et sur les travaux et les collections des entomologistes alsaciens depuis le XVIIIe siècle., impr. Oberthür, 1920, In-8°, 30 p.
- Considérations sur la première question dont l'examen est proposé au congrès international de zoologie de Paris (5–10 août 1889) : "Des Règles à adopter pour la nomenclature des êtres organisés, de l'adoption d'une langue scientifique internationale", impr. Oberthür, 1889, Gr. in-8°, 7 p.

== See also ==
- Walter Rothschild
