= List of birds of Europe =

More than 900 species of birds have been observed in Europe. The avifauna of Europe is broadly similar to that of Asia north of the Himalayas and North Africa, both of which also belong to the Palearctic realm. There are also many groups shared with North America. On the other hand, many groups characteristic of the Afrotropical and Indomalayan realms are entirely absent from Europe, including jacanas, darters, trogons, hornbills, honeyguides, barbets (families Lybiidae in Africa and Megalaimidae in Asia), parrots, pittas, cuckooshrikes, broadbills (families Calyptomenidae and Eurylaimidae), drongos, monarch flycatchers, white-eyes, and waxbills (although parrots and waxbills have been introduced to Europe by humans).

Three species that occurred in the European region until recently (post 1800), the great auk, the Canary Islands oystercatcher, and the slender-billed curlew, are now globally extinct, the last being concluded to be extinct in 2025. In addition, the common buttonquail has become extinct in Europe, but survives in Africa and Asia. In total, 71 bird species are considered threatened in Europe.

The following tags have been used to indicate the status of species in Europe. The commonly occurring native species do not fall into any of these categories.

- (A) Accidental - a species that rarely or accidentally occurs in Europe
- (E) Endemic - a species endemic to Europe
- (Ext) Extinct - a species that no longer exists
- (Ex) Regionally extinct - a species that is extinct in the wild in Europe
- (I) Introduced - a species introduced to Europe as a consequence, direct or indirect, of human actions

Records up to and including 2015 are based on Mitchell (2017). The taxonomic order follows the AviList version v2025.

== Definition of Europe ==
This article follows a common definition of Europe as being bounded to the south by the Mediterranean Sea, to the east and north-east by the Ural Mountains, the Ural River, and the Caspian Sea, and to the south-east by the Caucasus Mountains, the Black Sea, and the waterways connecting the Black Sea to the Mediterranean Sea. Iceland and Svalbard are included, but Greenland is not. Mediterranean islands are generally included, except for Cyprus and those islands belonging to Turkey or countries of North Africa or the Middle East. The Azores, Madeira and the Canary Islands belong politically to Europe, but definitions based on geography or avifauna assign these islands variously to Europe, Africa, or neither of the two. Here, birds that are endemic to these islands, or have been observed only on these islands but not elsewhere in Europe, are labelled accordingly. The same approach is applied to birds occurring only in the Caucasus, which is commonly seen as straddling the border between Europe and Asia. The birds of Cape Verde are not included in this list. Oceans are included up to the limit of 200 nautical miles from the European coastline, or half the distance to Africa or Asia, whichever is lesser.

For countries or territories lying wholly within Europe as defined above, species are included in this list if they are classified as Category A, B, or C (or the nearest equivalent) on the relevant national list. For countries that straddle Europe and Asia (in particular Russia and Turkey), the precise location of sightings within that country is determinative.

== Ducks, geese, and swans ==
Order: Anseriformes Family: Anatidae

The swans, ducks and geese are medium to large birds that are adapted to an aquatic existence with webbed feet and bills which are flattened to a greater or lesser extent. In many ducks the male is colourful while the female is dull brown. The diet consists of a variety of animals and plants. The family is well represented in Europe with many introduced species as well.

- Fulvous whistling duck, Dendrocygna bicolor (A-Azores)
- White-headed duck, Oxyura leucocephala
- Ruddy duck, Oxyura jamaicensis (I)
- Mute swan, Cygnus olor
- Black swan, Cygnus atratus (I)
- Tundra swan, Cygnus columbianus
- Whooper swan, Cygnus cygnus
- Brant goose, Branta bernicla
- Red-breasted goose, Branta ruficollis
- Canada goose, Branta canadensis (I, A)
- Barnacle goose, Branta leucopsis
- Cackling goose, Branta hutchinsii (A)
- Bar-headed goose, Anser indicus (I, A)
- Ross's goose, Anser rossii (A)
- Snow goose, Anser caerulescens (I, A)
- Greylag goose, Anser anser
- Lesser white-fronted goose, Anser erythropus
- Greater white-fronted goose, Anser albifrons
- Tundra bean goose, Anser serrirostris
- Pink-footed goose, Anser brachyrhynchus
- Taiga bean goose, Anser fabalis
- Egyptian goose, Alopochen aegyptiaca (I)
- Muscovy duck, Cairina moschata (I-Canary Islands)
- Mandarin duck, Aix galericulata (I)
- Wood duck, Aix sponsa (I, A)
- Common shelduck, Tadorna tadorna
- Ruddy shelduck, Tadorna ferruginea
- Long-tailed duck, Clangula hyemalis
- Steller's eider, Polysticta stelleri
- Spectacled eider, Somateria fischeri (A)
- King eider, Somateria spectabilis
- Common eider, Somateria mollissima
- Harlequin duck, Histrionicus histrionicus
- Common scoter, Melanitta nigra
- Black scoter, Melanitta americana (A)
- Surf scoter, Melanitta perspicillata (A)
- Velvet scoter, Melanitta fusca
- White-winged scoter, Melanitta deglandi (A)
- Stejneger's scoter, Melanitta stejnegeri (A)
- Bufflehead, Bucephala albeola (A)
- Barrow's goldeneye, Bucephala islandica
- Common goldeneye, Bucephala clangula
- Smew, Mergellus albellus
- Hooded merganser, Lophodytes cucullatus (A)
- Red-breasted merganser, Mergus serrator
- Common merganser, Mergus merganser
- Marbled duck, Marmaronetta angustirostris
- Red-crested pochard, Netta rufina
- Ferruginous duck, Aythya nyroca
- Common pochard, Aythya ferina
- Canvasback, Aythya valisineria (A)
- Redhead, Aythya americana (A)
- Ring-necked duck, Aythya collaris (A)
- Tufted duck, Aythya fuligula
- Lesser scaup, Aythya affinis (A)
- Greater scaup, Aythya marila
- Baikal teal, Sibirionetta formosa (A)
- Garganey, Spatula querquedula
- Blue-winged teal, Spatula discors (A)
- Cinnamon teal, Spatula cyanoptera (A)
- Northern shoveler, Spatula clypeata
- Falcated duck, Mareca falcata (A)
- Gadwall, Mareca strepera
- Eurasian wigeon, Mareca penelope
- American wigeon, Mareca americana (A)
- Mallard, Anas platyrhynchos
- American black duck, Anas rubripes (A)
- Northern pintail, Anas acuta
- Green-winged teal, Anas crecca

== Guineafowl ==
Order: Galliformes Family: Numididae

Guineafowl are a group of African, seed-eating, ground-nesting birds that resemble partridges, but with featherless heads and spangled grey plumage.

- Helmeted guineafowl, Numida meleagris (I)

== New World quail ==
Order: Galliformes Family: Odontophoridae

- Northern bobwhite, Colinus virginianus (I)
- California quail, Callipepla californica (I)

== Pheasants and allies ==
Order: Galliformes Family: Phasianidae

Pheasants and allies are terrestrial species, feeding and nesting on the ground. They are variable in size but generally plump, with broad and relatively short wings.

- Hazel grouse, Tetrastes bonasia
- Rock ptarmigan, Lagopus muta
- Red grouse, Lagopus scotica
- Willow ptarmigan, Lagopus lagopus
- Western capercaillie, Tetrao urogallus
- Cantabrian capercaillie, Tetrao urogallus cantabricus
- Caucasian grouse, Lyrurus mlokosiewiczi (E-Caucasus)
- Black grouse, Lyrurus tetrix
- Grey partridge, Perdix perdix
- Reeves's pheasant, Syrmaticus reevesii (I)
- Golden pheasant, Chrysolophus pictus (I)
- Lady Amherst's pheasant, Chrysolophus amherstiae (I)
- Common pheasant, Phasianus colchicus (I)
- Black francolin, Francolinus francolinus (Ex, formerly possibly I)
- Caucasian snowcock, Tetraogallus caucasicus (E-Caucasus)
- Common quail, Coturnix coturnix
- Barbary partridge, Alectoris barbara
- Red-legged partridge, Alectoris rufa (E)
- Chukar partridge, Alectoris chukar
- Rock partridge, Alectoris graeca (E)
- Erckel's spurfowl, Pternistis erckelii (I)

== Flamingos ==
Order: Phoenicopteriformes Family: Phoenicopteridae

Flamingos are gregarious wading birds, usually 1 to 1.5 metres (3.3 to 4.9 ft) tall, found in both the Western and Eastern Hemispheres. Flamingos filter-feed on shellfish and algae. Their oddly shaped beaks are specially adapted to separate mud and silt from the food they consume and, uniquely, are used upside-down.

- Lesser flamingo, Phoenicopterus minor (A)
- Greater flamingo, Phoenicopterus roseus

== Grebes ==
Order: Podicipediformes Family: Podicipedidae

Grebes are small to medium-large diving birds with lobed toes and pointed bills. They are seen mainly on lowland waterbodies and coasts. They feed on aquatic animals and nest on a floating platform of vegetation.

- Little grebe, Tachybaptus ruficollis
- Pied-billed grebe, Podilymbus podiceps (A)
- Horned grebe, Podiceps auritus
- Red-necked grebe, Podiceps grisegena
- Great crested grebe, Podiceps cristatus
- Black-necked grebe, Podiceps nigricollis

== Bustards ==
Order: Otidiformes Family: Otididae

Bustards are large terrestrial birds mainly associated with dry open country and steppes in the Old World. They are omnivorous and nest on the ground. They walk steadily on strong legs and big toes, pecking for food as they go. They have long broad wings with "fingered" wingtips and striking patterns in flight. Many have interesting mating displays.

- Great bustard, Otis tarda
- Asian houbara, Chlamydotis macqueenii (A)
- African houbara, Chlamydotis undulata (Canary Islands)
- Little bustard, Tetrax tetrax

== Cuckoos ==
Order: Cuculiformes Family: Cuculidae

The family Cuculidae includes cuckoos, roadrunners and anis. These birds are of variable size with slender bodies, long tails and strong legs. The Old World cuckoos are brood parasites.

- Great spotted cuckoo, Clamator glandarius
- Yellow-billed cuckoo, Coccyzus americanus (A)
- Black-billed cuckoo, Coccyzus erythropthalmus (A)
- Common cuckoo, Cuculus canorus
- Oriental cuckoo, Cuculus optatus (A)

== Sandgrouse ==
Order: Pterocliformes Family: Pteroclidae

Sandgrouse have small, pigeon like heads and necks, but sturdy compact bodies. They have long pointed wings and sometimes tails and a fast direct flight. Flocks fly to watering holes at dawn and dusk. Their legs are feathered down to the toes.

- Pallas's sandgrouse, Syrrhaptes paradoxus (A)
- Pin-tailed sandgrouse, Pterocles alchata
- Chestnut-bellied sandgrouse, Pterocles exustus (A)
- Spotted sandgrouse, Pterocles senegallus (A)
- Black-bellied sandgrouse, Pterocles orientalis

== Pigeons and doves ==
Order: Columbiformes Family: Columbidae

Pigeons and doves are stout-bodied birds with short necks and short slender bills with a fleshy cere.

- Mourning dove, Zenaida macroura (A)
- Laughing dove, Spilopelia senegalensis
- Oriental turtle dove, Streptopelia orientalis (A)
- European turtle dove, Streptopelia turtur
- Eurasian collared dove, Streptopelia decaocto
- African collared dove, Streptopelia roseogrisea (I)
- Laurel pigeon, Columba junoniae (E-Canary Islands)
- Common wood pigeon, Columba palumbus
- Trocaz pigeon, Columba trocaz (E-Madeira)
- Bolle's pigeon, Columba bollii (E-Canary Islands)
- Rock dove, Columba livia
- Stock dove, Columba oenas

== Cranes ==
Order: Gruiformes Family: Gruidae

Cranes are large, long-legged and long-necked birds. Unlike the similar-looking but unrelated herons, cranes fly with necks outstretched, not pulled back. Most have elaborate and noisy courting displays or "dances".

- Siberian crane, Leucogeranus leucogeranus
- Sandhill crane, Antigone canadensis (A)
- Demoiselle crane, Grus virgo
- Common crane, Grus grus

== Rails, crakes, and coots ==
Order: Gruiformes Family: Rallidae

Rallidae is a family of small to medium-sized birds which includes the rails, crakes, coots and gallinules. Typically they inhabit dense vegetation in damp environments near lakes, swamps or rivers. In general they are shy and secretive birds, making them difficult to observe. Most species have strong legs and long toes which are well adapted to soft uneven surfaces. They tend to have short, rounded wings and to be weak fliers.

- Water rail, Rallus aquaticus
- African crake, Crecopsis egregia (A)
- Corn crake, Crex crex
- Sora, Porzana carolina (A)
- Spotted crake, Porzana porzana
- Lesser moorhen, Paragallinula angulata (A)
- Common moorhen, Gallinula chloropus
- Common gallinule, Gallinula galeata (A)
- Eurasian coot, Fulica atra
- Red-knobbed coot, Fulica cristata
- American coot, Fulica americana (A)
- Allen's gallinule, Porphyrio alleni (A)
- Purple gallinule, Porphyrio martinica (A)
- Purple swamphen, Porphyrio porphyrio
- Little crake, Zapornia parva
- Baillon's crake, Zapornia pusilla
- Striped crake, Aenigmatolimnas marginalis (A)

== Stone-curlews and thick-knees ==
Order: Charadriiformes Family: Burhinidae

The stone-curlews and thick-knees are a group of largely tropical waders in the family Burhinidae. They are found worldwide within the tropical zone, with some species also breeding in temperate Europe and Australia. They are medium to large waders with strong black or yellow-black bills, large yellow eyes and cryptic plumage. Despite being classed as waders, most species have a preference for arid or semi-arid habitats.

- Eurasian stone-curlew, Burhinus oedicnemus

== Egyptian plover ==
Order: Charadriiformes Family: Pluvianidae

The Egyptian plover is found across equatorial Africa and along the Nile River.

- Egyptian plover, Pluvianus aegyptius (A-Canary Islands)

== Stilts and avocets ==
Order: Charadriiformes Family: Recurvirostridae

A family of fairly large wading birds. The avocets have long legs and long up-curved bills. The stilts have extremely long legs and long, thin, straight bills.

- Pied avocet, Recurvirostra avosetta
- Black-winged stilt, Himantopus himantopus

== Oystercatchers ==
Order: Charadriiformes Family: Haematopodidae

The oystercatchers are large and noisy plover-like birds, with strong bills used for smashing or prising open molluscs.

- Canary Islands oystercatcher, Haematopus meadewaldoi (Ext-formerly endemic to the Canary Islands)
- Eurasian oystercatcher, Haematopus ostralegus

== Plovers ==
Order: Charadriiformes Family: Charadriidae

Small to medium-sized wading birds with compact bodies, short, thick necks and long, usually pointed, wings. They are found in open country worldwide, mostly in habitats near water.

- Grey plover, Pluvialis squatarola
- European golden plover, Pluvialis apricaria
- American golden plover, Pluvialis dominica (A)
- Pacific golden plover, Pluvialis fulva (A)
- Eurasian dotterel, Eudromias morinellus
- Killdeer, Charadrius vociferus (A)
- Semipalmated plover, Charadrius semipalmatus (Azores, elsewhere A)
- Common ringed plover, Charadrius hiaticula
- Little ringed plover, Thinornis dubius
- Northern lapwing, Vanellus vanellus
- Spur-winged lapwing, Vanellus spinosus
- Grey-headed lapwing, Vanellus cinereus (A)
- Sociable lapwing, Vanellus gregarius (A)
- White-tailed lapwing, Vanellus leucurus (A)
- Caspian plover, Anarhynchus asiaticus (A)
- Oriental plover, Anarhynchus veredus (A)
- Tibetan sand plover, Anarhynchus atrifrons (A)
- Siberian sand plover, Anarhynchus mongolus (A)
- Greater sand plover, Anarhynchus leschenaultii (A)
- Kittlitz's plover, Anarhynchus pecuarius (A)
- Kentish plover, Anarhynchus alexandrinus

== Sandpipers and snipes ==
Order: Charadriiformes Family: Scolopacidae

Scolopacidae is a large diverse family of small to medium-sized shorebirds including the sandpipers, curlews, godwits, shanks, tattlers, woodcocks, snipes, dowitchers and phalaropes. The majority of these species eat small invertebrates picked out of the mud or soil. Variation in length of legs and bills enables multiple species to feed in the same habitat, particularly on the coast, without direct competition for food.

- Upland sandpiper, Bartramia longicauda (A)
- Eskimo curlew, Numenius borealis (A, possibly Ext)
- Little curlew, Numenius minutus (A)
- Hudsonian whimbrel, Numenius hudsonicus (A)
- Eurasian whimbrel, Numenius phaeopus
- Slender-billed curlew, Numenius tenuirostris (Ext)
- Eurasian curlew, Numenius arquata
- Bar-tailed godwit, Limosa lapponica
- Black-tailed godwit, Limosa limosa
- Hudsonian godwit, Limosa haemastica (A)
- Long-billed dowitcher, Limnodromus scolopaceus (A)
- Short-billed dowitcher, Limnodromus griseus (A)
- Jack snipe, Lymnocryptes minimus
- American woodcock, Scolopax minor (A)
- Eurasian woodcock, Scolopax rusticola
- Swinhoe's snipe, Gallinago megala (A)
- Pin-tailed snipe, Gallinago stenura
- Great snipe, Gallinago media
- Wilson's snipe, Gallinago delicata (A)
- Common snipe, Gallinago gallinago
- Terek sandpiper, Xenus cinereus
- Common sandpiper, Actitis hypoleucos
- Spotted sandpiper, Actitis macularius (A)
- Wilson's phalarope, Phalaropus tricolor (A)
- Red phalarope, Phalaropus fulicarius
- Red-necked phalarope, Phalaropus lobatus
- Green sandpiper, Tringa ochropus
- Solitary sandpiper, Tringa solitaria (A)
- Grey-tailed tattler, Tringa brevipes (A)
- Marsh sandpiper, Tringa stagnatilis
- Wood sandpiper, Tringa glareola
- Common redshank, Tringa totanus
- Lesser yellowlegs, Tringa flavipes (A)
- Willet, Tringa semipalmata (A)
- Spotted redshank, Tringa erythropus
- Common greenshank, Tringa nebularia
- Greater yellowlegs, Tringa melanoleuca (A)
- Ruddy turnstone, Arenaria interpres
- Red knot, Calidris canutus
- Great knot, Calidris tenuirostris (A)
- Ruff, Calidris pugnax
- Sharp-tailed sandpiper, Calidris acuminata (A)
- Broad-billed sandpiper, Calidris falcinellus
- Curlew sandpiper, Calidris ferruginea
- Stilt sandpiper, Calidris himantopus (A)
- Red-necked stint, Calidris ruficollis (A)
- Temminck's stint, Calidris temminckii
- Long-toed stint, Calidris subminuta (A)
- Buff-breasted sandpiper, Calidris subruficollis (A)
- Sanderling, Calidris alba
- Dunlin, Calidris alpina
- Purple sandpiper, Calidris maritima
- Baird's sandpiper, Calidris bairdii (A)
- Pectoral sandpiper, Calidris melanotos (A)
- Semipalmated sandpiper, Calidris pusilla (A)
- Western sandpiper, Calidris mauri (A)
- Little stint, Calidris minuta
- Least sandpiper, Calidris minutilla (A)
- White-rumped sandpiper, Calidris fuscicollis (A)

== Buttonquail ==
Order: Charadriiformes Family: Turnicidae

The buttonquail are small, drab, running birds which resemble the true quails. The female is the brighter of the sexes and initiates courtship. The male incubates the eggs and tends the young.

- Common buttonquail, Turnix sylvaticus (Ex)

== Coursers and pratincoles ==
Order: Charadriiformes Family: Glareolidae

Glareolidae is a family of wading birds comprising the pratincoles, which have short legs, long pointed wings and long forked tails, and the coursers, which have long legs, short wings and long, pointed bills which curve downwards.

- Cream-coloured courser, Cursorius cursor (Canary Islands, elsewhere A)
- Oriental pratincole, Glareola maldivarum (A)
- Black-winged pratincole, Glareola nordmanni
- Collared pratincole, Glareola pratincola

== Skuas ==
Order: Charadriiformes Family: Stercorariidae

Skuas, also known as jaegers in North America, are in general medium to large seabirds, typically with grey or brown plumage, often with white markings on the wings. They nest on the ground in temperate and arctic regions and most are long-distance migrants.

- Arctic skua, Stercorarius parasiticus
- Long-tailed skua, Stercorarius longicaudus
- Pomarine skua, Stercorarius pomarinus
- Great skua, Stercorarius skua
- South polar skua, Stercorarius maccormicki (A)

== Auks ==
Order: Charadriiformes Family: Alcidae

Auks are superficially similar to penguins due to their black-and-white plumage, their upright posture and some of their habits, however they are not related to the penguins and differ in being able to fly. Auks live on the open sea, only deliberately coming ashore to nest.

- Tufted puffin, Fratercula cirrhata (A)
- Atlantic puffin, Fratercula arctica
- Horned puffin, Fratercula corniculata (A)
- Crested auklet, Aethia cristatella (A)
- Parakeet auklet, Aethia psittacula (A)
- Ancient murrelet, Synthliboramphus antiquus (A)
- Long-billed murrelet, Brachyramphus perdix (A)
- Black guillemot, Cepphus grylle
- Razorbill, Alca torda
- Great auk, Pinguinus impennis (Ext)
- Little auk, Alle alle
- Brünnich's guillemot, Uria lomvia
- Common guillemot, Uria aalge

== Gulls, terns, and skimmers ==
Order: Charadriiformes Family: Laridae

Laridae is a family of medium to large seabirds, the gulls, terns, and skimmers. They are typically grey or white, often with black markings on the head or wings. They have stout, longish bills and webbed feet. Terns are a group of generally medium to large seabirds typically with grey or white plumage, often with black markings on the head. Most terns hunt fish by diving but some pick insects off the surface of fresh water. Terns are generally long-lived birds, with several species known to live in excess of 30 years.

- Brown noddy, Anous stolidus (A)
- Aleutian tern, Onychoprion aleuticus (A)
- Sooty tern, Onychoprion fuscatus (A)
- Bridled tern, Onychoprion anaethetus (A)
- Little tern, Sternula albifrons
- Least tern, Sternula antillarum (A)
- Caspian tern, Hydroprogne caspia
- Gull-billed tern, Gelochelidon nilotica
- Whiskered tern, Chlidonias hybrida
- Black tern, Chlidonias niger
- White-winged tern, Chlidonias leucopterus
- Sandwich tern, Thalasseus sandvicensis
- Elegant tern, Thalasseus elegans (A)
- Royal tern, Thalasseus maximus (A)
- West African crested tern, Thalasseus albididorsalis (A)
- Lesser crested tern, Thalasseus bengalensis (A)
- Forster's tern, Sterna forsteri (A)
- Roseate tern, Sterna dougallii
- Arctic tern, Sterna paradisaea
- Common tern, Sterna hirundo
- Little gull, Hydrocoloeus minutus
- Ross's gull, Rhodostethia rosea (A)
- Black-legged kittiwake, Rissa tridactyla
- Sabine's gull, Xema sabini
- Ivory gull, Pagophila eburnea
- Slender-billed gull, Chroicocephalus genei
- Bonaparte's gull, Chroicocephalus philadelphia (A)
- Black-headed gull, Chroicocephalus ridibundus
- Grey-headed gull, Chroicocephalus cirrocephalus (A)
- Laughing gull, Leucophaeus atricilla (A)
- Franklin's gull, Leucophaeus pipixcan (A)
- Pallas's gull, Ichthyaetus ichthyaetus
- Relict gull, Ichthyaetus relictus (A)
- Audouin's gull, Ichthyaetus audouinii
- Mediterranean gull, Ichthyaetus melanocephalus
- White-eyed gull, Ichthyaetus leucophthalmus (A)
- Ring-billed gull, Larus delawarensis (A)
- Short-billed gull, Larus brachyrhynchus (A-Azores)
- Common gull, Larus canus
- Caspian gull, Larus cachinnans
- Kelp gull, Larus dominicanus (A)
- American herring gull, Larus smithsonianus (A)
- Vega gull, Larus vegae (A)
- European herring gull, Larus argentatus
- Yellow-legged gull, Larus michahellis
- Armenian gull, Larus armenicus
- Great black-backed gull, Larus marinus
- Glaucous gull, Larus hyperboreus
- Lesser black-backed gull, Larus fuscus
- Glaucous-winged gull, Larus glaucescens (A)
- Slaty-backed gull, Larus schistisagus (A)
- Iceland gull, Larus glaucoides

== Tropicbirds ==
Order: Phaethontiformes Family: Phaethontidae

Tropicbirds are a family of tropical pelagic seabirds. They are the sole living representatives of the order Phaethontiformes.

- Red-billed tropicbird, Phaethon aethereus (A)
- White-tailed tropicbird, Phaethon lepturus (A-Azores)

== Divers ==
Order: Gaviiformes Family: Gaviidae

Divers, known as loons in North America, are a group of aquatic birds found in many parts of northern Eurasia and North America. They are the size of a large duck or small goose, which they somewhat resemble when swimming, but to which they are completely unrelated.

- Red-throated diver, Gavia stellata
- Great northern diver, Gavia immer
- White-billed diver, Gavia adamsii
- Black-throated diver, Gavia arctica
- Pacific diver, Gavia pacifica (A)

== Albatrosses ==
Order: Procellariiformes Family: Diomedeidae

The albatrosses are among the largest flying birds, with long, narrow wings for gliding. The majority are found in the Southern Hemisphere with only vagrants occurring in the North Atlantic.

- Tristan albatross, Diomedea dabbenena (A)
- Atlantic yellow-nosed albatross, Thalassarche chlororhynchos (A)
- Black-browed albatross, Thalassarche melanophris (A)

== Austral storm petrels ==
Order: Procellariiformes Family: Oceanitidae

Austral storm petrels, or southern storm petrels, are seabirds in the family Oceanitidae, part of the order Procellariiformes. These smallest of seabirds feed on planktonic crustaceans and small fish picked from the surface, typically while hovering. Their flight is fluttering and sometimes bat-like.

- Wilson's storm petrel, Oceanites oceanicus
- White-faced storm petrel, Pelagodroma marina (Madeira and Canary Islands, elsewhere A)
- Black-bellied storm petrel, Fregetta tropica (A-Madeira and Canary Islands)

== Northern storm petrels ==
Order: Procellariiformes Family: Hydrobatidae

The northern storm petrels are the smallest seabirds, feeding on plankton and small fish picked from the surface, typically while hovering. They nest in colonies on the ground, most often in burrows.

- European storm petrel, Hydrobates pelagicus
- Band-rumped storm petrel, Hydrobates castro
- Monteiro's storm petrel, Hydrobates monteiroi (Azores)
- Swinhoe's storm petrel, Hydrobates monorhis (A)
- Leach's storm petrel, Hydrobates leucorhous

== Petrels and shearwaters ==
Order: Procellariiformes Family: Procellariidae

These are highly pelagic birds with long, narrow wings and tube-shaped nostrils. They feed at sea on fish, squid and other marine life. They come to land to breed in colonies, nesting in burrows or on cliffs.

- Cape petrel, Daption capense (A)
- Southern giant petrel, Macronectes giganteus (A)
- Northern fulmar, Fulmarus glacialis
- Bulwer's petrel, Bulweria bulwerii
- White-chinned petrel, Procellaria aequinoctialis (A)
- Cape Verde shearwater, Calonectris edwardsii (A-Canary Islands, Madeira)
- Scopoli's shearwater, Calonectris diomedea
- Cory's shearwater, Calonectris borealis
- Short-tailed shearwater, Ardenna tenuirostris (A)
- Sooty shearwater, Ardenna grisea
- Great shearwater, Ardenna gravis
- Manx shearwater, Puffinus puffinus
- Yelkouan shearwater, Puffinus yelkouan
- Sargasso shearwater, Puffinus lherminieri (A)
- Barolo shearwater, Puffinus baroli (Azores, Madeira and Canary Islands, elsewhere A)
- Boyd's shearwater, Puffinus boydi (A-Canary Islands)
- Soft-plumaged petrel, Pterodroma mollis (A)
- Black-capped petrel, Pterodroma hasitata (A)
- Bermuda petrel, Pterodroma cahow (A)
- Zino's petrel, Pterodroma madeira (Madeira)
- Fea's petrel, Pterodroma feae (A-Canary Islands)
- Desertas petrel, Pterodroma deserta (Madeira, elsewhere A)
- Barau's petrel, Pterodroma baraui (A–France)
- Trindade petrel, Pterodroma arminjoniana (A-Azores)

== Storks ==
Order: Ciconiiformes Family: Ciconiidae

Storks are large, long-legged, long-necked, wading birds with long, stout bills. Storks are mute, but bill-clattering is an important mode of communication at the nest. Their nests can be large and may be reused for many years. Many species are migratory.

- Yellow-billed stork, Mycteria ibis (A)
- Black stork, Ciconia nigra
- White stork, Ciconia ciconia

== Frigatebirds ==
Order: Suliformes Family: Fregatidae

Frigatebirds are found across all tropical and subtropical oceans. All have predominantly black plumage, long, deeply forked tails and long hooked bills. Females have white underbellies and males have a distinctive red gular pouch, which they inflate during the breeding season to attract females. Their wings are long and pointed and can span up to 2.3 metres (7.5 ft), the largest wing area to body weight ratio of any bird.

- Ascension frigatebird, Fregata aquila (A)
- Magnificent frigatebird, Fregata magnificens (A)

== Gannets and boobies ==
Order: Suliformes Family: Sulidae

The sulids comprise the gannets and boobies. Both groups are medium-large coastal seabirds that plunge-dive for fish.

- Northern gannet, Morus bassanus
- Cape gannet, Morus capensis (A-Azores)
- Red-footed booby, Sula sula (A)
- Brown booby, Sula leucogaster (A)
- Masked booby, Sula dactylatra (A)

== Cormorants and shags ==
Order: Suliformes Family: Phalacrocoracidae

Cormorants are medium to large coastal, fish-eating seabirds. Plumage colouration varies, with the majority having mainly dark plumage, some species being black-and-white and a few being colourful.

- Pygmy cormorant, Microcarbo pygmaeus
- European shag, Gulosus aristotelis
- Double-crested cormorant, Nannopterum auritum (A)
- Great cormorant, Phalacrocorax carbo

== Ibises and spoonbills ==
Order: Pelecaniformes Family: Threskiornithidae

A family of long-legged, long-necked wading birds. Ibises have long, curved bills. Spoonbills have a flattened bill, wider at the tip.

- Glossy ibis, Plegadis falcinellus
- Northern bald ibis, Geronticus eremita (reintroduced populations in Spain and Central Europe, otherwise A)
- Eurasian spoonbill, Platalea leucorodia
- African sacred ibis, Threskiornis aethiopicus (I)

== Pelicans ==
Order: Pelecaniformes Family: Pelecanidae

Pelicans are large water birds with a distinctive pouch under their beak.

- Dalmatian pelican, Pelecanus crispus
- Great white pelican, Pelecanus onocrotalus

== Herons and bitterns ==
Order: Pelecaniformes Family: Ardeidae

The family Ardeidae contains the bitterns, herons and egrets. Herons and egrets are medium to large wading birds with long necks and legs. Bitterns tend to be shorter necked and more wary. Members of Ardeidae fly with their necks retracted, unlike other long-necked birds such as storks, ibises and spoonbills.

- Least bittern, Botaurus exilis (A)
- Eurasian bittern, Botaurus stellaris
- American bittern, Botaurus lentiginosus (A)
- Von Schrenck's bittern, Botaurus eurhythmus (A)
- Dwarf bittern, Botaurus sturmii (A-Canary Islands)
- Little bittern, Botaurus minutus
- Little blue heron, Egretta caerulea (A)
- Tricolored heron, Egretta tricolor (A-Azores, Canary Islands)
- Black heron, Egretta ardesiaca (A)
- Snowy egret, Egretta thula (A)
- Western reef heron, Egretta gularis (A)
- Little egret, Egretta garzetta
- Yellow-crowned night heron, Nyctanassa violacea (A)
- Black-crowned night heron, Nycticorax nycticorax
- Little heron, Butorides atricapilla
- Green heron, Butorides virescens (A)
- Chinese pond heron, Ardeola bacchus (A)
- Squacco heron, Ardeola ralloides
- Great egret, Ardea alba
- Intermediate egret, Ardea intermedia (A)
- Western cattle egret, Ardea ibis
- Purple heron, Ardea purpurea
- Black-headed heron, Ardea melanocephala (A)
- Grey heron, Ardea cinerea
- Great blue heron, Ardea herodias (A)

== Nightjars ==
Order: Caprimulgiformes Family: Caprimulgidae

Nightjars are medium-sized nocturnal birds that usually nest on the ground. They have long wings, short legs and very short bills. Their soft plumage is cryptically coloured to resemble bark or leaves.

- Common nighthawk, Chordeiles minor (A)
- Red-necked nightjar, Caprimulgus ruficollis
- European nightjar, Caprimulgus europaeus
- Egyptian nightjar, Caprimulgus aegyptius (A)

== Swifts ==
Order: Apodiformes Family: Apodidae

Swifts are small birds which spend the majority of their lives flying. These birds have very short legs and never settle voluntarily on the ground, perching instead only on vertical surfaces.

- White-throated needletail, Hirundapus caudacutus (A)
- Chimney swift, Chaetura pelagica (A)
- Alpine swift, Tachymarptis melba
- Common swift, Apus apus
- Pallid swift, Apus pallidus
- Plain swift, Apus unicolor
- Pacific swift, Apus pacificus (A)
- Horus swift, Apus horus (A)
- Little swift, Apus affinis
- White-rumped swift, Apus caffer

== Barn owls ==
Order: Strigiformes Family: Tytonidae

Barn owls are medium-sized to large owls with large heads and characteristic heart-shaped faces. They have long strong legs with powerful talons.

- Western barn owl, Tyto alba

== Typical owls ==
Order: Strigiformes Family: Strigidae

Owls are a group of birds that belong to the order Strigiformes, constituting 200 extant bird of prey species. Most are solitary and nocturnal, with some exceptions (e.g., the northern hawk-owl). Owls hunt mostly small mammals, insects, and other birds, although a few species specialize in hunting fish.

- Boreal owl, Aegolius funereus
- Little owl, Athene noctua
- Northern hawk-owl, Surnia ulula
- Eurasian pygmy owl, Glaucidium passerinum
- Eurasian scops owl, Otus scops
- Marsh owl, Asio capensis (A)
- Short-eared owl, Asio flammeus
- Long-eared owl, Asio otus
- Snowy owl, Bubo scandiacus
- Eurasian eagle-owl, Bubo bubo
- Pharaoh eagle-owl, Bubo ascalaphus (A)
- Tawny owl, Strix aluco
- Ural owl, Strix uralensis
- Great grey owl, Strix nebulosa

== Osprey ==
Order: Accipitriformes Family: Pandionidae

The osprey is a large migratory fish-eating bird of prey. It is mainly brown above and white below with long, angled wings.

- Osprey, Pandion haliaetus

== Hawks, eagles, and kites ==
Order: Accipitriformes Family: Accipitridae

A family of birds of prey which includes hawks, buzzards, eagles, kites and harriers. These birds have very large powerful hooked beaks for tearing flesh from their prey, strong legs, powerful talons and keen eyesight.

- Black-winged kite, Elanus caeruleus
- Bearded vulture, Gypaetus barbatus
- Egyptian vulture, Neophron percnopterus
- European honey buzzard, Pernis apivorus
- Crested honey buzzard, Pernis ptilorhynchus (A)
- Swallow-tailed kite, Elanoides forficatus (A-Azores, Canary Islands)
- Cinereous vulture, Aegypius monachus
- Lappet-faced vulture, Torgos tracheliotos (A)
- Bateleur, Terathopius ecaudatus (A)
- Short-toed snake eagle, Circaetus gallicus
- White-backed vulture, Gyps africanus (A)
- Griffon vulture, Gyps fulvus
- Rüppell's vulture, Gyps rueppelli (A)
- Greater spotted eagle, Clanga clanga
- Lesser spotted eagle, Clanga pomarina
- Booted eagle, Hieraaetus pennatus
- Steppe eagle, Aquila nipalensis
- Eastern imperial eagle, Aquila heliaca
- Spanish imperial eagle, Aquila adalberti (E)
- Golden eagle, Aquila chrysaetos
- Bonelli's eagle, Aquila fasciata
- Levant sparrowhawk, Tachyspiza brevipes
- Eurasian sparrowhawk, Accipiter nisus
- American goshawk, Astur atricapillus
- Eurasian goshawk, Astur gentilis
- Pallid harrier, Circus macrourus
- Hen harrier, Circus cyaneus
- Northern harrier, Circus hudsonius (A)
- Montagu's harrier, Circus pygargus
- Western marsh harrier, Circus aeruginosus
- Red kite, Milvus milvus
- Black kite, Milvus migrans
- Pallas's fish eagle, Haliaeetus leucoryphus (A)
- Bald eagle, Haliaeetus leucocephalus (A)
- White-tailed eagle, Haliaeetus albicilla
- Long-legged buzzard, Buteo rufinus
- Common buzzard, Buteo buteo
- Rough-legged buzzard, Buteo lagopus

== Hoopoes ==
Order: Bucerotiformes Family: Upupidae

Distinctive birds with a long curved bill, a crest and black-and-white striped wings and tail.

- Eurasian hoopoe, Upupa epops

== Rollers ==
Order: Coraciiformes Family: Coraciidae

A small family of colourful, medium-sized birds with a crow-like shape that feed mainly on insects.

- Abyssinian roller, Coracias abyssinicus (A-Canary Islands)
- European roller, Coracias garrulus

== Bee-eaters ==
Order: Coraciiformes Family: Meropidae

A group of near-passerine birds characterised by richly coloured plumage, slender bodies and usually elongated central tail feathers.

- Asian green bee-eater, Merops orientalis (A)
- European bee-eater, Merops apiaster
- Blue-cheeked bee-eater, Merops persicus (A)

== Kingfishers ==
Order: Coraciiformes Family: Alcedinidae

Kingfishers are medium-sized birds with large heads, long, pointed bills, short legs and stubby tails.

- Common kingfisher, Alcedo atthis
- Belted kingfisher, Megaceryle alcyon (A)
- Pied kingfisher, Ceryle rudis (A)
- White-throated kingfisher, Halcyon smyrnensis (A)

== Woodpeckers ==
Order: Piciformes Family: Picidae

Woodpeckers are small to medium-sized birds with chisel-like beaks, short legs, stiff tails and long tongues used for capturing insects. Some species have feet with two toes pointing forward and two backward, while several species have only three toes. Many woodpeckers have the habit of tapping noisily on tree trunks with their beaks.

- Eurasian wryneck, Jynx torquilla
- Grey-headed woodpecker, Picus canus
- Iberian green woodpecker, Picus sharpei (E)
- European green woodpecker, Picus viridis
- Black woodpecker, Dryocopus martius
- Northern flicker, Colaptes auratus (A)
- Yellow-bellied sapsucker, Sphyrapicus varius (A)
- Eurasian three-toed woodpecker, Picoides tridactylus
- Middle spotted woodpecker, Dendrocoptes medius
- White-backed woodpecker, Dendrocopos leucotos
- Great spotted woodpecker, Dendrocopos major
- Syrian woodpecker, Dendrocopos syriacus
- Lesser spotted woodpecker, Dryobates minor

== Falcons and caracaras ==
Order: Falconiformes Family: Falconidae

Falconidae is a family of diurnal birds of prey. They differ from hawks, eagles and kites in that they kill with their beaks instead of their talons.

- Lesser kestrel, Falco naumanni
- Common kestrel, Falco tinnunculus
- American kestrel, Falco sparverius (A)
- Red-footed falcon, Falco vespertinus
- Amur falcon, Falco amurensis (A)
- Merlin, Falco columbarius
- Eleonora's falcon, Falco eleonorae
- Sooty falcon, Falco concolor (A)
- Eurasian hobby, Falco subbuteo
- Peregrine falcon, Falco peregrinus
- Lanner falcon, Falco biarmicus
- Saker falcon, Falco cherrug
- Gyrfalcon, Falco rusticolus

== African and New World parrots ==
Order: Psittaciformes Family: Psittacidae

At least three species have established themselves in Europe after being introduced by humans.

- Monk parakeet, Myiopsitta monachus (I)
- Mitred parakeet, Psittacara mitratus (I)
- Red-masked parakeet, Psittacara erythrogenys (I)

== Old World parrots ==
Order: Psittaciformes Family: Psittaculidae

At least two species have established themselves in Europe after being introduced by humans.

- Alexandrine parakeet, Psittacula eupatria (I)
- Rose-ringed parakeet, Psittacula krameri (I)

== Tyrant flycatchers ==
Order: Passeriformes Family: Tyrannidae

A family from the Americas with very rare vagrants recorded in Western Europe.

- Great crested flycatcher, Myiarchus crinitus (A-Azores)
- Eastern kingbird, Tyrannus tyrannus (A)
- Western kingbird, Tyrannus verticalis (A-Azores)
- Eastern phoebe, Sayornis phoebe (A)
- Eastern wood pewee, Contopus virens (A-Azores)
- Acadian flycatcher, Empidonax virescens (A)
- Alder flycatcher, Empidonax alnorum (A)
- Yellow-bellied flycatcher, Empidonax flaviventris (A)
- Least flycatcher, Empidonax minimus (A)

== Bushshrikes ==
Order: Passeriformes Family: Malaconotidae

Bushshrikes occur almost exclusively in Africa. They are similar in build and habits to shrikes, hunting insects and other small prey from a perch on a bush.

- Black-crowned tchagra, Tchagra senegalus (A)

== Vireos, greenlets, and shrike-babblers ==
Order: Passeriformes Family: Vireonidae

The vireos are a group of small to medium-sized passerine birds restricted to the New World and Southeast Asia.

- Warbling vireo, Vireo gilvus (A-Azores)
- Philadelphia vireo, Vireo philadelphicus (A)
- Red-eyed vireo, Vireo olivaceus (A)
- Yellow-throated vireo, Vireo flavifrons (A)
- White-eyed vireo, Vireo griseus (A-Azores)

== Figbirds and orioles ==
Order: Passeriformes Family: Oriolidae

The figbirds and orioles are medium-sized passerines, mostly with bright and showy plumage. The females often have duller plumage than the males. The beak is long, slightly curved and hooked. Orioles are arboreal and tend to feed in the canopy.

- Eurasian golden oriole, Oriolus oriolus

== Shrikes ==
Order: Passeriformes Family: Laniidae

Shrikes are passerine birds known for their habit of catching other birds and small animals and impaling the uneaten portions of their bodies on thorns. A typical shrike's beak is hooked, like a bird of prey.

- Great grey shrike, Lanius excubitor
- Iberian grey shrike, Lanius meridionalis (E)
- Northern shrike, Lanius borealis (A)
- Masked shrike, Lanius nubicus
- Lesser grey shrike, Lanius minor
- Woodchat shrike, Lanius senator
- Isabelline shrike, Lanius isabellinus (A)
- Red-backed shrike, Lanius collurio
- Red-tailed shrike, Lanius phoenicuroides (A)
- Long-tailed shrike, Lanius schach (A)
- Brown shrike, Lanius cristatus (A)

== Crows and jays ==
Order: Passeriformes Family: Corvidae

The family Corvidae includes crows, ravens, jays, choughs, magpies, treepies, nutcrackers and ground jays. Corvids are above average in size among the Passeriformes, and some of the larger species show high levels of intelligence.

- Alpine chough, Pyrrhocorax graculus
- Red-billed chough, Pyrrhocorax pyrrhocorax
- Iberian magpie, Cyanopica cooki (E)
- Siberian jay, Perisoreus infaustus
- Eurasian jay, Garrulus glandarius
- Eurasian magpie, Pica pica
- Northern nutcracker, Nucifraga caryocatactes
- Daurian jackdaw, Coloeus dauuricus (A)
- Western jackdaw, Coloeus monedula
- Rook, Corvus frugilegus
- Northern raven, Corvus corax
- Carrion crow, Corvus corone

== Penduline tits ==
Order: Passeriformes Family: Remizidae

The penduline tits are a group of small passerine birds related to the true tits. They are insectivores.

- Black-headed penduline tit, Remiz macronyx
- Eurasian penduline tit, Remiz pendulinus

== Tits and chickadees ==
Order: Passeriformes Family: Paridae

The Paridae are mainly small stocky woodland species with short stout bills. Some have crests. They are adaptable birds, with a mixed diet including seeds and insects.

- African blue tit, Cyanistes teneriffae (Canary Islands, elsewhere A)
- Azure tit, Cyanistes cyanus
- Eurasian blue tit, Cyanistes caeruleus
- Great tit, Parus major
- Coal tit, Periparus ater
- Crested tit, Lophophanes cristatus
- Sombre tit, Poecile lugubris
- Marsh tit, Poecile palustris
- Willow tit, Poecile montanus
- Grey-headed chickadee, Poecile cinctus

== Bearded reedling ==
Order: Passeriformes Family: Panuridae

A single species formerly placed in the Old World babbler family.

- Bearded reedling, Panurus biarmicus

== Larks ==
Order: Passeriformes Family: Alaudidae

Larks are small terrestrial birds with often extravagant songs and display flights. Most larks are fairly dull in appearance. Their food is insects and seeds.

- Greater hoopoe-lark, Alaemon alaudipes (A)
- Bar-tailed lark, Ammomanes cinctura (A)
- Woodlark, Lullula arborea
- White-winged lark, Alauda leucoptera
- Oriental skylark, Alauda gulgula (A-Caucasus)
- Eurasian skylark, Alauda arvensis
- Crested lark, Galerida cristata
- Thekla's lark, Galerida theklae
- Temminck's lark, Eremophila bilopha (A)
- Horned lark, Eremophila alpestris
- Greater short-toed lark, Calandrella brachydactyla
- Bimaculated lark, Melanocorypha bimaculata (A)
- Black lark, Melanocorypha yeltoniensis
- Calandra lark, Melanocorypha calandra
- Dupont's lark, Chersophilus duponti
- Mediterranean short-toed lark, Alaudala rufescens
- Turkestan short-toed lark, Alaudala heinei

== Cisticolas and allies ==
Order: Passeriformes Family: Cisticolidae

Cisticolas are generally very small birds of drab brown or grey appearance found in open country such as grassland or scrub. They are often difficult to see and many species are similar in appearance, so the song is often the best identification guide. These are insectivorous birds which nest low in vegetation.

- Zitting cisticola, Cisticola juncidis

== Reed warblers, Grauer's warbler, and allies ==
Order: Passeriformes Family: Acrocephalidae

The species in this family are usually rather large warblers. Most are rather plain olivaceous brown above with much yellow to beige below. They are usually found in open woodland, reedbeds, or tall grass. The family occurs mostly in southern to western Eurasia and surroundings, but also ranges far into the Pacific, with some species in Africa.

- Icterine warbler, Hippolais icterina
- Melodious warbler, Hippolais polyglotta
- Upcher's warbler, Hippolais languida (A)
- Olive-tree warbler, Hippolais olivetorum
- Thick-billed warbler, Arundinax aedon (A)
- Booted warbler, Iduna caligata
- Sykes's warbler, Iduna rama
- Eastern olivaceous warbler, Iduna pallida
- Western olivaceous warbler, Iduna opaca
- Sedge warbler, Acrocephalus schoenobaenus
- Aquatic warbler, Acrocephalus paludicola
- Moustached warbler, Acrocephalus melanopogon
- Paddyfield warbler, Acrocephalus agricola
- Blyth's reed warbler, Acrocephalus dumetorum
- Marsh warbler, Acrocephalus palustris
- Common reed warbler, Acrocephalus scirpaceus
- Great reed warbler, Acrocephalus arundinaceus

== Grassbirds and allies ==
Order: Passeriformes Family: Locustellidae

Grassbirds are small insectivorous songbirds, with tails that are usually long and pointed. These birds occur mainly in Eurasia, Africa, and the Australian region. They are less wren-like than the typical shrub-warblers (Cettia) but like these drab brownish or buffy all over. Many have bold dark streaks on wings and/or underside. Most live in scrubland and frequently hunt food by clambering through thick tangled growth or pursuing it on the ground; they are perhaps the most terrestrial of the "warblers".

- Gray's grasshopper warbler, Helopsaltes fasciolata (A)
- Pallas's grasshopper warbler, Helopsaltes certhiola (A)
- Lanceolated warbler, Locustella lanceolata (A)
- River warbler, Locustella fluviatilis
- Savi's warbler, Locustella luscinioides
- Common grasshopper warbler, Locustella naevia

== Swallows and martins ==
Order: Passeriformes Family: Hirundinidae

The family Hirundinidae is adapted to aerial feeding. They have a slender streamlined body, long pointed wings and a short bill with a wide gape. The feet are adapted to perching rather than walking, and the front toes are partially joined at the base.

- Sand martin, Riparia riparia
- Brown-throated martin, Riparia paludicola (A)
- Tree swallow, Tachycineta bicolor (A)
- Purple martin, Progne subis (A)
- Eurasian crag martin, Ptyonoprogne rupestris
- Pale rock martin, Ptyonoprogne obsoleta (A)
- Barn swallow, Hirundo rustica
- Common house martin, Delichon urbicum
- Asian house martin, Delichon dasypus (A)
- Red-breasted swallow, Cecropis semirufa (A)
- European red-rumped swallow, Cecropis rufula
- Eastern red-rumped swallow, Cecropis daurica (A)
- American cliff swallow, Petrochelidon pyrrhonota (A)

== Bushtits ==
Order: Passeriformes Family: Aegithalidae

Bushtits are a group of small passerine birds with medium to long tails. They make woven bag nests in trees. Most eat a mixed diet which includes insects.

- Long-tailed tit, Aegithalos caudatus

== Cettia bush warblers and allies ==
Order: Passeriformes Family: Cettiidae

Cettiidae is a family of small insectivorous songbirds. It contains the typical bush warblers (Cettia) and their relatives. Its members occur mainly in Asia and Africa, ranging into Oceania and Europe.

- Cetti's warbler, Cettia cetti

== Leaf warblers and allies ==
Order: Passeriformes Family: Phylloscopidae

Leaf warblers are small, active, insectivorous passerine birds. They glean the foliage for insects along the branches of trees and bushes. They forage at various levels within forests, from the top canopy to the understorey. Most of the species are markedly territorial both in their summer and winter quarters. Most are greenish or brownish above and off-white or yellowish below.

- Wood warbler, Phylloscopus sibilatrix
- Western Bonelli's warbler, Phylloscopus bonelli
- Eastern Bonelli's warbler, Phylloscopus orientalis
- Yellow-browed warbler, Phylloscopus inornatus
- Hume's leaf warbler, Phylloscopus humei (A)
- Pallas's leaf warbler, Phylloscopus proregulus
- Radde's warbler, Phylloscopus schwarzi (A)
- Sulphur-bellied warbler, Phylloscopus griseolus (A)
- Dusky warbler, Phylloscopus fuscatus (A)
- Plain leaf warbler, Phylloscopus neglectus (A)
- Willow warbler, Phylloscopus trochilus
- Mountain chiffchaff, Phylloscopus sindianus (Caucasus)
- Canary Islands chiffchaff, Phylloscopus canariensis (E-Canary Islands)
- Iberian chiffchaff, Phylloscopus ibericus
- Common chiffchaff, Phylloscopus collybita
- Eastern crowned warbler, Phylloscopus coronatus (A)
- Green warbler, Phylloscopus nitidus (A)
- Two-barred warbler, Phyloscopus plumbeitarsus (A)
- Greenish warbler, Phylloscopus trochiloides
- Pale-legged leaf warbler, Phylloscopus tenellipes (A)
- Arctic warbler, Phylloscopus borealis
- Kamchatka leaf warbler, Phylloscopus examinandus (A)

== Bulbuls ==
Order: Passeriformes Family: Pycnonotidae

Bulbuls are medium-sized songbirds. Some are colourful with yellow, red or orange vents, cheeks, throats or supercilia, but most are drab, with uniform olive-brown to black plumage. Some species have distinct crests.

- Red-whiskered bulbul, Pycnonotus jocosus (I)
- White-eared bulbul, Pycnonotus leucotis (possibly I)
- Common bulbul, Pycnonotus barbatus

== Sylviid babblers ==
Order: Passeriformes Family: Sylviidae

The sylviid warblers are a group of small insectivorous passerine birds. They mainly occur as breeding species, as the common name implies, in Europe, Asia and, to a lesser extent, Africa. Most are of generally undistinguished appearance, but many have distinctive songs.

- Garden warbler, Sylvia borin
- Eurasian blackcap, Sylvia atricapilla
- Barred warbler, Curruca nisoria
- Lesser whitethroat, Curruca curruca
- Western Orphean warbler, Curruca hortensis
- Eastern Orphean warbler, Curruca crassirostris
- Asian desert warbler, Curruca nana (A)
- African desert warbler, Curruca deserti (A)
- Tristram's warbler, Curruca deserticola (A)
- Menetries's warbler, Curruca mystacea (A)
- Common whitethroat, Curruca communis
- Spectacled warbler, Curruca conspicillata
- Marmora's warbler, Curruca sarda
- Balearic warbler, Curruca balearica (E)
- Dartford warbler, Curruca undata
- Rüppell's warbler, Curruca ruppeli
- Sardinian warbler, Curruca melanocephala
- Moltoni's warbler, Curruca subalpina
- Western subalpine warbler, Curruca iberiae
- Eastern subalpine warbler, Curruca cantillans

== Parrotbills and allies ==
Order: Passeriformes Family: Paradoxornithidae

Parrotbills and their allies are small, long-tailed birds that typically inhabit reedbeds and similar habitats. Most are native to East or Southeast Asia, although a single species, the wrentit, is native to North America. Introduced populations in Italy are thought to contain two parrotbill species, although there is some uncertainty about the taxonomic identity of these populations.

- Ashy-throated parrotbill, Suthora alphonsiana (I)
- Vinous-throated parrotbill, Suthora webbiana (I)

== Laughingthrushes and allies ==
Order: Passeriformes Family: Leiothrichidae

The laughingthrushes are a family of Old World passerine birds. They are diverse in size and coloration. These are birds of tropical areas, with the greatest variety in Southeast Asia and the Indian subcontinent.

- Red-billed leiothrix, Leiothrix lutea (I)

== Waxwings ==
Order: Passeriformes Family: Bombycillidae

The waxwings are a group of birds with soft silky plumage and unique red tips to some of the wing feathers. In the Bohemian and cedar waxwings, these tips look like sealing wax and give the group its name. These are arboreal birds of northern forests. They live on insects in summer and berries in winter.

- Cedar waxwing, Bombycilla cedrorum (A)
- Bohemian waxwing, Bombycilla garrulus

== Goldcrests and kinglets ==
Order: Passeriformes Family: Regulidae

The kinglets and "crests" are a small family of birds which resemble some warblers. They are very small insectivorous birds in the single genus Regulus. The adults have coloured crowns, giving rise to their name.

- Ruby-crowned kinglet, Corthylio calendula (A)
- Madeira firecrest, Regulus madeirensis (E-Madeira)
- Common firecrest, Regulus ignicapilla
- Goldcrest, Regulus regulus

== Wallcreeper ==
Order: Passeriformes Family: Tichodromidae

The wallcreeper is a small bird related to the nuthatch family, which has stunning crimson, grey and black plumage.

- Wallcreeper, Tichodroma muraria

== Nuthatches ==
Order: Passeriformes Family: Sittidae

Nuthatches are small woodland birds. They have the unusual ability to climb down trees head first, unlike other birds which can only go upwards. Nuthatches have big heads, short tails and powerful bills and feet.

- Krüper's nuthatch, Sitta krueperi
- Red-breasted nuthatch, Sitta canadensis (A)
- Corsican nuthatch, Sitta whiteheadi (E)
- Western rock nuthatch, Sitta neumayer
- Eastern rock nuthatch, Sitta tephronota (A-Caucasus)
- Eurasian nuthatch, Sitta europaea

== Treecreepers ==
Order: Passeriformes Family: Certhiidae

Treecreepers are small woodland birds, brown above and white below. They have thin pointed down-curved bills, which they use to extricate insects from bark. They have stiff tail feathers, like woodpeckers, which they use to support themselves on vertical trees.

- Eurasian treecreeper, Certhia familiaris
- Short-toed treecreeper, Certhia brachydactyla

== Wrens ==
Order: Passeriformes Family: Troglodytidae

The wrens are mainly small and inconspicuous except for their loud songs. These birds have short wings and thin down-turned bills. Several species often hold their tails upright. All are insectivorous.

- Eurasian wren, Troglodytes troglodytes

== Mockingbirds and thrashers ==
Order: Passeriformes Family: Mimidae

Medium-sized passerine birds with long tails. Some are notable for their ability to mimic sounds such as other birds' songs.

- Grey catbird, Dumetella carolinensis (A)
- Brown thrasher, Toxostoma rufum (A)
- Northern mockingbird, Mimus polyglottos (A)

== Starlings and rhabdornis ==
Order: Passeriformes Family: Sturnidae

Starlings are small to medium-sized passerine birds. Their flight is strong and direct and they are very gregarious. Their preferred habitat is fairly open country. They eat insects and fruit. Plumage is typically dark with a metallic sheen.

- Spotless starling, Sturnus unicolor
- Common starling, Sturnus vulgaris
- Rosy starling, Pastor roseus
- Daurian starling, Agropsar sturninus (A)
- Crested myna, Acridotheres cristatellus (I)

== Dippers ==
Order: Passeriformes Family: Cinclidae

Dippers are a group of perching birds whose habitat includes aquatic environments in the Americas, Europe and Asia. They are named for their bobbing or dipping movements.

- White-throated dipper, Cinclus cinclus

== Thrushes ==
Order: Passeriformes Family: Turdidae

The thrushes are a group of passerine birds that occur mainly in the Old World. They are plump, soft plumaged, small to medium-sized insectivores or sometimes omnivores, often feeding on the ground. Many have attractive songs.

- White's thrush, Zoothera aurea (A)
- Varied thrush, Ixoreus naevius (A)
- Wood thrush, Hylocichla mustelina (A)
- Swainson's thrush, Catharus ustulatus (A)
- Veery, Catharus fuscescens (A)
- Grey-cheeked thrush, Catharus minimus (A)
- Hermit thrush, Catharus guttatus (A)
- Siberian thrush, Geokichla sibirica (A)
- Mistle thrush, Turdus viscivorus
- Song thrush, Turdus philomelos
- Redwing, Turdus iliacus
- Common blackbird, Turdus merula
- Fieldfare, Turdus pilaris
- Ring ouzel, Turdus torquatus
- Red-throated thrush, Turdus ruficollis (A)
- Black-throated thrush, Turdus atrogularis
- Naumann's thrush, Turdus naumanni (A)
- Dusky thrush, Turdus eunomus (A)
- Tickell's thrush, Turdus unicolor (A)
- Eyebrowed thrush, Turdus obscurus (A)
- American robin, Turdus migratorius (A)

== Chats and Old World flycatchers ==
Order: Passeriformes Family: Muscicapidae

Old World flycatchers are a large group of small passerine birds native to the Old World. They are mainly small arboreal insectivores. The appearance of these birds is highly varied, but they mostly have weak songs and harsh calls.

- Rufous-tailed scrub robin, Cercotrichas galactotes
- Dark-sided flycatcher, Muscicapa sibirica (A)
- Asian brown flycatcher, Muscicapa dauurica (A)
- Spotted flycatcher, Muscicapa striata
- European robin, Erithacus rubecula
- White-throated robin, Irania gutturalis
- Thrush nightingale, Luscinia luscinia
- Common nightingale, Luscinia megarhynchos
- Bluethroat, Luscinia svecica
- Siberian rubythroat, Calliope calliope (A)
- Siberian blue robin, Larvivora cyane (A)
- Rufous-tailed robin, Larvivora sibilans (A)
- Red-breasted flycatcher, Ficedula parva
- Taiga flycatcher, Ficedula albicilla (A)
- Atlas pied flycatcher, Ficedula speculigera (A)
- Semicollared flycatcher, Ficedula semitorquata
- Collared flycatcher, Ficedula albicollis
- European pied flycatcher, Ficedula hypoleuca
- Red-flanked bluetail, Tarsiger cyanurus
- Daurian redstart, Phoenicurus auroreus (A)
- Güldenstädt's redstart, Phoenicurus erythrogastrus (Caucasus)
- Black redstart, Phoenicurus ochruros
- Moussier's redstart, Phoenicurus moussieri (A)
- Common redstart, Phoenicurus phoenicurus
- Common rock thrush, Monticola saxatilis
- Blue rock thrush, Monticola solitarius
- Whinchat, Saxicola rubetra
- Pied bush chat, Saxicola caprata (A)
- Siberian stonechat, Saxicola maurus
- Canary Islands stonechat, Saxicola dacotiae (E)
- European stonechat, Saxicola rubicola
- Hooded wheatear, Oenanthe monacha (A)
- Desert wheatear, Oenanthe deserti (A)
- Western black-eared wheatear, Oenanthe hispanica
- Pied wheatear, Oenanthe pleschanka
- Eastern black-eared wheatear, Oenanthe melanoleuca
- Cyprus wheatear, Oenanthe cypriaca
- Northern wheatear, Oenanthe oenanthe
- Isabelline wheatear, Oenanthe isabellina
- Red-rumped wheatear, Oenanthe moesta (A)
- Finsch's wheatear, Oenanthe finschii (A)
- Kurdish wheatear, Oenanthe xanthoprymna (A)
- Black wheatear, Oenanthe leucura
- White-crowned wheatear, Oenanthe leucopyga (A)

== Weavers and widowbirds ==
Order: Passeriformes Family: Ploceidae

The weavers are small passerine birds related to the finches. They are seed-eating birds with rounded conical bills. The males of many species are brightly coloured, usually in red or yellow and black, some species show variation in colour only in the breeding season.

- Black-headed weaver, Ploceus melanocephalus (I)
- Yellow-crowned bishop, Euplectes afer (I)

== Indigobirds and whydahs ==
Order: Passeriformes Family: Viduidae

The indigobirds and whydahs are finch-like species native to Africa whose plumage is usually dominated by black or indigo. All are obligate brood parasites, which lay their eggs in the nests of estrildid finches. One introduced species has established a population in Portugal.

- Pin-tailed whydah, Vidua macroura (I)

== Waxbills, munias and allies ==
Order: Passeriformes Family: Estrildidae

The estrildid finches are small passerine birds of the Old World tropics and Australasia. They are gregarious and often colonial seed eaters with short thick but pointed bills. They are all similar in structure and habits, but have wide variation in plumage colours and patterns.

- Indian silverbill, Euodice malabarica (I)
- Scaly-breasted munia, Lonchura punctulata (I)
- Black-rumped waxbill, Estrilda troglodytes (I)
- Orange-cheeked waxbill, Estrilda melpoda (I)
- Common waxbill, Estrilda astrild (I)
- Red avadavat, Amandava amandava (I)

== Accentors ==
Order: Passeriformes Family: Prunellidae

The accentors are in the only bird family, Prunellidae, which is completely endemic to the Palearctic. They are small, fairly drab species superficially similar to sparrows.

- Alpine accentor, Prunella collaris
- Black-throated accentor, Prunella atrogularis (A)
- Radde's accentor, Prunella ocularis (A)
- Dunnock, Prunella modularis
- Siberian accentor, Prunella montanella (A)

== Old World sparrows and snowfinches ==
Order: Passeriformes Family: Passeridae

Sparrows are small passerine birds. In general, sparrows tend to be small, plump, brown or grey birds with short tails and short powerful beaks. Sparrows are seed-eaters and they also consume small insects.

- Rock sparrow, Petronia petronia
- White-winged snowfinch, Montifringilla nivalis
- Pale rockfinch, Carpospiza brachydactyla (A)
- Eurasian tree sparrow, Passer montanus
- Dead Sea sparrow, Passer moabiticus (A)
- Spanish sparrow, Passer hispaniolensis
- Italian sparrow, Passer italiae
- House sparrow, Passer domesticus

== Wagtails and pipits ==
Order: Passeriformes Family: Motacillidae

The Motacillidae are a family of small passerine birds with medium to long tails. They include the wagtails, longclaws and pipits. They are slender, ground feeding insectivores of open country.

- Grey wagtail, Motacilla cinerea
- Western yellow wagtail, Motacilla flava
- Citrine wagtail, Motacilla citreola
- Eastern yellow wagtail, Motacilla tschutschensis (A)
- White wagtail, Motacilla alba
- Blyth's pipit, Anthus godlewskii (A)
- Tawny pipit, Anthus campestris
- Berthelot's pipit, Anthus berthelotii (E-Madeira and Canary Islands)
- Long-billed pipit, Anthus similis (A)
- Richard's pipit, Anthus richardi (A)
- Pechora pipit, Anthus gustavi
- Tree pipit, Anthus trivialis
- Olive-backed pipit, Anthus hodgsoni
- Red-throated pipit, Anthus cervinus
- Siberian pipit, Anthus japonicus (A)
- American pipit, Anthus rubescens (A)
- Meadow pipit, Anthus pratensis
- European rock pipit, Anthus petrosus (E)
- Water pipit, Anthus spinoletta

== Finches and euphonias ==
Order: Passeriformes Family: Fringillidae

Finches are seed-eating passerine birds, that are small to moderately large and have a strong beak, usually conical and in some species very large. All have twelve tail feathers and nine primaries. These birds have a bouncing flight with alternating bouts of flapping and gliding on closed wings, and most sing well.

- Brambling, Fringilla montifringilla
- Gran Canaria blue chaffinch, Fringilla polatzeki (E-Canary Islands)
- Tenerife blue chaffinch, Fringilla teydea (E-Canary Islands)
- Eurasian chaffinch, Fringilla coelebs
- Azores chaffinch, Fringilla moreletti (E-Azores)
- Madeira chaffinch, Fringilla maderensis (E-Madeira)
- Canary Islands chaffinch, Fringilla canariensis (E-Canary Islands)
- Evening grosbeak, Hesperiphona vespertina (A)
- Hawfinch, Coccothraustes coccothraustes
- Common rosefinch, Carpodacus erythrinus
- Great rosefinch, Carpodacus rubicilla (Caucasus)
- Long-tailed rosefinch, Carpodacus sibiricus (A)
- Pallas's rosefinch, Carpodacus roseus (A)
- Pine grosbeak, Pinicola enucleator
- Azores bullfinch, Pyrrhula murina (E-Azores)
- Eurasian bullfinch, Pyrrhula pyrrhula
- Crimson-winged finch, Rhodopechys sanguineus (A-Caucasus)
- Mongolian finch, Bucanetes mongolicus (A)
- Trumpeter finch, Bucanetes githagineus
- European greenfinch, Chloris chloris
- Twite, Linaria flavirostris
- Common linnet, Linaria cannabina
- Redpoll, Acanthis flammea
- Two-barred crossbill, Loxia leucoptera
- Parrot crossbill, Loxia pytyopsittacus
- Scottish crossbill, Loxia scotica (E)
- Red crossbill, Loxia curvirostra
- Citril finch, Carduelis citrinella
- Corsican finch, Carduelis corsicana (E)
- European goldfinch, Carduelis carduelis
- Atlantic canary, Serinus canaria (E-Azores, Madeira and Canary Islands)
- European serin, Serinus serinus
- Red-fronted serin, Serinus pusillus (A)
- Eurasian siskin, Spinus spinus

== Longspurs and snow buntings ==
Order: Passeriformes Family: Calcariidae

The Calcariidae are a family of birds that had been traditionally grouped with the New World sparrows, but differ in a number of respects and are usually found in open grassy areas.

- Snow bunting, Plectrophenax nivalis
- Lapland longspur, Calcarius lapponicus

== Buntings ==
Order: Passeriformes Family: Emberizidae

The emberizids are a large family of passerine birds. They are seed-eating birds with distinctively shaped bills. Many emberizid species have distinctive head patterns.

- House bunting, Emberiza sahari (A)
- Pallas's reed bunting, Emberiza pallasi (A)
- Common reed bunting, Emberiza schoeniclus
- Yellow-browed bunting, Emberiza chrysophrys (A)
- Chestnut bunting, Emberiza rutila (A)
- Yellow-breasted bunting, Emberiza aureola
- Little bunting, Emberiza pusilla
- Rustic bunting, Emberiza rustica
- Black-faced bunting, Emberiza spodocephala (A)
- Black-headed bunting, Emberiza melanocephala
- Red-headed bunting, Emberiza bruniceps
- Corn bunting, Emberiza calandra
- Chestnut-eared bunting, Emberiza fucata (A)
- Rock bunting, Emberiza cia
- Grey-necked bunting, Emberiza buchanani (A)
- Cinereous bunting, Emberiza cineracea
- Cirl bunting, Emberiza cirlus
- Ortolan bunting, Emberiza hortulana
- Cretzschmar's bunting, Emberiza caesia
- Pine bunting, Emberiza leucocephalos
- Yellowhammer, Emberiza citrinella

== New World sparrows and bush tanagers ==
Order: Passeriformes Family: Passerellidae

The New World sparrows (or American sparrows) are a large family of seed-eating passerine birds with distinctively finch-like bills.

- Lark sparrow, Chondestes grammacus (A)
- American tree sparrow, Spizelloides arborea (A)
- Fox sparrow, Passerella iliaca (A)
- Dark-eyed junco, Junco hyemalis (A)
- White-throated sparrow, Zonotrichia albicollis (A)
- White-crowned sparrow, Zonotrichia leucophrys (A)
- Savannah sparrow, Passerculus sandwichensis (A)
- Lincoln's sparrow, Melospiza lincolnii (A)
- Song sparrow, Melospiza melodia (A)
- Eastern towhee, Pipilo erythrophthalmus (A)

== Oropendolas, orioles, and blackbirds ==
Order: Passeriformes Family: Icteridae

Icterids make up a family of small- to medium-sized, often colourful, New-World passerine birds. Most species have black as a predominant plumage colour, often enlivened by yellow, orange or red. The species in the family vary widely in size, shape, behaviour and colour.

- Yellow-headed blackbird, Xanthocephalus xanthocephalus (A)
- Bobolink, Dolichonyx oryzivorus (A)
- Baltimore oriole, Icterus galbula (A)
- Red-winged blackbird, Agelaius phoeniceus (A)
- Brown-headed cowbird, Molothrus ater (A)
- Common grackle, Quiscalus quiscula (A)

== New World warblers ==
Order: Passeriformes Family: Parulidae

A group of small, often colourful passerine birds restricted to the New World. Most are arboreal and insectivorous.

- Ovenbird, Seiurus aurocapilla (A)
- Northern waterthrush, Parkesia noveboracensis (A)
- Black-and-white warbler, Mniotilta varia (A)
- Prothonotary warbler, Protonotaria citrea (A-Azores)
- Golden-winged warbler, Vermivora chrysoptera (A)
- Blue-winged warbler, Vermivora cyanoptera (A)
- Tennessee warbler, Leiothlypis peregrina (A)
- Connecticut warbler, Oporornis agilis (A-Azores)
- Mourning warbler, Geothlypis philadelphia (A-Azores)
- Common yellowthroat, Geothlypis trichas (A)
- American redstart, Setophaga ruticilla (A)
- Hooded warbler, Setophaga citrina (A)
- Black-throated blue warbler, Setophaga caerulescens (A)
- Cerulean warbler, Setophaga cerulea (A)
- Northern parula, Setophaga americana (A)
- Magnolia warbler, Setophaga magnolia (A)
- Blackburnian warbler, Setophaga fusca (A)
- Blackpoll warbler, Setophaga striata (A)
- Bay-breasted warbler, Setophaga castanea (A)
- Chestnut-sided warbler, Setophaga pensylvanica (A)
- American yellow warbler, Setophaga petechia (A)
- Cape May warbler, Setophaga tigrina (A)
- Palm warbler, Setophaga palmarum (A)
- Yellow-rumped warbler, Setophaga coronata (A)
- Yellow-throated warbler, Setophaga dominica (A-Azores)
- Prairie warbler, Setophaga discolor (A-Azores)
- Black-throated green warbler, Setophaga virens (A)
- Canada warbler, Cardellina canadensis (A)
- Wilson's warbler, Cardellina pusilla (A)

== Cardinals and allies ==
Order: Passeriformes Family: Cardinalidae

Cardinals are passerine birds found in North and South America. They are also known as cardinal-grosbeaks and cardinal-buntings.

- Rose-breasted grosbeak, Pheucticus ludovicianus (A)
- Dickcissel, Spiza americana (A)
- Indigo bunting, Passerina cyanea (A)
- Blue grosbeak, Passerina caerulea (A-Azores)
- Summer tanager, Piranga rubra (A)
- Scarlet tanager, Piranga olivacea (A)

== See also ==
- Lists of birds by region
- The EBCC Atlas of European Breeding Birds
