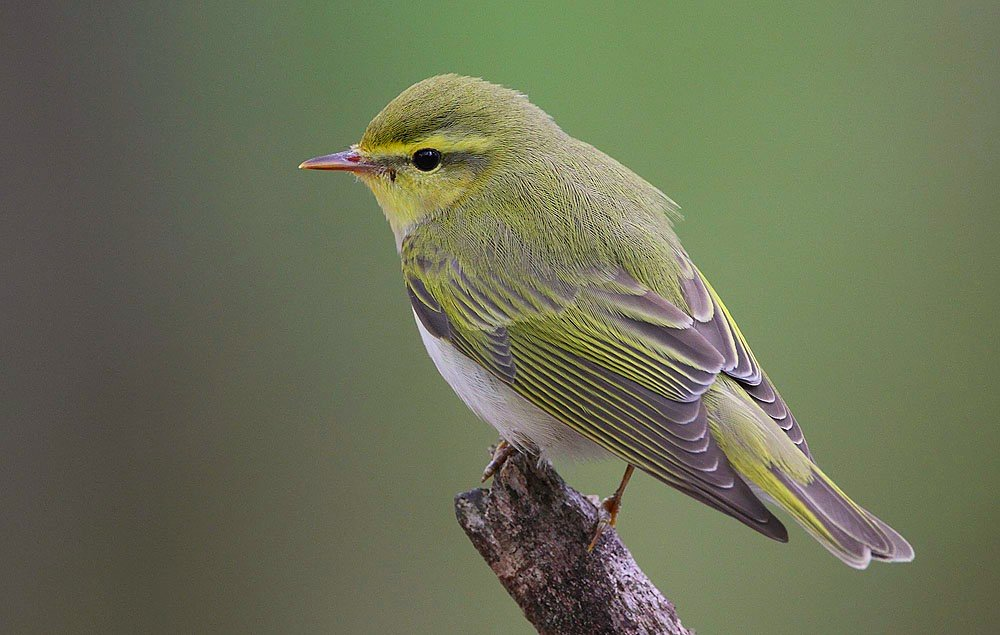
- In Inversnaid, Scotland Song

Conservation status
- Least Concern (IUCN 3.1)

Scientific classification
- Kingdom: Animalia
- Phylum: Chordata
- Class: Aves
- Order: Passeriformes
- Family: Phylloscopidae
- Genus: Phylloscopus
- Species: P. sibilatrix

Binomial name
- Phylloscopus sibilatrix (Bechstein, 1793)
- Range of P. sibilatrix Breeding Passage Non-breeding Vagrant (seasonality uncertain)

= Wood warbler =

Species of bird

The wood warbler (Phylloscopus sibilatrix) is a common and widespread leaf warbler which breeds throughout northern and temperate Europe, and just into the extreme west of Asian Russia in the southern Ural Mountains. It is strongly migratory and the entire population winters in tropical Africa.

== Taxonomy ==
The wood warbler was described in 1792 by the German naturalist Johann Matthäus Bechstein under the binomial name Motacilla sibillatrix. He described the species in more detail in 1793 but spelled the binomial name as Motacilla sibilatrix. He specified the locality as the woods of Thuringia, now in Germany. The specific epithet is from Latin sibilatrix meaning a "female whistler". Some authorities ignore the 1792 publication and date the original description to 1793 with Motacilla sibilatrix as the protonym. The wood warbler is now one of 81 species placed in the leaf warbler genus Phylloscopus that was introduced in 1826 by the German zoologist Friedrich Boie. The species is monotypic: no subspecies are recognised.

At the end of the nineteenth century the bird was also called "wood-wren".

== Habitat ==
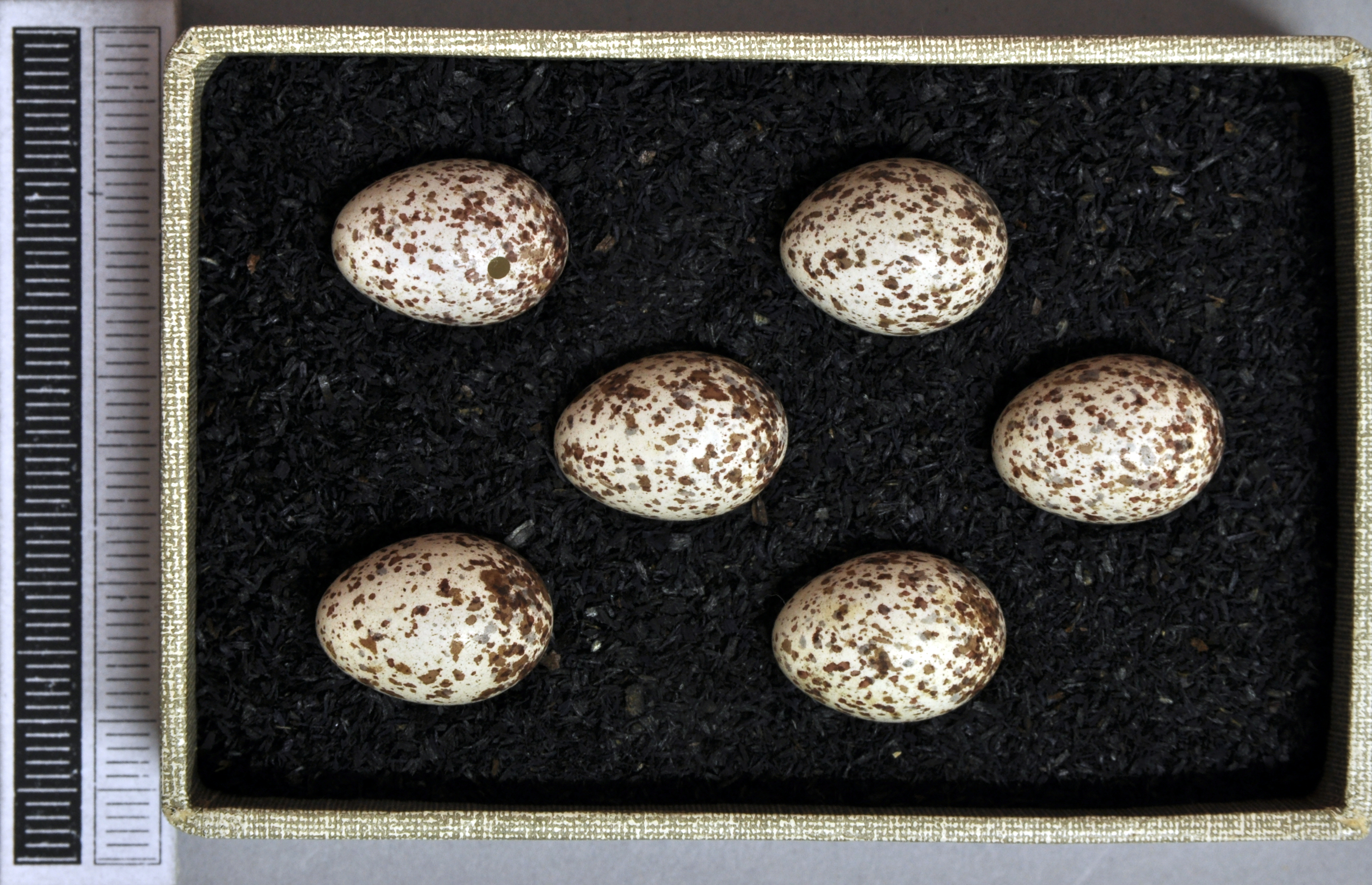
Eggs, Collection Museum Wiesbaden

This is a bird of open but shady mature woodlands, such as beech and sessile oak, with some sparse ground cover for nesting. The dome-shaped nest is built near the ground in low shrub. Six or seven eggs are laid in May; there may be a second brood. Like most Old World warblers, this small passerine is insectivorous.

The main nest predators of wood warblers breeding in the primeval habitat of Białowieża Forest, Poland, are mammals, especially medium-sized carnivores, which mostly predate nests at night using sound or olfaction. Therefore, nest survival declined with nest progression likely due to increased predator detection of older and louder chicks.

== Description ==
The wood warbler is 11–12.5 cm long, and a typical leaf warbler in appearance, green above and white below with a lemon-yellow breast. It can be distinguished from similar species, like the chiffchaff P. collybita and the willow warbler, P. trochilus by its yellow supercilium, throat and upper breast, pale tertial edges, longer primary projection, and by its shorter but broader tail.

It is a summer visitor to the United Kingdom, seen from April until August. It has declined there in recent years. It is rare in Ireland, where there is a very small but apparently stable breeding population in County Wicklow.

Various factors associated with forest structure, including slope, forest cover, proportion of broad-leaf forest, canopy height and forest edge length, all influence the occupancy rates of this declining forest species. Conservation measures are therefore required that provide and maintain the wood warblers preferred forest structure. There is also a preference for forest in the non-breeding season; however, this habitat is declining in wintering areas such as Ghana. Despite the decline in forest habitat, there has been no change in the number of wood warblers as it appears that this species can use degraded habitats, such as well-wooded farms. However, further loss of trees will likely have a negative impact on this species in the future.

== Songs ==
It has two song types, often (but not always) given alternately; a high-pitched fluid metallic trill of increasing tempo pit-pit-pitpitpitpt-t-t-ttt lasting 2–3 seconds, and a series of 3 to 5 descending piping notes of lower pitch piüü-piüü-piüü. The contact call is a soft piping note, similar to the second song type, but shorter and given singly, piü.
