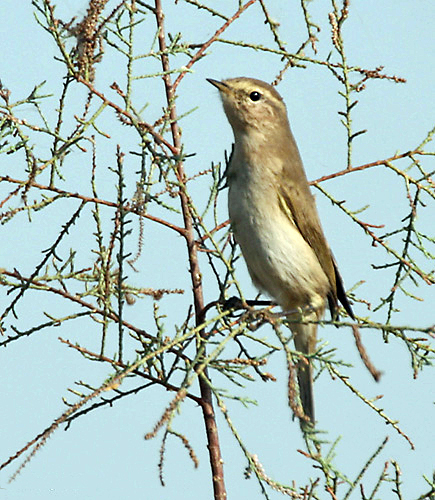

Conservation status
- Least Concern (IUCN 3.1)

Scientific classification
- Kingdom: Animalia
- Phylum: Chordata
- Class: Aves
- Order: Passeriformes
- Family: Phylloscopidae
- Genus: Phylloscopus
- Species: P. collybita
- Subspecies: P. c. tristis

Trinomial name
- Phylloscopus collybita tristis Blyth, 1843
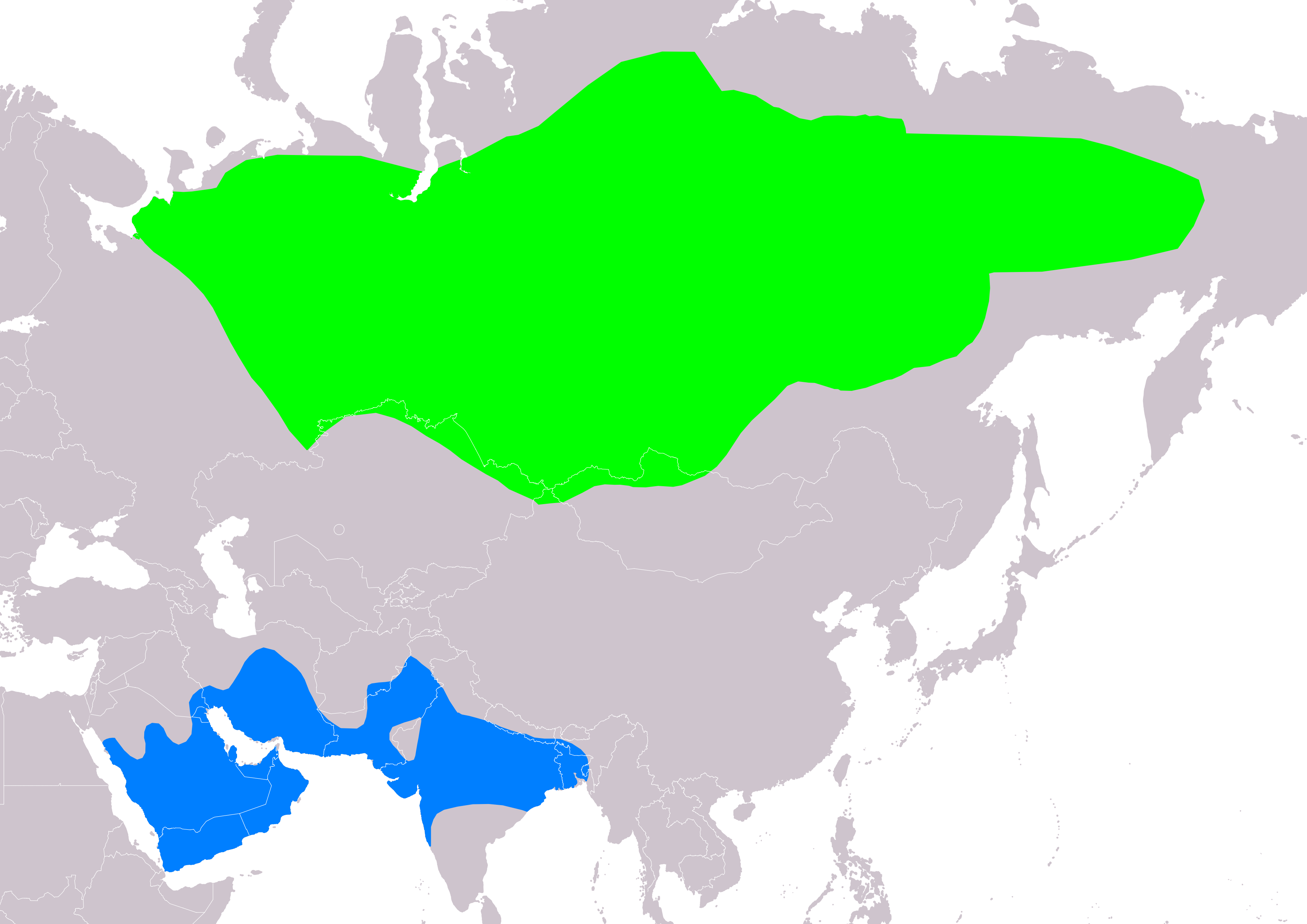
- Range of P. collybita tristis Breeding Non-breeding

Synonyms
- Phylloscopus tristis

= Siberian chiffchaff =

Subspecies of bird

Siberian chiffchaff (Phylloscopus collybita tristis) is a leaf-warbler which is usually considered a subspecies of the common chiffchaff, but may be a species in its own right.

== Range ==
Siberian chiffchaff breeds in Siberia east of the Pechora River and winters in the lower Himalayas.

=== Status in Europe and North America ===
It is also regularly recorded in western Europe in winter, and it is likely that the numbers involved have been underestimated due to uncertainties over identification criteria, lack of good data and recording policies (Sweden and Finland only accept trapped birds).

Because of their unfamiliar appearance, British records in the 1950s and 1960s were originally thought to be greenish warblers, and accepted as such by BBRC, the national rarities committee, until the records were reviewed in the 1980s.

A Gambell, Alaska bird discovered by Alexander Lin-Moore and Ethan Goodman on June 5, 2015 and seen by many birders would be the 4th (or 5th?) reported in North America.

== Appearance and vocalisations ==
It is a dull bird, grey or brownish above and whitish below, with little yellow in the plumage, and the buff-white supercilium is often longer than in the western subspecies. It has a higher pitched suitsistsuisit song and a short high-pitched cheet call. It is sometimes considered to be a full species due to its distinctive plumage and vocalisations, being similar to P. s. sindianus in these respects.

== Taxonomy ==
Common chiffchaffs (of the nominate race) and Siberian chiffchaffs do not recognize each other's songs. Pending resolution of the status of the form fulvescens, which is found where the ranges of common chiffchaff (of the race abietinus) and Siberian chiffchaff connect and may or may not be a hybrid between these, tristis is maintained in P. collybita by most checklists.
