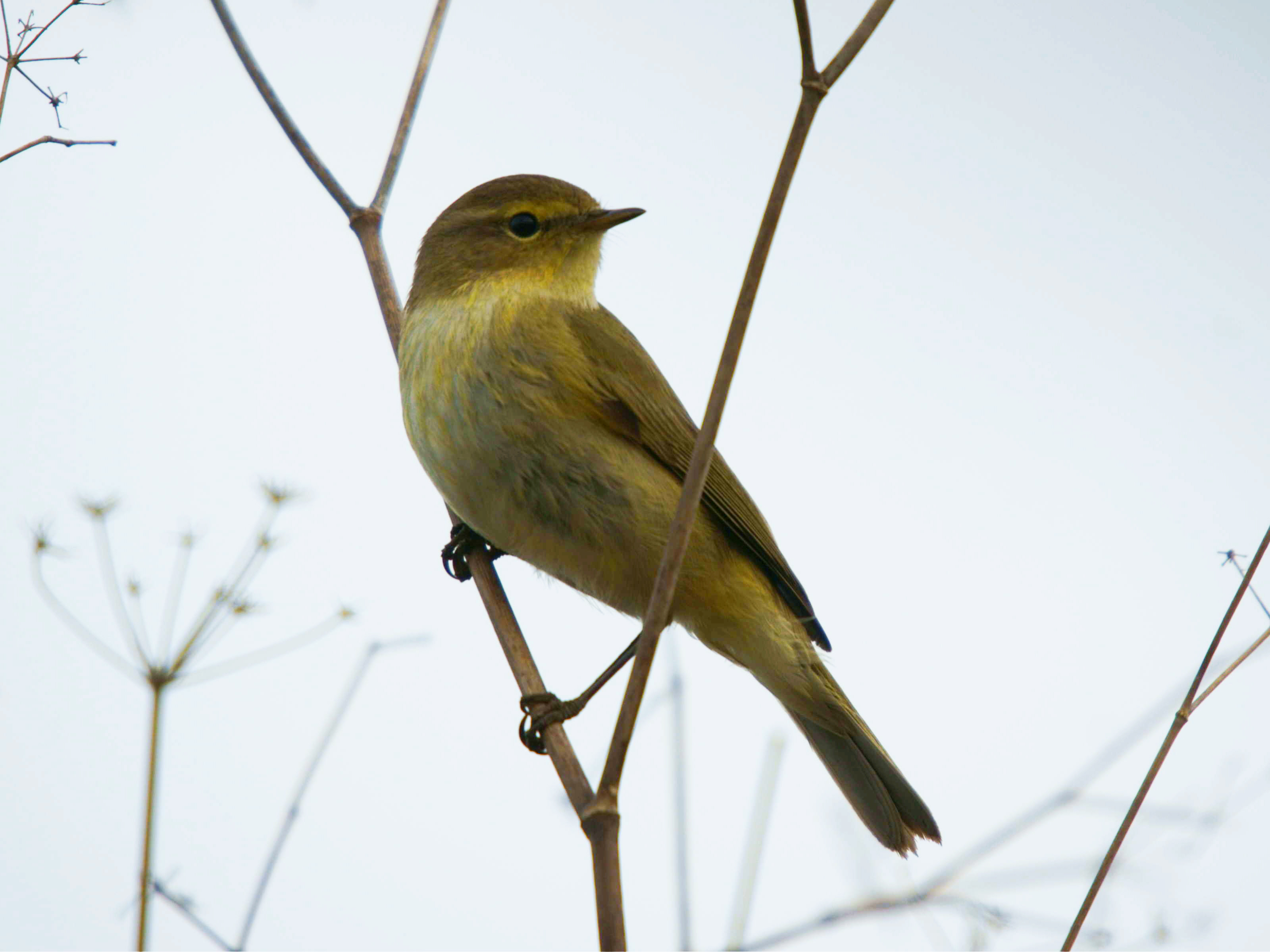
- in Viladecans, Catalonia, Spain

Conservation status
- Least Concern (IUCN 3.1)

Scientific classification
- Kingdom: Animalia
- Phylum: Chordata
- Class: Aves
- Order: Passeriformes
- Family: Phylloscopidae
- Genus: Phylloscopus
- Species: P. ibericus

Binomial name
- Phylloscopus ibericus Ticehurst, 1937
- Range of P. obericus Breeding Passage Non-breeding

Synonyms
- Phylloscopus collybita brehmi Homeyer, 1871; Phylloscopus brehmi Homeyer, 1871; Phylloscoipus collybita brehmi Ticehurst, 1937

= Iberian chiffchaff =

Species of bird

The Iberian chiffchaff (Phylloscopus ibericus) is a species of passerine belonging to the family Phylloscopidae, the leaf warblers. This species is found as a breeding bird in southwestern Europe and northwestern Africa. It winters in western Africa south of the Sahara Desert.

== Taxonomy and etymology ==
The Iberian chiffchaff was first distinguished as separate from the common chiffchaff (P. collybita) in 1871 by the German ornithologist Eugen Ferdinand von Homeyer who named it as the subspecies P. c. brehmi. However, when the holotype of P. c. brehmi was re-examined it was found to actually be an example of common chiffchaff which rendered Homeyer's name invalid. It was then decided to use the name P. c. ibericus proposed by the English ornithologist Claud B. Ticehurst in 1937 with its type locality given as Paul d'Argila, near Coimbra in Portugal. As of 2016, it is recognised as a separate species under the name Phylloscopus ibericus

The genus name Phylloscopus is from Ancient Greek phullon, "leaf", and skopos, "seeker" (from skopeo, "to watch"). The specific ibericus is Latin for "Iberian". The name "chiffchaff" is onomatopoeic, referring to the repetitive chiff-chaff song of the common chiffchaff (Phylloscopus collybita). There are similar names in some other European languages, such as the Dutch Tjiftjaf, the German Zilpzalp and Welsh siff-saff.

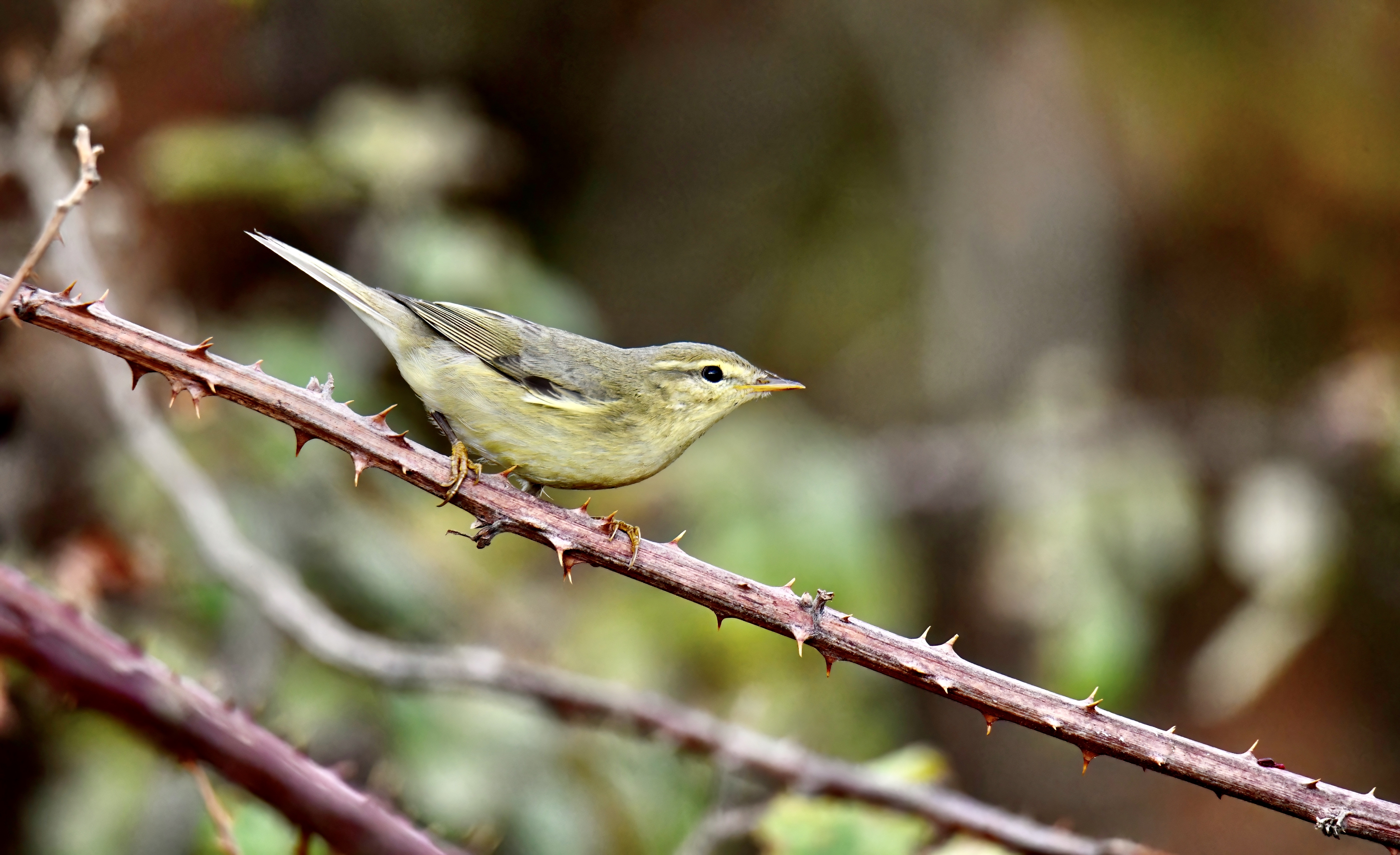
Iberian chiffchaff in Setúbal, Portugal

Due to current research on these species, it has been discovered that Iberian chiffchaff is the most divergent among the members of the chiffchaff species complex. The Iberian chiffchaff is slightly larger and paler, with more olive-coloured plumage.

== Identification ==
The Iberian chiffchaff is told apart from the common chiffchaff mainly on its song but it also has plumage differences such as the upperparts being a cleaner green colour with no brown hue. The breast is yellow and the belly is white, closer in appearance to a willow warbler (P. trochilus) than the common chiffchaff. This resemblance to willow warbler is enhanced by the distinct dark eyestripe. The voice is similar to common chiff chaff but is not a disyllabic but introduces other elements, there is a chiff-chaff like call, but this is faster and more monotonous than the common chiffchaff song, some repeated rattles and then some long drawn out whistles. This has been written down as "chiff-chiff-chiff-chiff-dr-dr-dr-dr-swit-swit-swit".

== Distribution and habitat ==
The Iberian chiffchaff is a summer visitor to its breeding range in Spain, Portugal and Morocco. In the Iberian Peninsula it breeds in the west and north, the northern Spanish population breeds from Galicia to Navarre in the Pyrenees, with a small number breeding in the Pyrénées-Atlantiques in France with separate scattered populations in the mountains of southern Spain. In Portugal it is mainly found in Trás-os-Montes and Alto Douro in the north with another separate population in southern Portugal from Estremadura south to the Algarve. It also breeds in northern Morocco. It is found in humid areas, being assocuiated with riparian habitats in the south, although in the north they are found in a deciduous woodland with well-developed undergrowth and are less dependant on riparian habitats.
