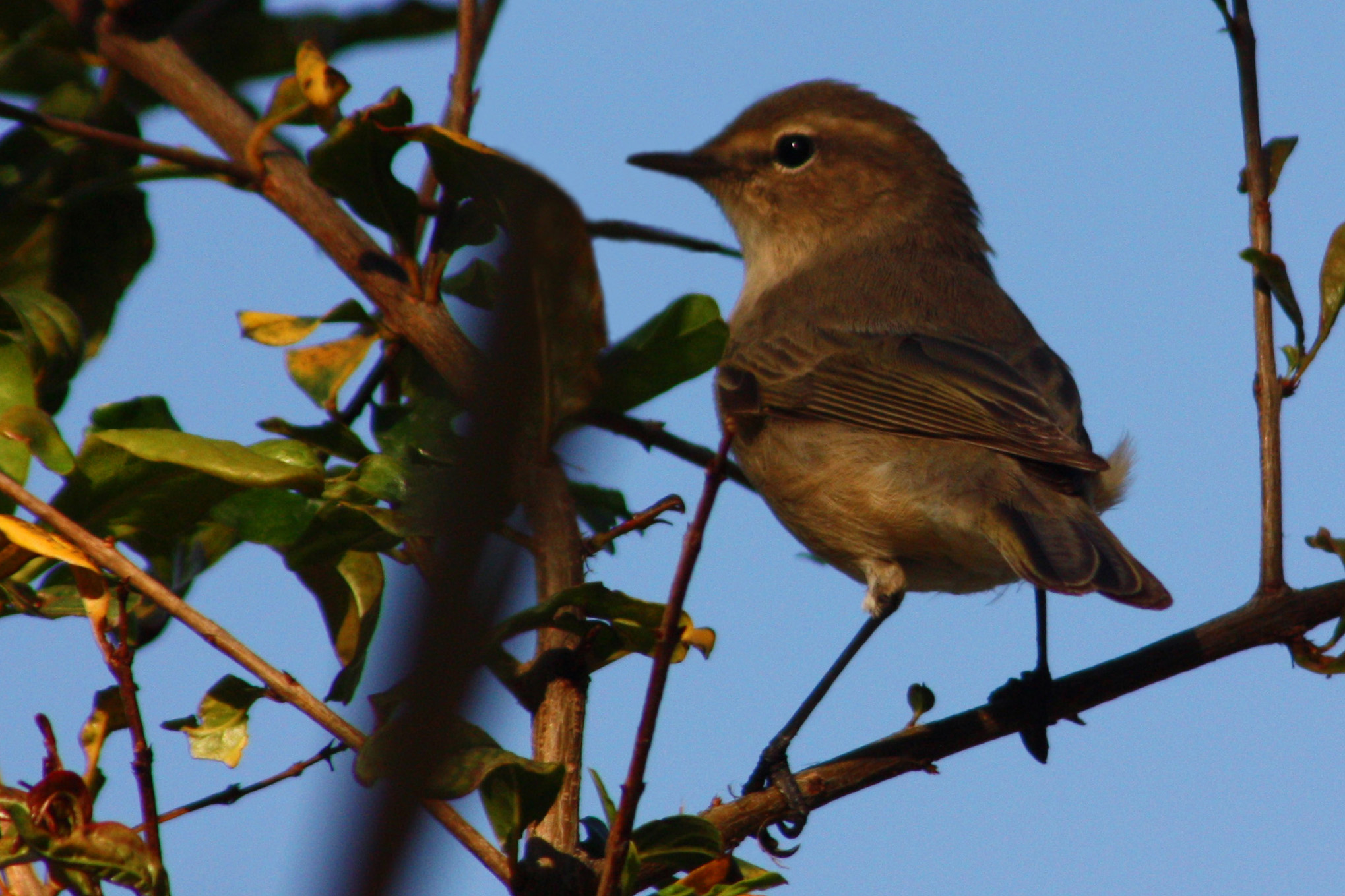
- In Oman

Conservation status
- Least Concern (IUCN 3.1)

Scientific classification
- Kingdom: Animalia
- Phylum: Chordata
- Class: Aves
- Order: Passeriformes
- Family: Phylloscopidae
- Genus: Phylloscopus
- Species: P. neglectus

Binomial name
- Phylloscopus neglectus Hume, 1870

= Plain leaf warbler =

Species of bird

The plain leaf warbler (Phylloscopus neglectus) is a species of Old World warbler in the family Phylloscopidae. It is found in Afghanistan, Bahrain, India, Iran, Oman, Pakistan, Russia, Tajikistan, Turkmenistan, United Arab Emirates, and Uzbekistan.

Its natural habitat is temperate forests.
