= Chaffinch (disambiguation) =

Chaffinch is a name applied to some birds in the genus Fringilla and may refer to:

- Eurasian chaffinch (Fringilla coelebs)
- African chaffinch (Fringilla spodiogenys)
- Azores chaffinch (Fringilla moreletti)
- Canary Islands chaffinch (Fringilla canariensis)
- Madeira chaffinch (Fringilla maderensis)
- Gran Canaria blue chaffinch (Fringilla polatzeki)
- Tenerife blue chaffinch (Fringilla teydea)

== See also ==
- USS Chaffinch, multiple ships of that name
