= Pollatschek =

Pollatschek and Polatschek are German-language surnames, Germanized spellings of Polaczek or Poláček.. Notable people with the surname include:

- John Pollatschek (born 1943), Scottish footballer
- Susanne Pollatschek (born 1977), Scottish actress
- Viktor Polatschek (1889-1948), Austrian clarinetist
