= Polatzek =

Polatzek is a Germanized spelling of Polaczek or Poláček. Notable people with the surname include:

- Carl Polatzek (1803–1850), Austrian military officer and politician
- Johann Polatzek (1838/1839–1927), Austrian ornithologist
