= Blue chaffinch =

Blue chaffinch may refer to one of two different bird species:

- Gran Canaria blue chaffinch, Fringilla polatzeki
- Tenerife blue chaffinch, Fringilla teydea
