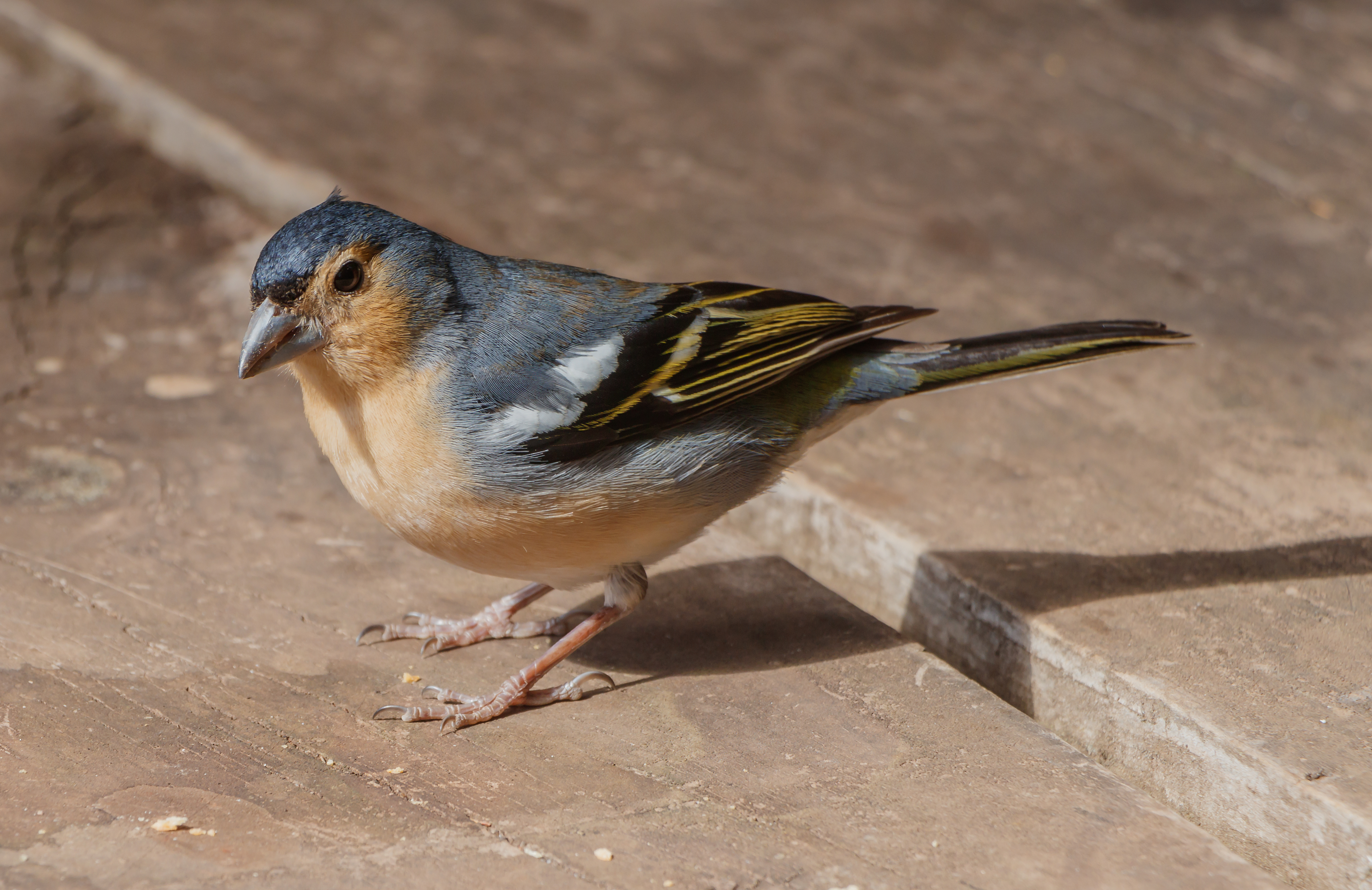
- Fringilla canariensis canariensis male, La Gomera, Canary Islands

Scientific classification
- Kingdom: Animalia
- Phylum: Chordata
- Class: Aves
- Order: Passeriformes
- Family: Fringillidae
- Genus: Fringilla
- Species: F. canariensis

Binomial name
- Fringilla canariensis Vieillot, 1817

Synonyms
- Fringilla tintillon Barker-Webb, Berthelot, & Moquin-Tandon, 1841

= Canary Islands chaffinch =

Species of bird

The Canary Islands chaffinch (Fringilla canariensis) is a species of passerine bird in the finch family Fringillidae. It was formerly considered to be a subspecies group within the widespread Eurasian chaffinch F. coelebs, but was recently revised to be a species in its own right, following a genetic and morphological analysis of the genus Fringilla in 2021. It is endemic to the Canary Islands, and is thought to be largely resident within its distribution.

== Taxonomy ==
There are four recognised subspecies:

- F. c. bakeri Illera, Rando, M. Hernández, Claramunt, & A. Martin, 2018 – Gran Canaria
- F. c. canariensis Vieillot, 1817 – Tenerife, La Gomera
- F. c. ombriosa Hartert, 1913 – El Hierro
- F. c. palmae Tristram, 1889 – La Palma

== Description ==
The Canary Islands chaffinch is similar in size to the Eurasian chaffinch at around 15–16 cm long, but differs markedly in plumage of the male, with a dark blue-grey mantle, and lighter pink face and breast, and whiter belly and undertail. As with all chaffinch species, the female is duller brown. The bill is similar to Eurasian and African chaffinches, not distinctly large like the related Azores chaffinch.

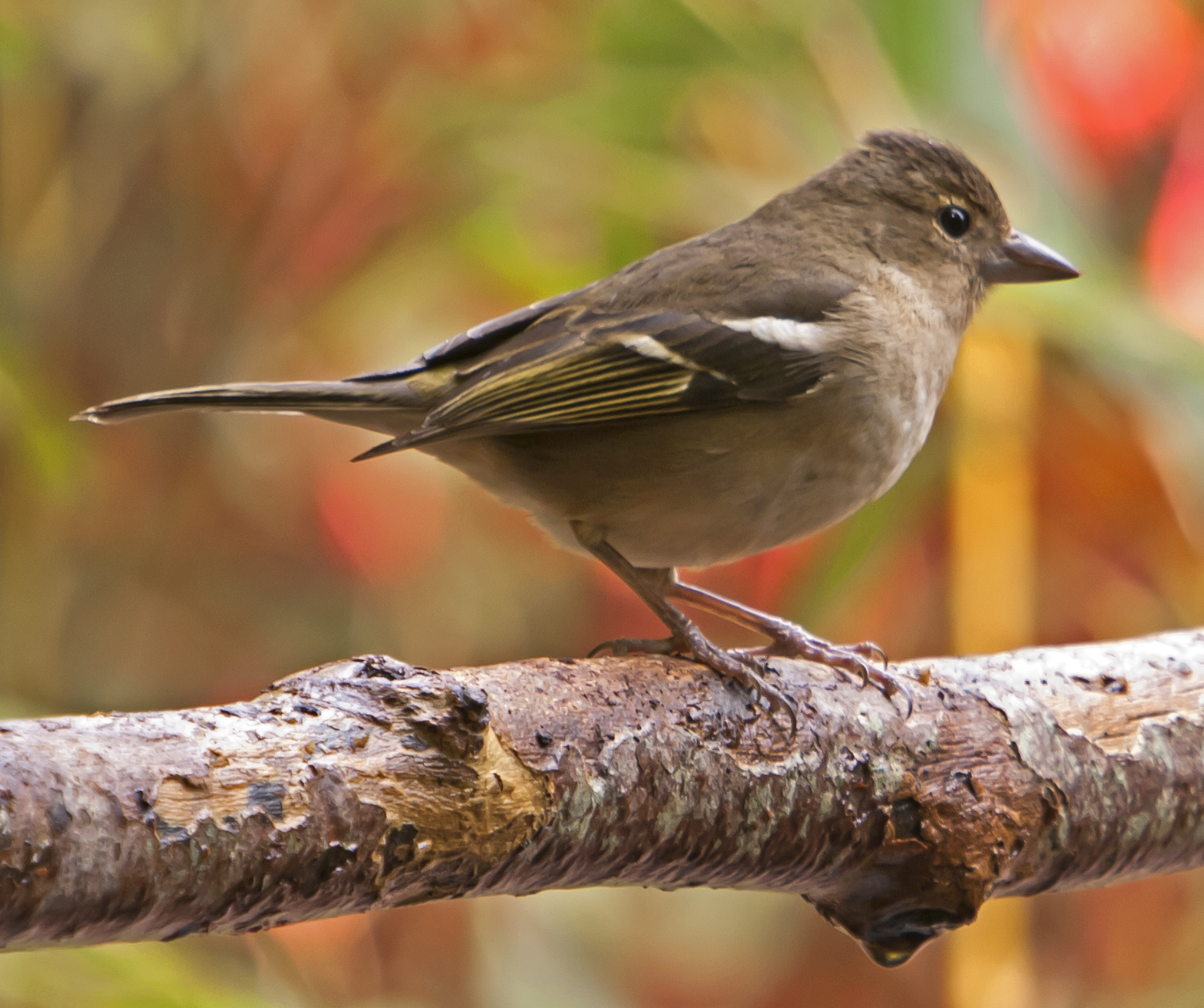
F. c. bakeri female, Gran Canaria

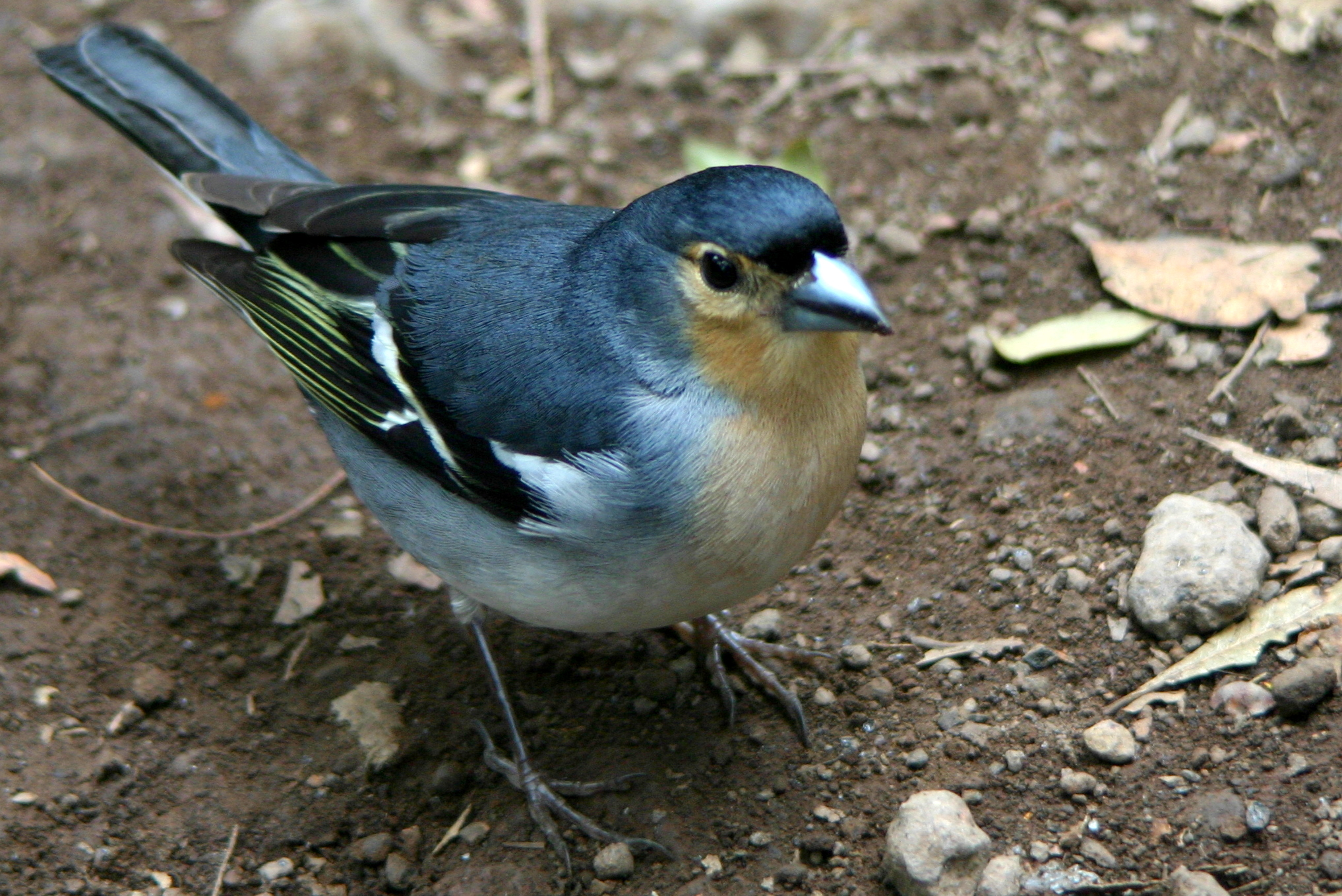
F. c. palmae male, La Palma
