= USS Chaffinch =

USS Chaffinch may refer to one of the following United States Navy ships named after the common chaffinch:

- USS Chaffinch (AM-81), was built in 1928 by Bethlehem Shipbuilding in Quincy, Massachusetts, as Trimont. She was purchased by the Navy on 29 November 1940 and commissioned 16 July 1941.
- USS Chaffinch (AMCU-18), the former USS LSI(L)-694 converted to a coastal minesweeper in 1952
