= Vinkensport =

Competitive animal sport involving chaffinches

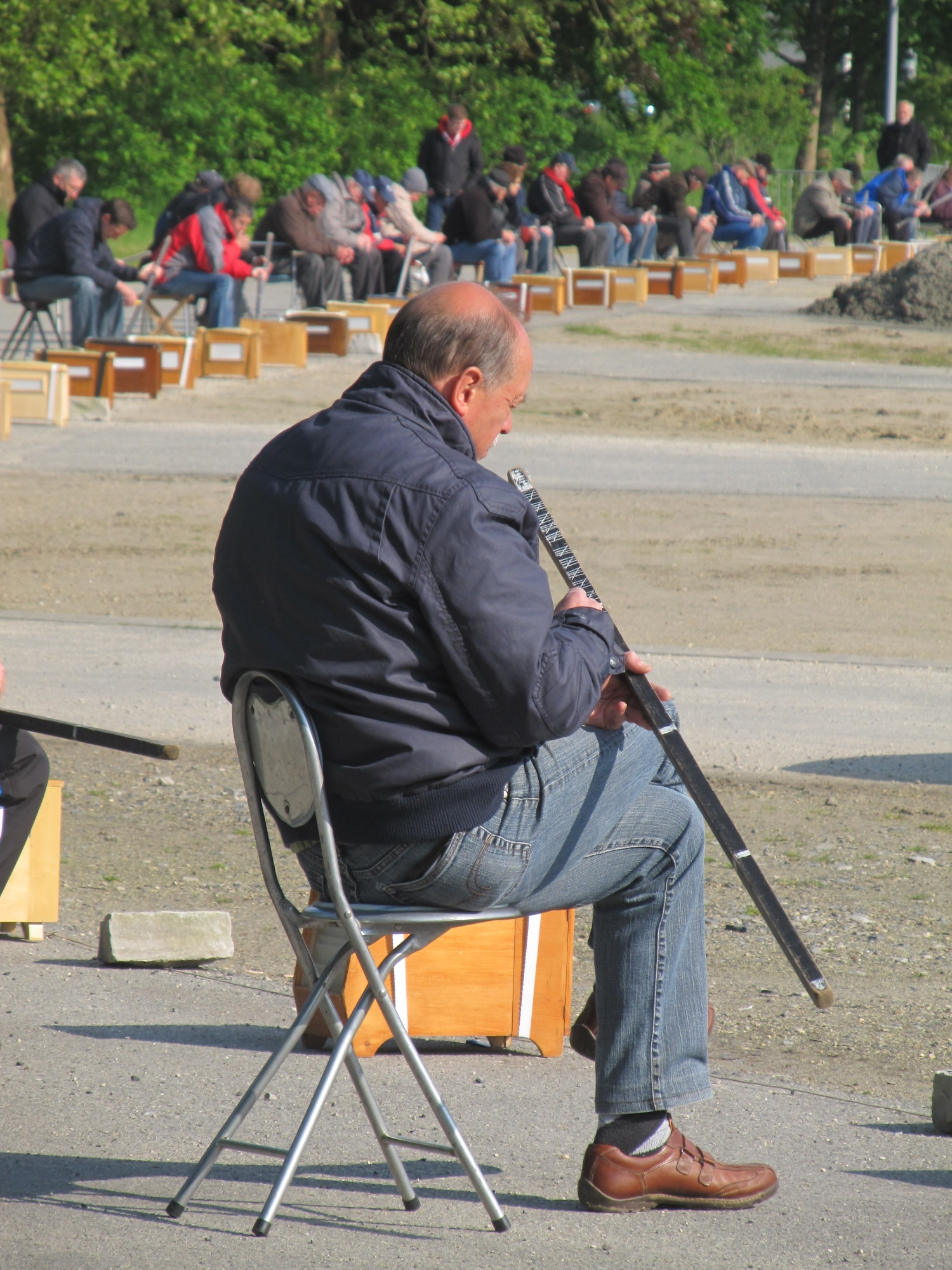
- Vinkensport in Deinze. The long black rod is used for counting.
- Nicknames: vinkenzetting, finching
- First played: 1596, Flanders
- Clubs: yes

Characteristics
- Contact: none
- Mixed-sex: yes
- Type: Animal sport

Vinkensport (Dutch for "finch sport") is a competitive animal sport in which male common chaffinches are made to compete for the highest number of bird calls in an hour. Also called vinkenzetting ("finch sitting"). It is primarily active in Flanders, the Dutch-speaking region of Belgium.

Vinkensport traces its origins to competitions held by Flemish merchants in 1596, and is considered part of traditional Flemish culture. As of 2007, it was estimated that there are over 13,000 enthusiasts, called vinkeniers ("finchers"), breeding 10,000 birds every year. Animal rights activists oppose the sport.

== Description ==
Song of the common chaffinch

In a contest, a row of small cages, each housing a single male finch, is lined up approximately six feet apart along a street. The proximity of the cages increases the number of calls, as the birds sing for mates and to establish territory. A timekeeper begins and ends the contest with a red flag.

Every time a bird sings a correct terminating flourish to their call—most often transcribed as susk-e-wiet—a tally mark in chalk is made on a long wooden stick. The bird singing its song the most times during one hour wins the contest. Champion finches regularly sing hundreds of calls in contests.

== History and practices ==
The earliest known records of vinkeniers are from 1596 (with some sources advocating a slightly earlier 1593 origin) with Flemish merchants competing. By the late nineteenth century, vinkenzetting's popularity had diminished significantly, but it saw a resurgence after the First World War. As of 2007, it was estimated that there are over 13,000 vinkeniers breeding 10,000 birds every year. However, the popularity of this folk sport is waning in the 21st century. There was also a museum of the sport (Nationaal Volkssportmuseum Vinkensport) in the village of Hulste in the Harelbeke municipality of Belgium until 2010.

Vinkeniers use a variety of methods to increase the number of calls in their birds. Techniques to develop singing aptitude include selective breeding programs, high-protein diets, and stimulating them with music and recordings of bird song. As wild finches generally begin singing during the spring mating season, keepers may also use artificial lights placed in aviaries to encourage increased song.

Some vinkeniers claim that finches from the different regions of Belgium sing in different dialects; with birds from the Dutch-speaking Flanders singing "in Dutch" and those from the French-speaking Wallonia singing undesirably "in French". The use of "Dutch" and "Walloon" to describe these two supposed types of finches has been suggested to refer to a simple difference in calling not literally linked to either the Flemish or Walloon communities of Belgium, and some linguists even suggest that "Walloon" simply means "foreign". While minute regional differences (a.k.a. dialects) in song have been observed in the chaffinch (also within Belgium), the differences have only been reliably distinguishable by the use of sonograms. Taxonomically, there are no officially recognized subspecies of chaffinch within Belgium.

=== Caribbean and South American-based contests ===
Speed-singing contests for finches are also a common event in Guyana, Trinidad, Suriname and Brazil. The male finches are placed in cages on poles about one foot apart. The first finch to reach 50 songs wins. The illegal importation of these finches from immigrants of these countries has challenged authorities in New York City.

=== Cheating incidents ===
As with other sports, vinkensport has had its cheating scandals, as well as accusations of artificial enhancement. One finch sang a record 1,278 susk-e-weits in one hour, and the owner was later accused of doping the bird with testosterone. After one contestant sang exactly the same number of calls in three rounds, the box was opened and a mini CD player was discovered within.

=== Opposition to the sport ===
...Blinded ere yet a-wing
By the red-hot needle thou,
I stand and wonder how,
So zestfully thou canst sing!
Resenting not such wrong,
Thy grievous pain forgot,
Eternal dark thy lot,
Groping thy whole life long;
After that stab of fire;
Enjailed in pitiless wire...

— The Blinded Bird Thomas Hardy

Throughout much of its history, certain attributes of the sport have garnered criticism. Early proponents of the sport would blind birds with hot needles in order to reduce visual distractions. Thomas Hardy—the celebrated English author and poet who was also an antivivisectionist and member of the RSPCA—is said to have written his poem "The Blinded Bird" as a protest against the practice. In 1920, a campaign by blind World War I veterans banned the practice, and today the birds are kept in small wooden boxes that let air in but keep distractions out.

Modern animal rights activists, such as those from the Flemish Bird Protection Society, accuse trainers of "brainwashing" birds into singing more than is natural or healthy by playing looped recordings of finch calls, and that caging birds in the intentionally small and dark contest boxes is cruel. The finch is a popular aviary bird in many countries and it is forbidden in the European Union to catch birds in the wild, despite vinkeniers purporting that wild birds sing better than captive ones. Though chaffinch populations are currently not considered to be threatened, a 2002 court case at the Belgian Constitutional Court upheld a 1979 EU law banning the capture of wild finches.

== See also ==
- Animals in sport
