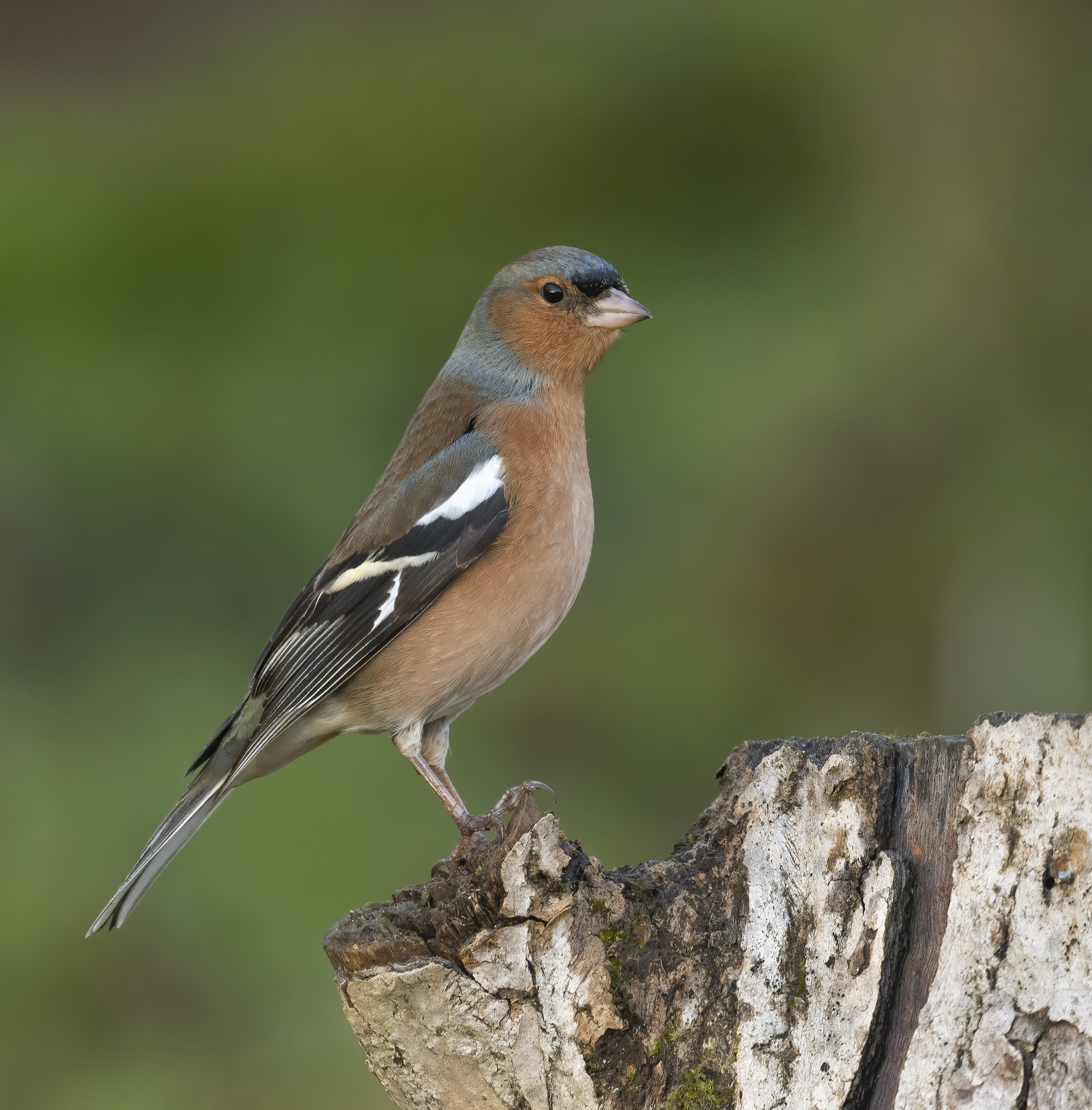
- Male in Scotland
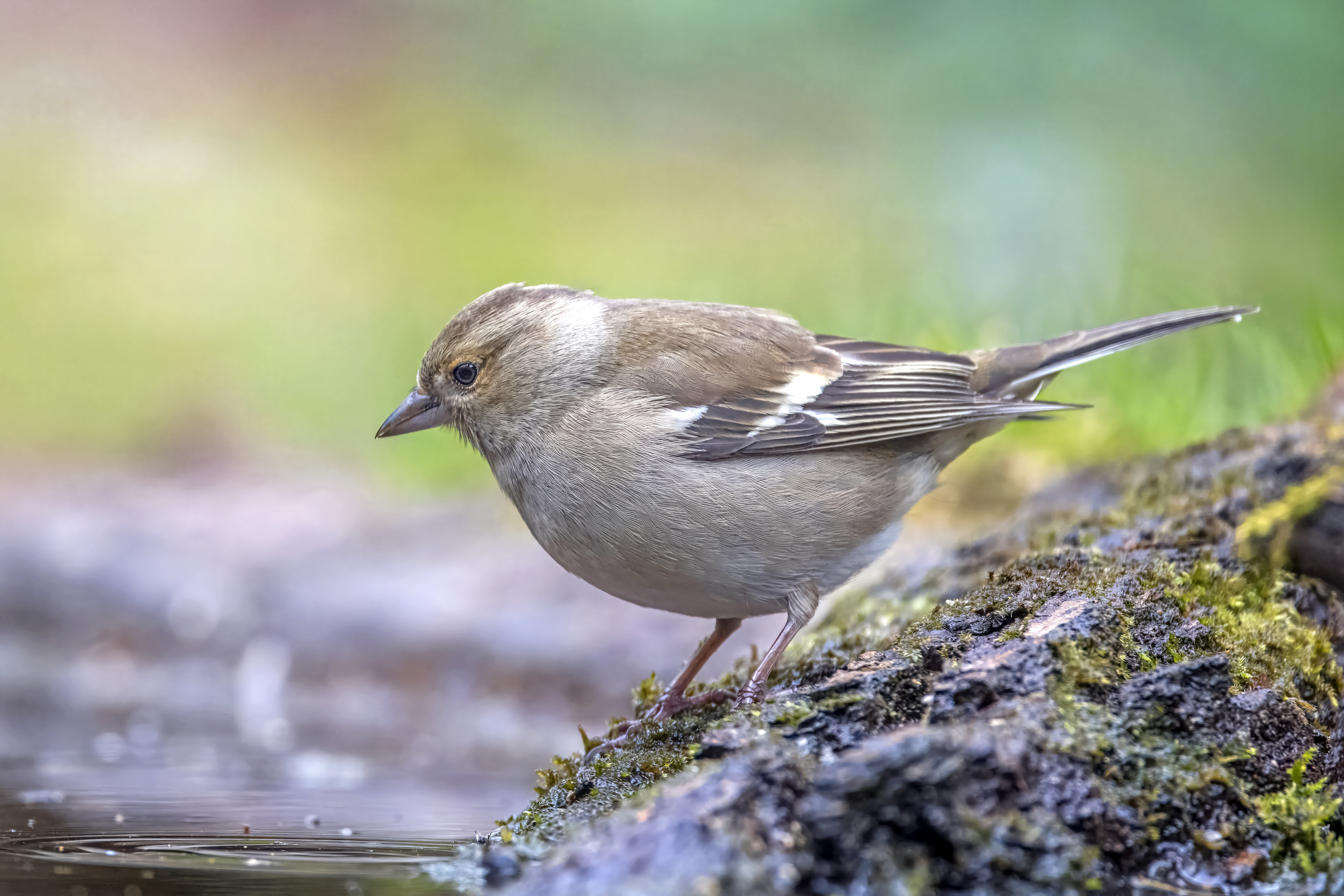
- Female in the Netherlands Song of male in Surrey, England

Conservation status
- Least Concern (IUCN 3.1)

Scientific classification
- Kingdom: Animalia
- Phylum: Chordata
- Class: Aves
- Order: Passeriformes
- Family: Fringillidae
- Genus: Fringilla
- Species: F. coelebs

Binomial name
- Fringilla coelebs Linnaeus, 1758
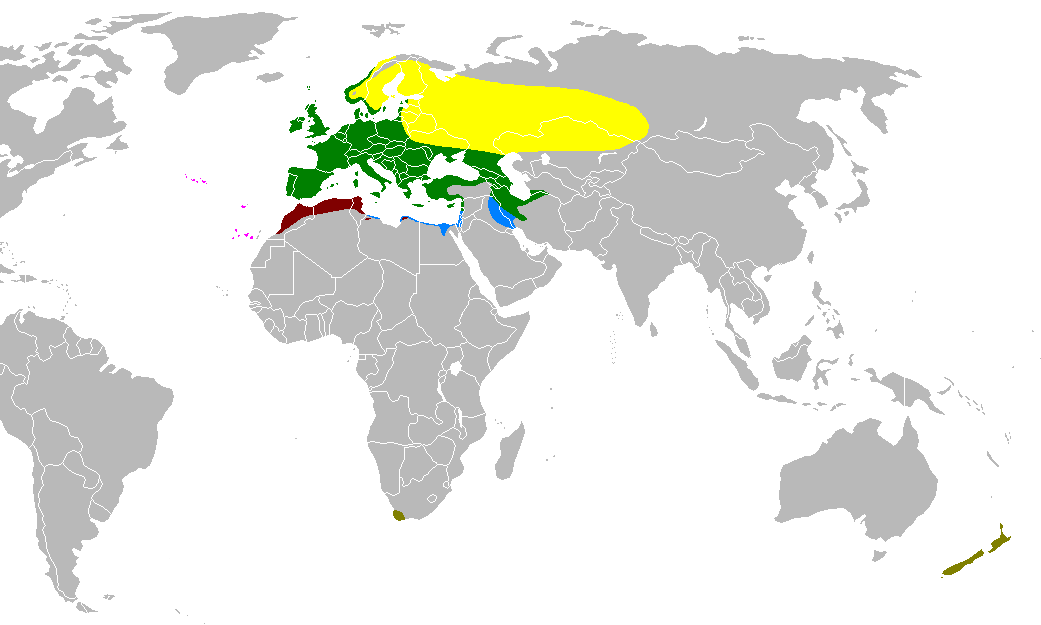
- Distribution map Summer Resident Winter Introduced; Now treated as separate species: canariensis, moreletti and maderensis spodiogenys

= Eurasian chaffinch =

Species of bird

The Eurasian chaffinch, common chaffinch, or simply the chaffinch (Fringilla coelebs) is a common and widespread small passerine bird – in the finch family. The male is brightly coloured with a blue-grey cap and rust-red underparts. The female is more subdued in colouring, but both sexes have two contrasting white wing bars and white sides to the tail. The male bird has a strong voice and sings from exposed perches to attract a mate.

The chaffinch breeds in much of Europe, across the Palearctic to Siberia. The female builds a nest with a deep cup in the fork of a tree. The clutch is typically four or five eggs, which hatch in about 13 days. The chicks fledge in around 14 days, but are fed by both adults for several weeks after leaving the nest. Outside the breeding season, chaffinches form flocks in open countryside and forage for seeds on the ground. During the breeding season, they forage on trees for invertebrates, especially caterpillars, and feed these to their young. They are partial migrants; birds breeding in warmer regions are sedentary, while those breeding in the colder northern areas of their range winter further south.

The eggs and nestlings of the chaffinch are taken by a variety of mammalian and avian predators. Its large numbers and huge range mean that chaffinches are classed as of least concern by the International Union for Conservation of Nature.

== Taxonomy ==
The Eurasian chaffinch was described by the Swedish naturalist Carl Linnaeus in 1758 in the 10th edition of his Systema Naturae under its current binomial name, Fringilla coelebs. Fringilla is the Latin word for finch, while coelebs, a variant of caelebs, means unmarried or single (as in celibate). Linnaeus remarked that during the Swedish winter, only the female birds migrated south through Belgium to Italy.

The English name comes from the Old English ceaffinc, where ceaf is "chaff" and finc "finch". Chaffinches were likely given this name because after farmers thresh their crops, these birds sometimes spend weeks picking through heaps of discarded chaff for grain. The chaffinch is one of the many birds depicted in the marginal decoration of the 15th-century English illuminated manuscript the Sherborne Missal. The English naturalist William Turner described the Eurasian chaffinch in his book on birds Avium praecipuarum, published in 1544. Although the text is in Latin, Turner gives the English name as chaffinche and lists two folk names: sheld-appel and spink. The word sheld is a dialectal word meaning pied or multicoloured (as in shelduck). Appel may be related to Alp, an obsolete word for a bullfinch. The name spink is probably derived from the bird's call note. The names spink and shell apple are among the many folk names listed for the common chaffinch by Reverend Charles Swainson in his Provincial Names and Folk Lore of British Birds (1885).

The Fringillidae are chiefly seed-eaters with stout conical bills. They have similar skull morphologies, nine large primaries, 12 tail feathers and no crop. In all species, the female builds the nest, incubates the eggs, and broods the young. Finches are divided into two subfamilies, the Carduelinae, containing around 28 genera with 141 species and the Fringillinae containing a single genus, Fringilla, with four species: the common chaffinch (F. coelebs), the Gran Canaria blue chaffinch (F. polatzeki), the Tenerife blue chaffinch (F. teydea), and the brambling (F. montifringilla). Fringilline finches raise their young almost entirely on arthropods, while the cardueline finches raise their young on regurgitated seeds.

=== Subspecies ===
A number of subspecies of the Eurasian chaffinch have been described, based principally on the differences in the pattern and colour of the adult male plumage.

Within the "coelebs group", the gradual clinal variation over the large geographic range and the extensive intergradation means that the geographical limits and acceptance of the various subspecies varies between authorities. The International Ornithologists' Union lists 11 subspecies from this group, whereas Peter Clement in the Birds of the World lists seven and considers the features of the subspecies balearica (Mallorca), caucasica (the southern Caucasus), schiebeli (southern Greece, Crete and western Turkey), and tyrrhenica (Corsica) to fall within the variation of the nominate subspecies. He also suggests that the subspecies alexandrovi, sarda, solomkoi, and syriaca may represent variations of the nominate subspecies.

The authors of a 2009 molecular phylogenetic study on the three subspecies that were recognised on the Canary Islands concluded that they are sufficiently distinct in both genotype and phenotype to be considered as separate species within the genus Fringilla. They also proposed a revised distribution of the subspecies on the islands in which the birds on La Palma (palmae) and El Hierro (ombrioso) are grouped together as a single subspecies, while the current canariensis subspecies is split into two, with one subspecies occurring only on Gran Canaria and the other on La Gomera and Tenerife. The results of a study published in 2018 confirmed the earlier findings. The authors formerly described the Gran Canaria variety as a subspecies and coined the trinomial name Fringilla coelebs bakeri.

coelebs group

- F. c. alexandrovi Zarudny, 1916 – northern Iran
- F. c. caucasica Serebrovski, 1925 – Balkans and northern Greece to northern Turkey, central and eastern Caucasus and northwestern Iran
- F. c. coelebs Linnaeus, 1758 (nominate subspecies) – Eurasia, from western Europe and Asia Minor to Siberia
- F. c. balearica von Jordans, 1923 – Iberian Peninsula and the Balearic Islands
- F. c. gengleri O. Kleinschmidt, 1909 – British Isles
- F. c. sarda Rapine, 1925 – Sardinia
- F. c. schiebeli Erwin Stresemann, 1925 – southern Greece, Crete and western Turkey
- F. c. solomkoi Menzbier & Sushkin, 1913 – Crimean Peninsula and southwestern Caucasus
- F. c. syriaca J. M. Harrison, 1945 – Cyprus, southeastern Turkey to northern Iran and Jordan
- F. c. transcaspia Zarudny, 1916 – northeastern Iran and southwestern Turkmenistan
- F. c. tyrrhenica Schiebel, 1910 – Corsica
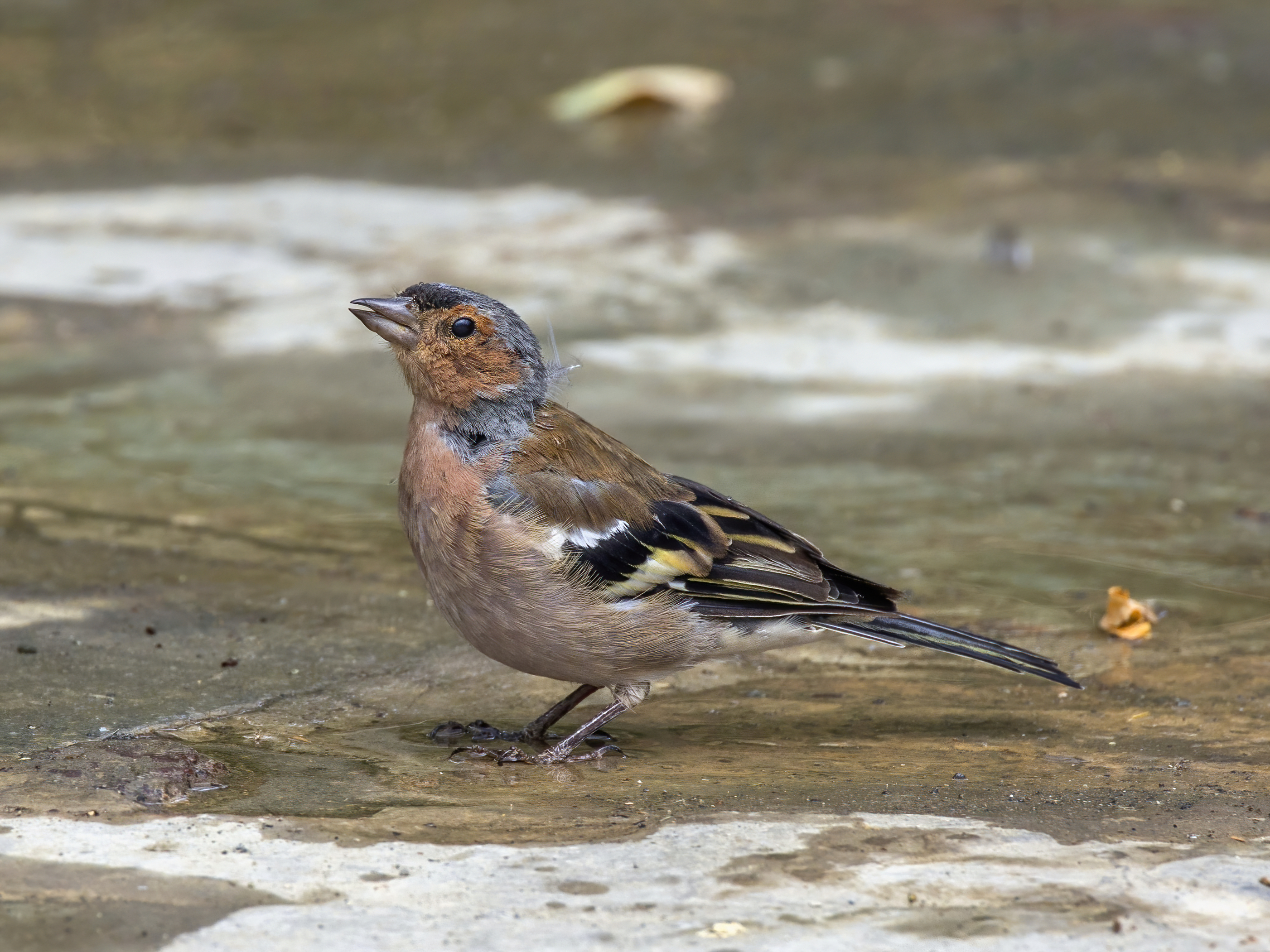
Male F. c. syriaca, Cyprus

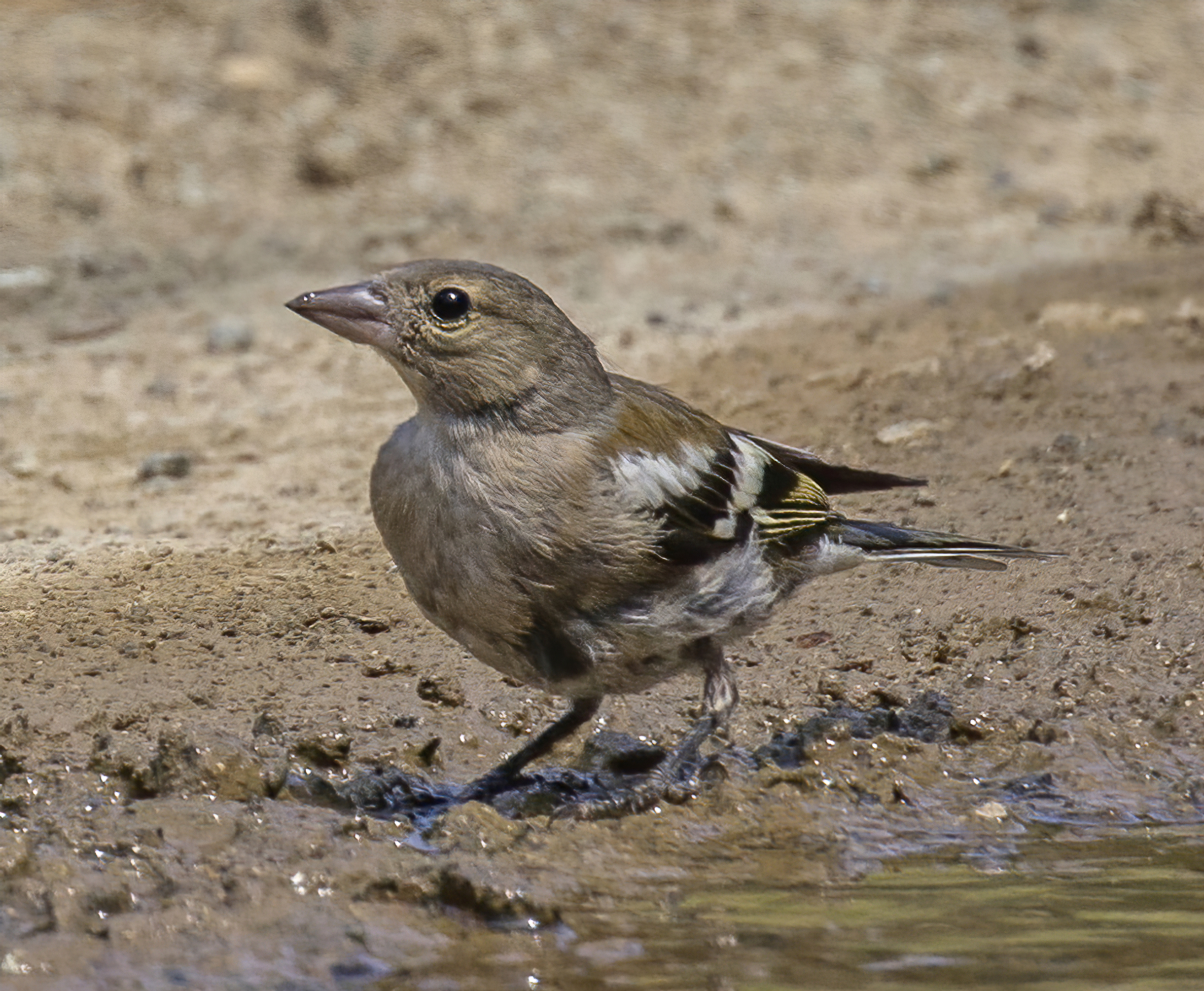
Female F. c. syriaca, Cyprus

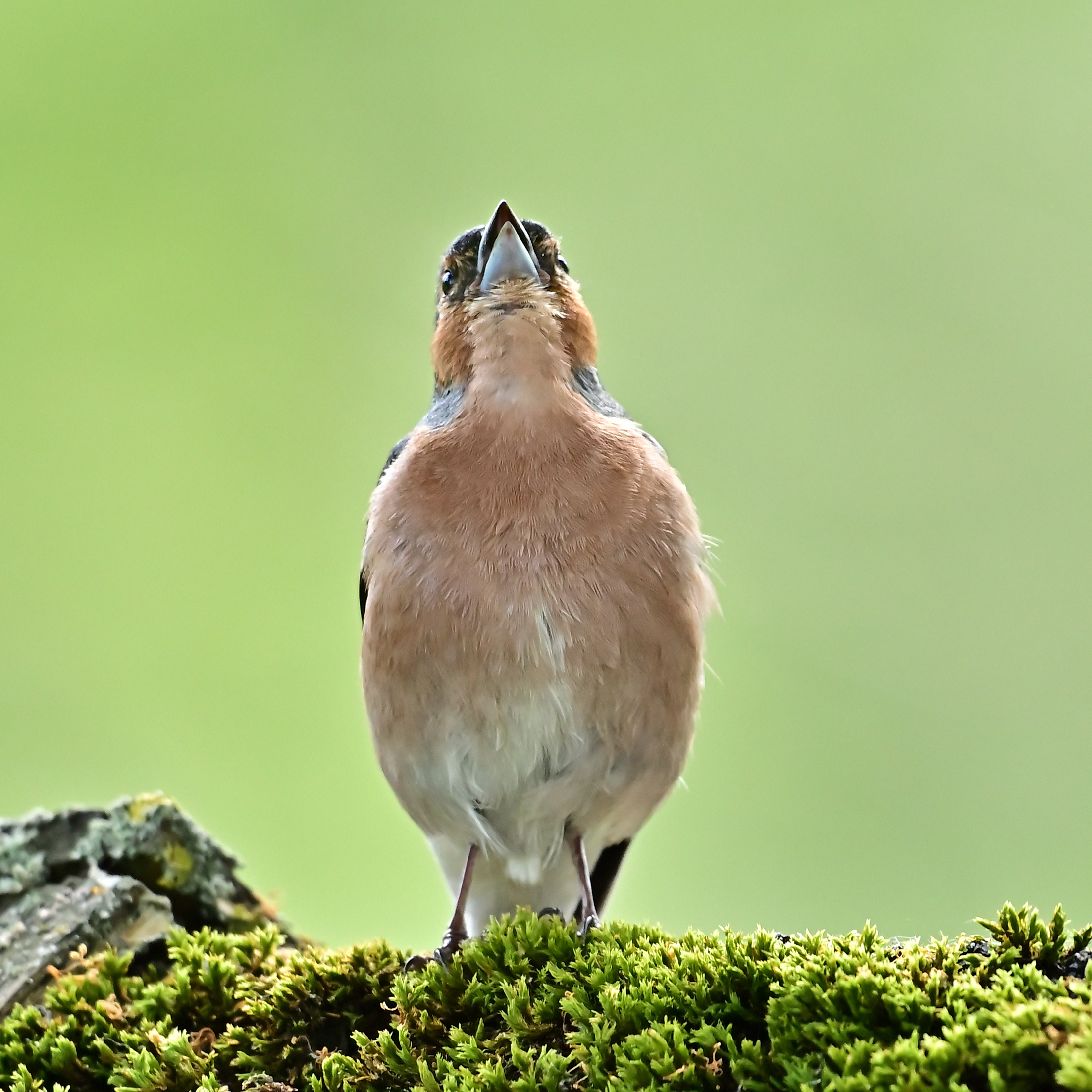
Singing chaffinch

== Description ==
The Eurasian chaffinch is about 14.5 cm (5.7 in) long, with a wingspan of 24.5–28.5 cm (9.6–11.2 in) and a weight of 18–29 g (0.63–1.02 oz). The adult male of the nominate subspecies has a black forehead and a blue-grey crown, nape and upper mantle. The rump is a light olive-green; the lower mantle and scapulars form a brown saddle. The side of head, throat and breast are a dull rust-red merging to a pale creamy-pink on the belly. The central pair of tail feathers are dark grey with a black shaft streak. The rest of the tail is black apart from the two outer feathers on each side which have white wedges. Each wing has a contrasting white panel on the coverts and a buff-white bar on the secondaries and inner primaries. The flight feathers are black with white on the basal portions of the vanes. The secondaries and inner primaries have pale yellow fringes on the outer web whereas the outer primaries have a white outer edge.

After the autumn moult, the tips of the new feathers have a buff fringe that adds a brown cast to the coloured plumage. The ends of the feathers wear away over the winter so that by the spring breeding season the underlying brighter colours are displayed. The eyes have dark brown irises and the legs are grey-brown. In winter the bill is a pale grey and slightly darker along the upper ridge or culmen, but in spring the bill becomes bluish-grey with a small black tip.

The male of the subspecies resident in the British Isles (F. c. gengleri) closely resembles the nominate subspecies, but has a slightly darker mantle and underparts.

The adult female is much duller in appearance than the male. The head and most of the upperparts are shades of grey-brown. The underparts are paler. The lower back and rump are a dull olive green. The wings and tail are similar to those of the male. The juvenile resembles the female.

=== Voice ===
Songs

Males typically sing two or three different song types, and there are regional dialects also.

The acquisition by the young Eurasian chaffinch of its song was the subject of an influential study by British ethologist William Thorpe. Thorpe determined that if the young common chaffinch is not exposed to the adult male's song during a certain critical period after hatching, it will never properly learn the song. He also found that in adult Eurasian chaffinches, castration eliminates the song, but injection of testosterone induces such birds to sing even in November, when they are normally silent.

Calls

Eurasian chaffinches use between two and eight calls. These calls may vary geographically and their role is not fully understood. Some are used by both sexes all along the year, such as the flight call (tupe) and the separation-alarm call (chink). By contrast, others are used solely in the breeding season. These include the seep female call and the male kseep and tchirp calls. Other calls may be used in when the chaffinches attack other bird near the nest (zzz) and when predators are around (seee and uh-weet calls). The uh-weet call is sometimes labeled rain call. However, the correlation of this call with rainy weather has been challenged by recent research. The uh-weet call correlates better with predator presence in vicinity of calling males, especially when females are around.

== Distribution and habitat ==
The Eurasian chaffinch breeds in wooded areas where the July isotherm is between 12 and 30 °C (54 and 86 °F). The breeding range includes most of Europe and extends eastwards across temperate Asia to the Angara River and the southern end of Lake Baikal in Siberia. The Eurasian chaffinch was introduced from Great Britain into several of its overseas territories in the second half of the 19th century. In New Zealand, the Eurasian chaffinch had colonised both the North and South Islands by 1900 and is now one of the most widespread and common passerine species. In South Africa, a very small breeding colony in the suburbs of Constantia, Hout Bay, Pinelands and Camps Bay in Cape Town is the only remnant of another such introduction.

This bird is not migratory in the milder parts of its range, but vacates the colder regions in winter. It forms loose flocks outside the breeding season, sometimes mixed with bramblings. It occasionally strays to eastern North America, although some sightings may be escapees.

== Behaviour ==
=== Breeding ===
Eurasian chaffinches first breed when they are one year old. They are mainly monogamous and the pair-bond for residential subspecies such as gengleri sometimes persists from one year to the next. The date for breeding is dependent on the spring temperature and is earlier in southwest Europe and later in the northeast. In Great Britain, most clutches are laid between late April and the middle of June. A male attracts a female to his territory through song.

Nests are built entirely by the female and are usually located in the fork of a bush or a tree several metres above the ground. The nest has a deep cup and is lined with a layer of thin roots and feathers. The outside is covered with a layer of lichen and spider silk over an inner layer of moss and grass. The eggs are laid in early morning at daily intervals until the clutch is complete. The clutch is typically 4–5 eggs, which are smooth and slightly glossy, but very variable in colour. They range from pale-blueish green to light red with purple-brown blotches, spots or steaks. The average size of an egg is 19 mm × 15 mm (0.75 in × 0.59 in) with a weight of 2.2 g (0.078 oz). The eggs are incubated for 10–16 days by the female. The chicks are altricial, hatching nearly naked with closed eyes, and are fed by both parents but mainly by the female, who broods them for around six days. They are mainly fed caterpillars. The nestlings fledge 11–18 days after hatching and disperse. The young birds are then assisted with feeding by both parents for a further three weeks. The parents only very rarely start a second brood, but when they do so it is always in a new nest. Juveniles undergo a partial moult at around five weeks of age in which they replace their head, body and many of their covert feathers, but not their primary and secondary flight feathers. After breeding adult birds undergo a complete annual moult which lasts around ten weeks.

In a study carried out in Britain using ring-recovery data, the survival rate for juveniles in their first year was 53 per cent, and the adult annual survival rate was 59 per cent. From these figures the typical lifespan is only 3 years, but the maximum age recorded is 15 years and 6 months for a bird in Switzerland.

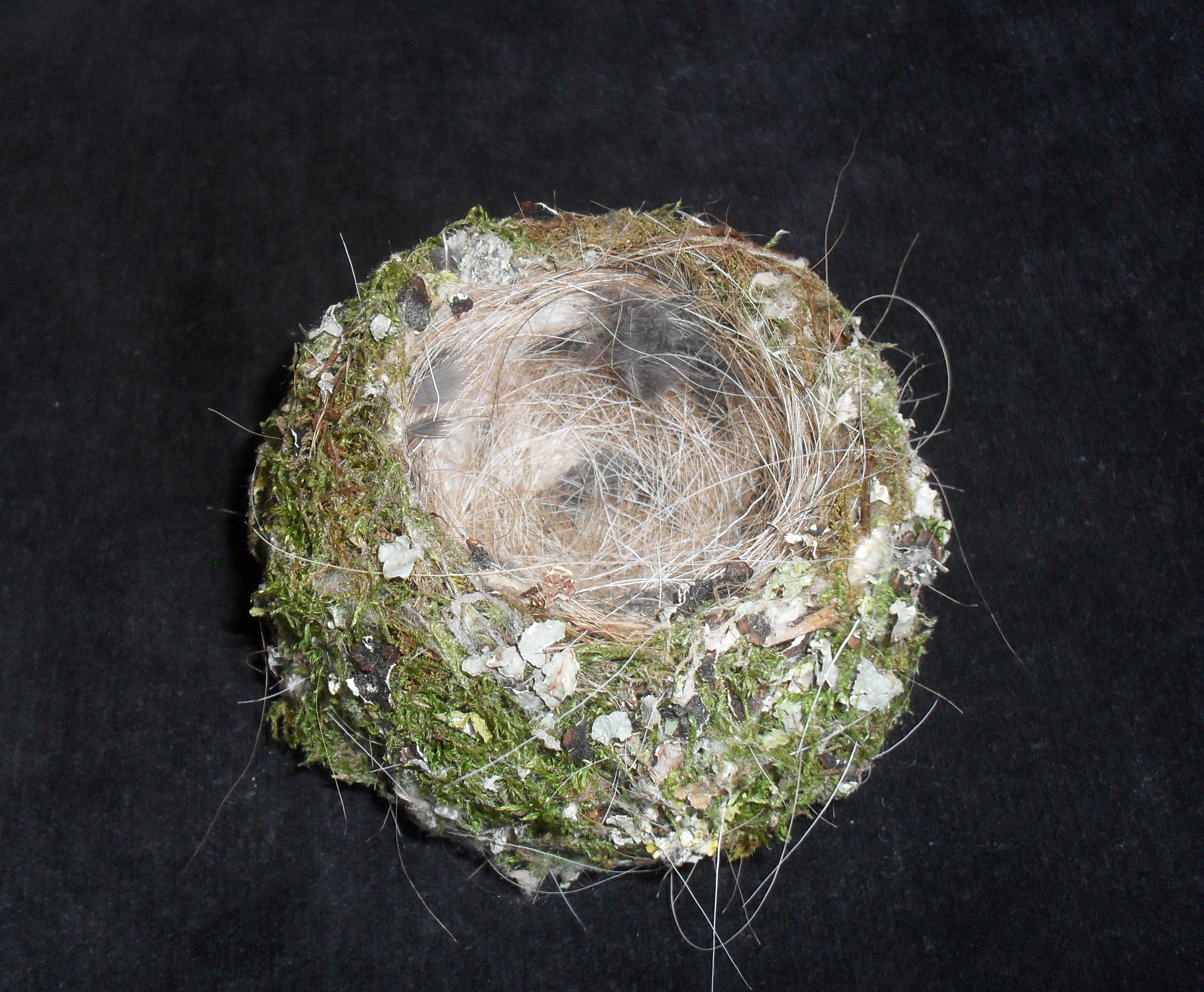
Nest of a chaffinch

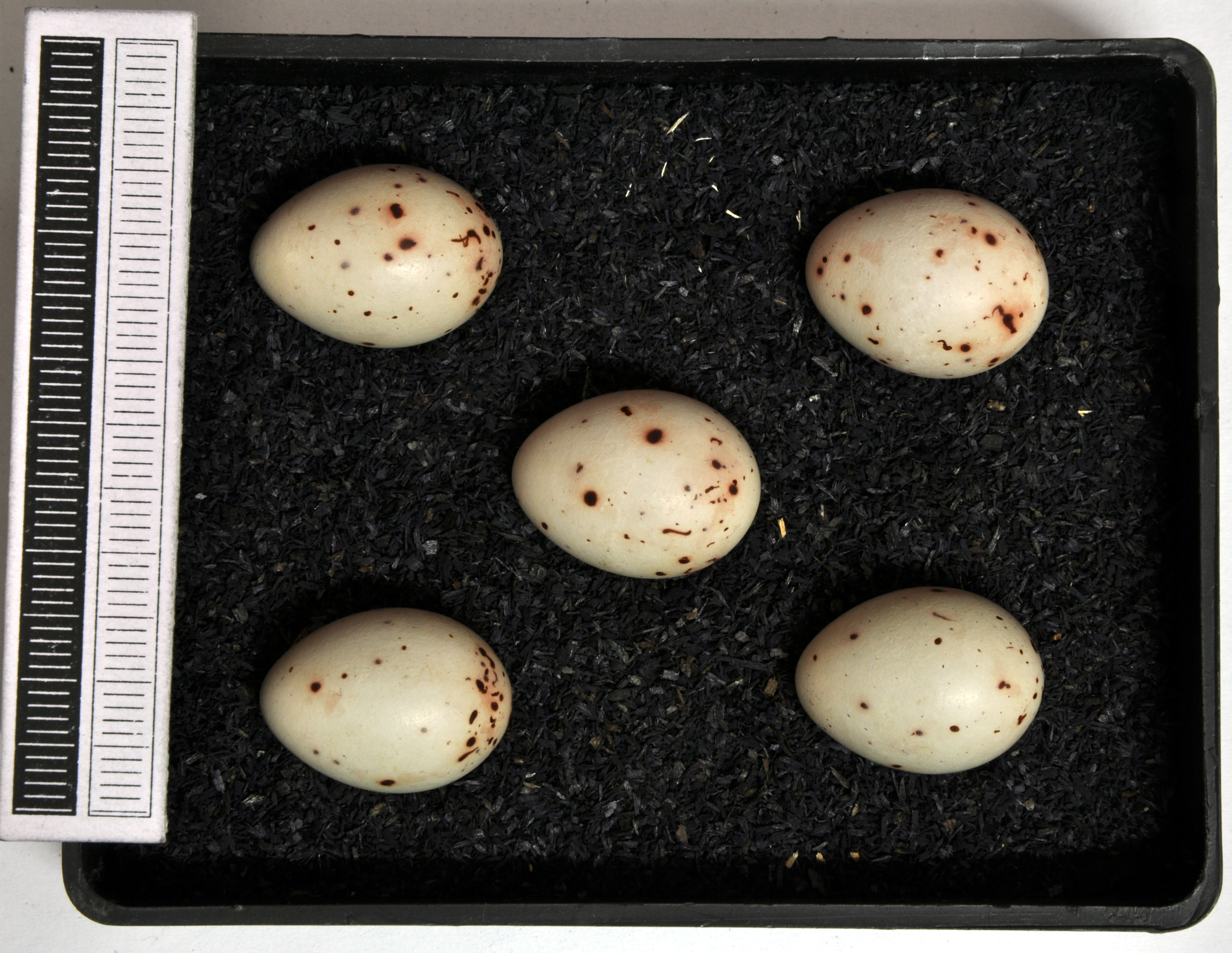
Eggs of Fringilla coelebs coelebs

=== Feeding ===
Outside the breeding season, Eurasian chaffinches mainly eat seeds and other plant material that they find on the ground. They often forage in open country in large flocks. Common chaffinches seldom take food directly from plants and only very rarely use their feet for handling food. During the breeding season, their diet switches to invertebrates, especially defoliating caterpillars. They forage in trees and also occasionally make short sallies to catch insects in the air. The young are entirely fed with invertebrates which include caterpillars, aphids, earwigs, spiders and grubs (the larvae of beetles).

== Predators and parasites ==
The eggs and nestlings of the Eurasian chaffinch are predated by crows, Eurasian red and eastern grey squirrels, domestic cats and probably also by stoats and weasels. Clutches begun later in the spring suffer less predation, an effect that is believed to be due to the increased vegetation making nests more difficult to find. Unlike the case for the closely related brambling, the common chaffinch is not parasitised by the common cuckoo.

The protozoal parasite Trichomonas gallinae was known to infect pigeons and raptors, but beginning in Great Britain in 2005, carcasses of dead European greenfinches and common chaffinches were found to be infected with the parasite. The disease spread and in 2008, infected carcasses were found in Norway, Sweden and Finland and a year later in Germany. The spread of the disease is believed to have been mediated by Eurasian chaffinches, as large numbers of the birds breed in northern Europe and winter in Great Britain. In Great Britain, the number of infected carcasses recovered each year declined after a peak in 2006. There was a reduction in the number of European greenfinches but no significant decline in the overall number of common chaffinches. A similar pattern occurred in Finland where, after the arrival of the disease in 2008, there was a reduction in the number of European greenfinches, but only a small change in the number of Eurasian chaffinches.

Eurasian chaffinches can develop tumors on their feet and legs caused by the Fringilla coelebs papillomavirus. The size of the papillomas range from a small nodule on a digit to a large growth involving both the foot and the leg. The disease is uncommon: in a 1973 study undertaken in the Netherlands, of around 25,000 common chaffinches screened, only 330 bore papillomas.

== Status ==
The Eurasian chaffinch has an extensive range, estimated at 7 million square kilometres (3.7 million square miles) and a large population including an estimated 130–240 million breeding pairs in Europe. Allowing for the birds breeding in Asia, the total population lies between 530 and 1,400 million individuals. There is no evidence of any serious overall decline in numbers, so the species is classified by the International Union for Conservation of Nature as being of Least Concern.

== Relationship to humans ==
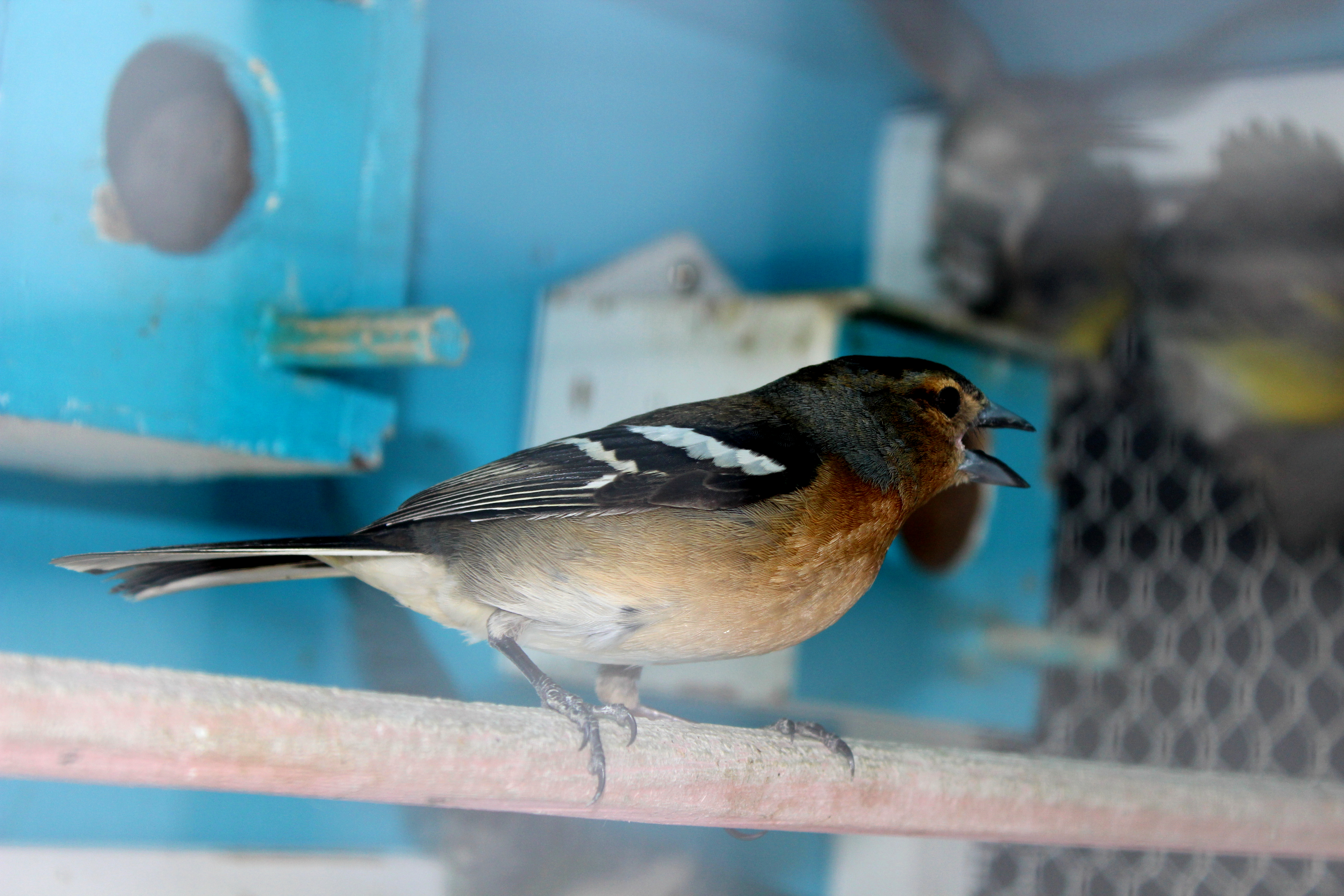
A captive male chaffinch

The Eurasian chaffinch was once popular as a caged songbird and large numbers of wild birds were trapped and sold. At the end of the 19th century, trapping even depleted the number of birds in London parks. In 1882, the English publisher Samuel Orchart Beeton issued a guide on the care of caged birds and included the recommendation: "To parents and guardians plagued with a morose and sulky boy, my advice is, buy him a chaffinch." Competitions were held where bets were placed on which caged common chaffinch would repeat its song the greatest number of times. The birds were sometimes blinded with a hot needle in the belief that this encouraged them to sing. This practice is the subject of the poem The Blinded Bird by the English author Thomas Hardy, which contrasts the cruelty involved in blinding the birds with their zestful song. In Great Britain, the practice of keeping Eurasian chaffinches as pets declined after the trapping of wild birds was outlawed by the Wild Birds Protection Acts of 1880 to 1896.

The Eurasian chaffinch is still a popular pet bird in some European countries. In Belgium, the traditional sport of vinkenzetting pits male Eurasian chaffinches against one another in a contest for the most bird calls in an hour.

== Sources ==
- Cramp, Stanley, ed. (1994). "Fringilla coelebs Chaffinch". Handbook of the Birds of Europe the Middle East and North Africa. The Birds of the Western Palearctic, Volume 8: Crows to Finches. Oxford: Oxford University Press. pp. 448–473. ISBN 978-0-19-854679-5.
- Newton, Ian (1972). Finches. The New Naturalist, Volume 55. London: Collins. ISBN 978-0-00-213065-3.
