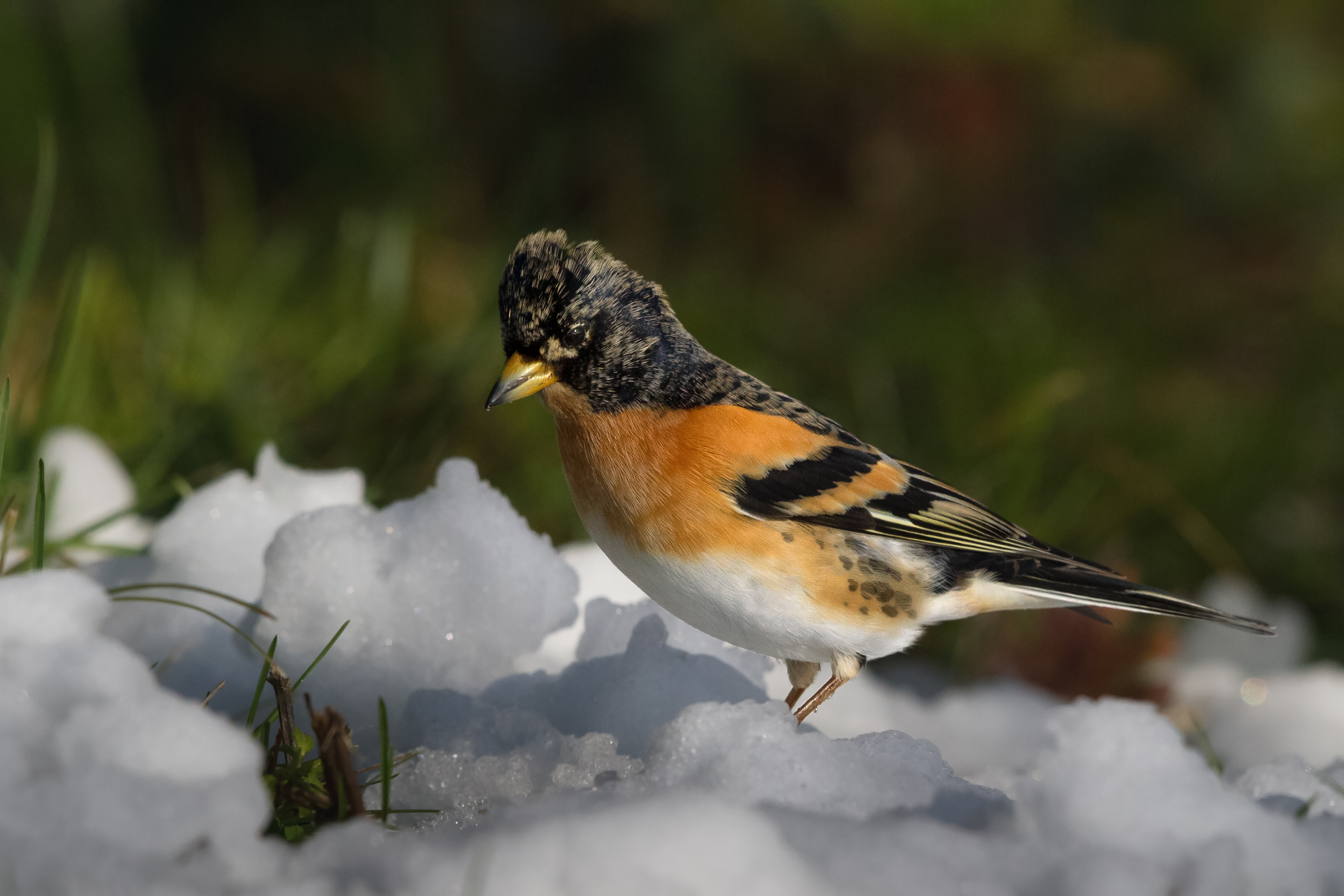
- Male in France
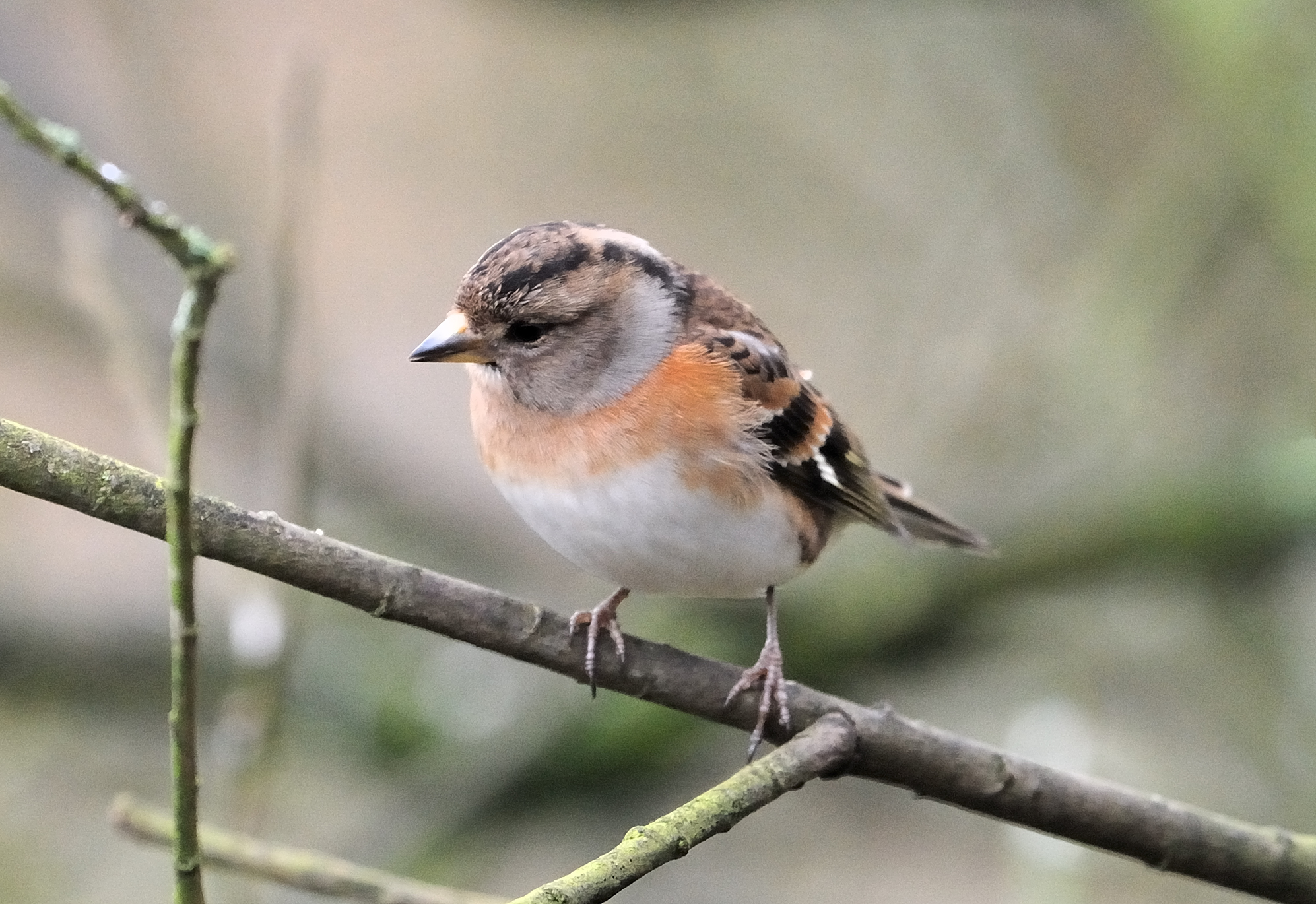
- Female in England

Conservation status
- Least Concern (IUCN 3.1)

Scientific classification
- Kingdom: Animalia
- Phylum: Chordata
- Class: Aves
- Order: Passeriformes
- Family: Fringillidae
- Genus: Fringilla
- Species: F. montifringilla

Binomial name
- Fringilla montifringilla Linnaeus, 1758
- Range of F. montifringilla Breeding Resident Non-breeding Vagrant (seasonality uncertain)

= Brambling =

Species of bird

Brambling's song

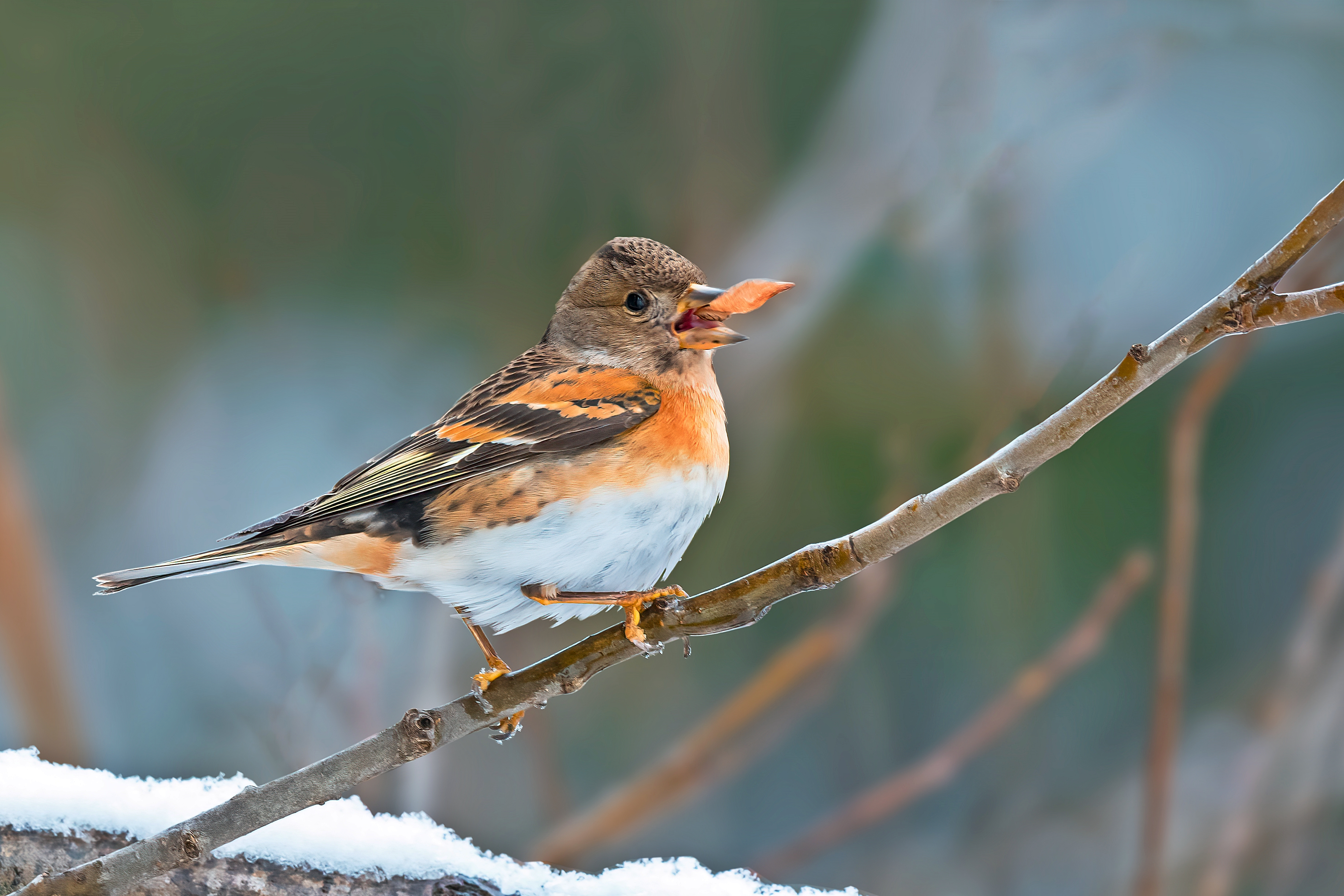
Brambling in Pahalgam, Anantnag, Jammu and Kashmir

The brambling (Fringilla montifringilla) is a small passerine bird in the finch family Fringillidae. It has also been called the cock o' the north and the mountain finch. It is widespread and migratory, often seen in very large flocks.

== Taxonomy ==
In 1758 Linnaeus included the species in the 10th edition of his Systema Naturae under its current binomial name, Fringilla montifringilla. Montifringilla is from Latin mons, montis mountain and fringilla finch. The English name "bramlyng" (Bram "loud" + lyng "lung") was used in 1544 by the English naturalist William Turner but later in the 16th century the current spelling "brambling" was used. The etymology of the name is uncertain as the bird is not associated with the bramble or common blackberry Rubus fruticosus.

== Description ==
The brambling is similar in size and shape to a common chaffinch. Breeding-plumaged male bramblings are very distinctive, with a black head, dark upperparts, orange breast and white belly. Females and younger birds are less distinct, and more similar in appearance to some chaffinches. In all plumages, however, bramblings differs from chaffinches in a number of features:

- the brambling has a white rump, whereas that of the common chaffinch is grey-green;
- the breast is orange, contrasting with a white belly, on the brambling, whereas on the common chaffinch, the underparts are more uniformly coloured (pink or buff);
- the brambling's scapular feathers are orange, whereas the common chaffinch's are grey or grey-brown;
- the flanks are dark-spotted on the brambling, plain on the common chaffinch;
- bramblings lack the white outer tail feathers of common chaffinches.

An additional difference for all plumages except breeding-plumaged males is the bill colour - yellow in the brambling, dull pinkish in the common chaffinch (breeding-plumaged male bramblings have black bills, common chaffinches in the corresponding plumage have grey bills).

Measurements:

- Length: 16 cm
- Weight: 23–29 g
- Wingspan: 25–26 cm

== Distribution and habitat ==
This bird is widespread, in the breeding season, throughout the forests of northern Europe and east across the Palearctic. It is migratory, wintering in southern Europe, North Africa, northern India, northern Pakistan, China, and Japan. It frequently strays into Alaska during migration and there are scattered records across the northern United States and southern Canada. The global population of bramblings is about 100 to 200 million, with a decreasing trend.

Open coniferous or birch woodland is favoured for breeding.

=== Migration ===
This species is almost entirely migratory. In Europe, it forms large flocks in the winter, sometimes with thousands or even millions of birds in a single flock. Such large gatherings occur especially if beech mast is abundant. Bramblings do not require beech mast in the winter, but winter flocks of bramblings will move until they find it. This may be an adaptation to avoid competition with the common chaffinch.

== Behaviour ==
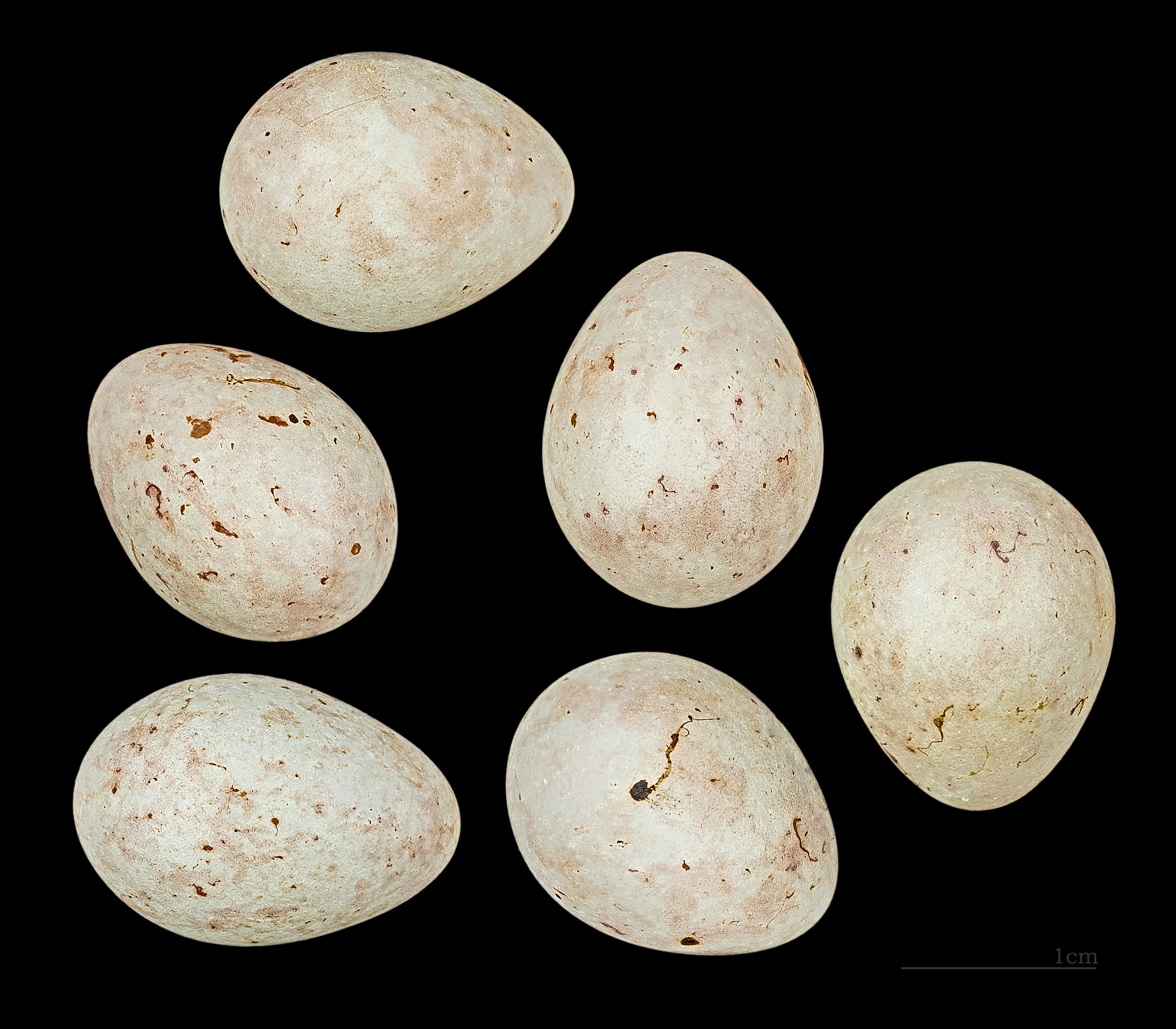
Eggs, Muséum de Toulouse

=== Breeding ===
Bramblings first breed when they are one year old. The nest is usually placed high in a tree against the trunk. It is built by the female and consists of an outer layer which may contain lichen, grass, heather, cobwebs and strips of bark from birch or juniper trees. It is lined with feathers, soft grass and hair. The eggs are laid at daily intervals. The clutch usually contains 5–7 eggs. They range from light blue to dark olive-brown and have pink to rusty red spots and blotches. On average they measure 19.4 mm × 14.5 mm (0.76 in × 0.57 in) and have a calculated weight of 2.14 g (0.075 oz). Starting after the last egg has been laid, they are incubated by the female and hatch after 11–12 days. The young are fed and cared for by both parents and fledge after 13–14 days. Often only one brood is raised each year but two broods can be raised in northwest Russia.

The nests can be predated by the carrion crow (Corvus corone) and the Siberian jay (Perisoreus infaustus). The nest are often parasitized by the common cuckoo (Cuculus canorus).

=== Food and feeding ===
Bramblings mostly eat seeds in winter, but insects in summer.

== Sources ==
- Cramp, Stanley; et al., eds. (1994). "Fringilla montifringilla Brambling". Handbook of the Birds of Europe the Middle East and North Africa. The Birds of the Western Palearctic. Vol. 8: Crows to Finches. Oxford: Oxford University Press. pp. 479–497. ISBN 978-0-19-854679-5.
