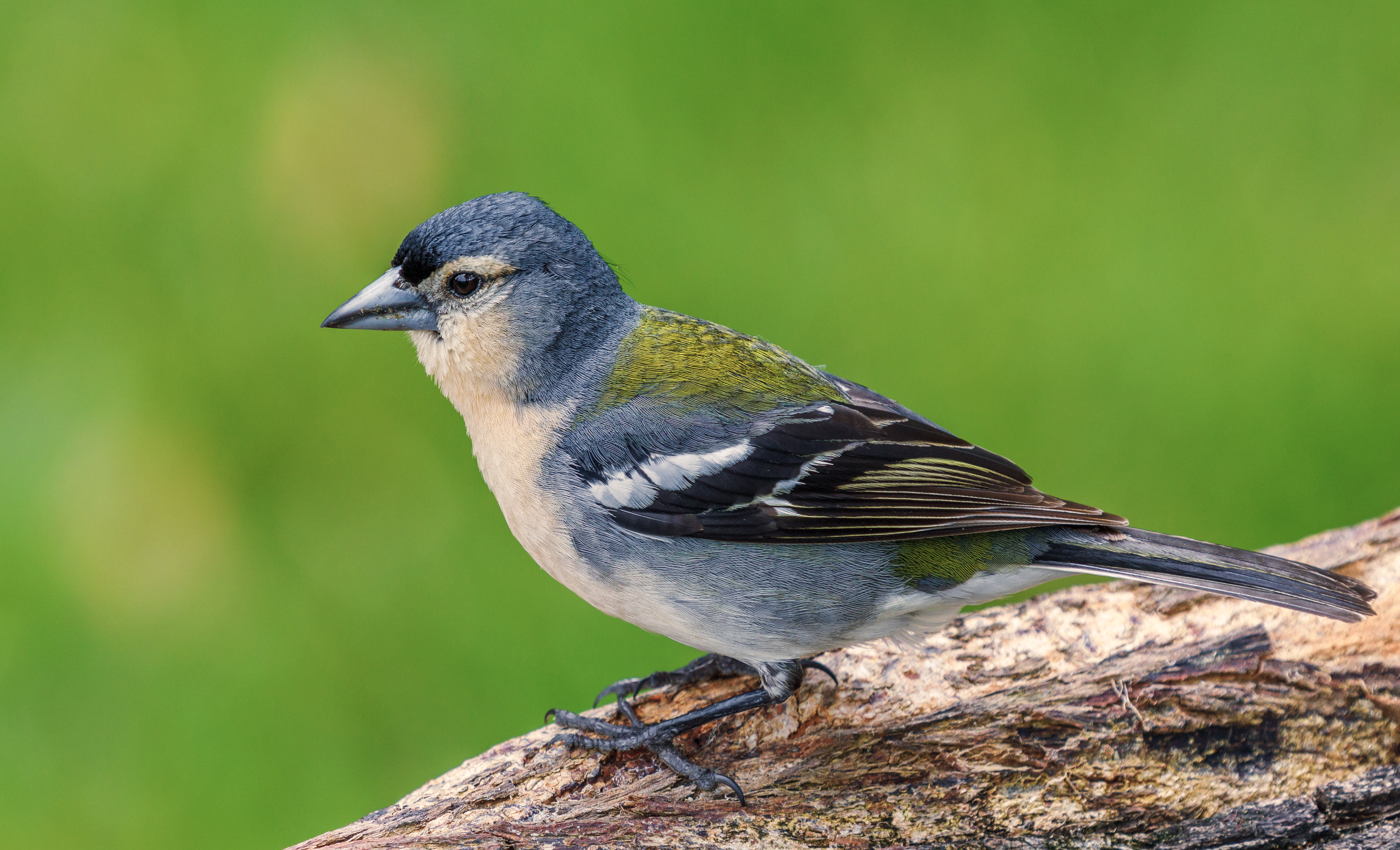
- Male

Scientific classification
- Kingdom: Animalia
- Phylum: Chordata
- Class: Aves
- Order: Passeriformes
- Family: Fringillidae
- Genus: Fringilla
- Species: F. moreletti

Binomial name
- Fringilla moreletti Pucheran, 1859

Synonyms
- Fringilla coelebs moreletti

= Azores chaffinch =

Species of finch

The Azores chaffinch (Fringilla moreletti) is a small passerine bird in the finch family Fringillidae, closely related to the Eurasian chaffinch F. coelebs, and formerly treated as a subspecies of it. Genetic, morphological, and vocal differences from it have resulted in it being elevated to species level in 2021. It is endemic to the Portuguese archipelago of the Azores, part of Macaronesia in the warm temperate northern Atlantic Ocean. It is locally known as the tentilhão or sachão.

== Description ==
The top and rear of the head and part of the mantle are bluish-grey, with the rest of the mantle being greenish; the wings and tail are black and white; the throat, cheeks, and chest are pink. Unlike other chaffinches, it often shows a pale supercilium above and behind the eye. The bill is grey with a dark tip and cutting edges. The legs and feet are dark pinkish-brown. The plumage of the females is duller, brown above and paler brown below, and with narrower white wing and tail markings. It also differs from the Eurasian Chaffinch in its longer, stouter bill, in this character reminiscent of the Tenerife blue chaffinch.

== Distribution and habitat ==
The Azores chaffinch inhabits all of the Azores and is one the most common birds in the archipelago; it can be seen from sea level to the mountainous interior, including the highest areas of Pico.
