= John Pollatschek =

Scottish footballer and manager

Personal information
- Full name: Jean Louis Pollatschek
- Date of birth: 1 August 1943 (age 83)
- Place of birth: Camlachie, Scotland
- Position: Left back

Youth career
- Holyrood School

Senior career*
| Years | Team | Apps | (Gls) |
| 1961–1967 | Queen's Park | 71 | (1) |
| 1967 | Partick Thistle | 0 | (0) |
| 1967 | East Fife | 0 | (0) |
| 1968–1969 | Hamilton Academical | 14 | (0) |

International career
| 1963–1965 | Scotland Amateurs | 12 | (0) |

Managerial career
- –1976: Glasgow University
- 1979–1985: Scotland Women
- * Club domestic league appearances and goals

Jean Louis Pollatschek (born 1 August 1943) is a Scottish former footballer and manager who played as a left back in the Scottish League for Queen's Park and Hamilton Academical. He was capped by Scotland at amateur level and after his retirement, he became a manager and coach. Pollatschek managed the Glasgow University team, which reached the second round of the 1975–76 Scottish Cup and later served as manager of Scotland Women. He also coached at Clydebank and former club Hamilton Academical.

== Personal life ==
Pollatschek attended Holyrood School in Glasgow. Between 1976 and 1990, Pollatschek lectured at the Scottish School of Physical Education. He took up a position at the International School of Geneva in 1990 and retired in 2008. As of 2016, Pollatschek was living in Switzerland.

== Career statistics ==
Appearances and goals by club, season and competition
| Club | Season | League | | | Scottish Cup | | League Cup | | Other | | Total | |
| Club | Season | Division | Apps | Goals | Apps | Goals | Apps | Goals | Apps | Goals | Apps | Goals |
|---|---|---|---|---|---|---|---|---|---|---|---|---|
| Queen's Park | 1962–63 | Scottish Second Division | 6 | 0 | 2 | 0 | 0 | 0 | 1 (Note: Appearances in Glasgow Cup) | 0 | 7 | 0 |
| Queen's Park | 1963–64 | Scottish Second Division | 21 | 0 | 2 | 0 | 0 | 0 | 1 | 0 | 24 | 0 |
| Queen's Park | 1964–65 | Scottish Second Division | 30 | 0 | 6 | 0 | 3 | 0 | 2 | 0 | 41 | 0 |
| Queen's Park | 1965–66 | Scottish Second Division | 9 | 1 | 0 | 0 | 4 | 0 | 0 | 0 | 13 | 1 |
| Queen's Park | 1966–67 | Scottish Second Division | 5 | 0 | 0 | 0 | 0 | 0 | 0 | 0 | 5 | 0 |
| Queen's Park | Total | | 71 | 1 | 10 | 0 | 7 | 0 | 4 | 0 | 92 | 1 |
| Hamilton Academical | 1968–69 | Scottish Second Division | 14 | 0 | 1 | 0 | 4 | 0 | 1 (Note: Appearance in Lanarkshire Cup) | 0 | 20 | 0 |
| Career total | | | 85 | 1 | 11 | 0 | 11 | 0 | 5 | 0 | 112 | 1 |

== Honours ==
Scotland Amateurs

- FA Centenary Amateur International Tournament
