= Veronika Poláčková =

Czech actress (born 1982)

Veronika Poláčková (sometimes as Veronika Poláček) is a Czech actress.

== Biography ==
She was born 28 August 1982 in Prague.

== Education ==
After graduating from the Janáček Academy of Music and Performing Arts (JAMU) in Brno in 2004 she completed her doctoral program in Dramaturgy in 2012. Since 2006 Poláčková works as guest lecturer and pedagogical adviser at the JAMU in Brno.

== Professional career ==
- 2004 – 2009 actress at the Brno City Theatre
- 2009 – 2013 presenter and editor at the local Brno TV station ("BRNĚNSKÁ TELEVIZE")
- 2012–present actress at the "Malého divadla komedie " "

== Movies and TV shows (selection) ==
- 2014 Poslední z Aporveru
- 2013 Pionýři hororu (TV show)
- 2012 Tady hlídám já (movie)
- 2010 Cesty domů (TV show)
- 2009 Dům U Zlatého úsvitu (TV movie)
- 2003 Janek nad Janky (TV movie)

== Theatre ==
=== City Theatre, Brno ===
- Slaměný klobouk .... Helena
- The Chioggia Scuffles .... Orsetta
- Death of Paul I .... Mrs. Volkova
- Peklo .... Shade
- Three Musketeers .... Nun/Maid of honour/Aunt
- Twelfth Night, or What You Will .... Valentin
- Henry VIII .... Anne Boleyn
- Máj .... Hanka
- Arcadia ... Thomasina Coverly
- Romance for Bugle .... Village Woman
- Maškaráda .... niece
- Ginger and Fred .... Cover Girl in TV Commercial
- Labyrint světa a ráj srdce .... 1st picture
- Jak je důležité míti Filipa .... Gwendoline Fairfax
- Odysseia .... Aphrodite
- Ferdinand, kd´Este? .... ensemble
- Kdyby tisíc klarinetů .... girl from boarding school
- Oliver! .... Off-stage
- Zahrada divů .... Skřet
