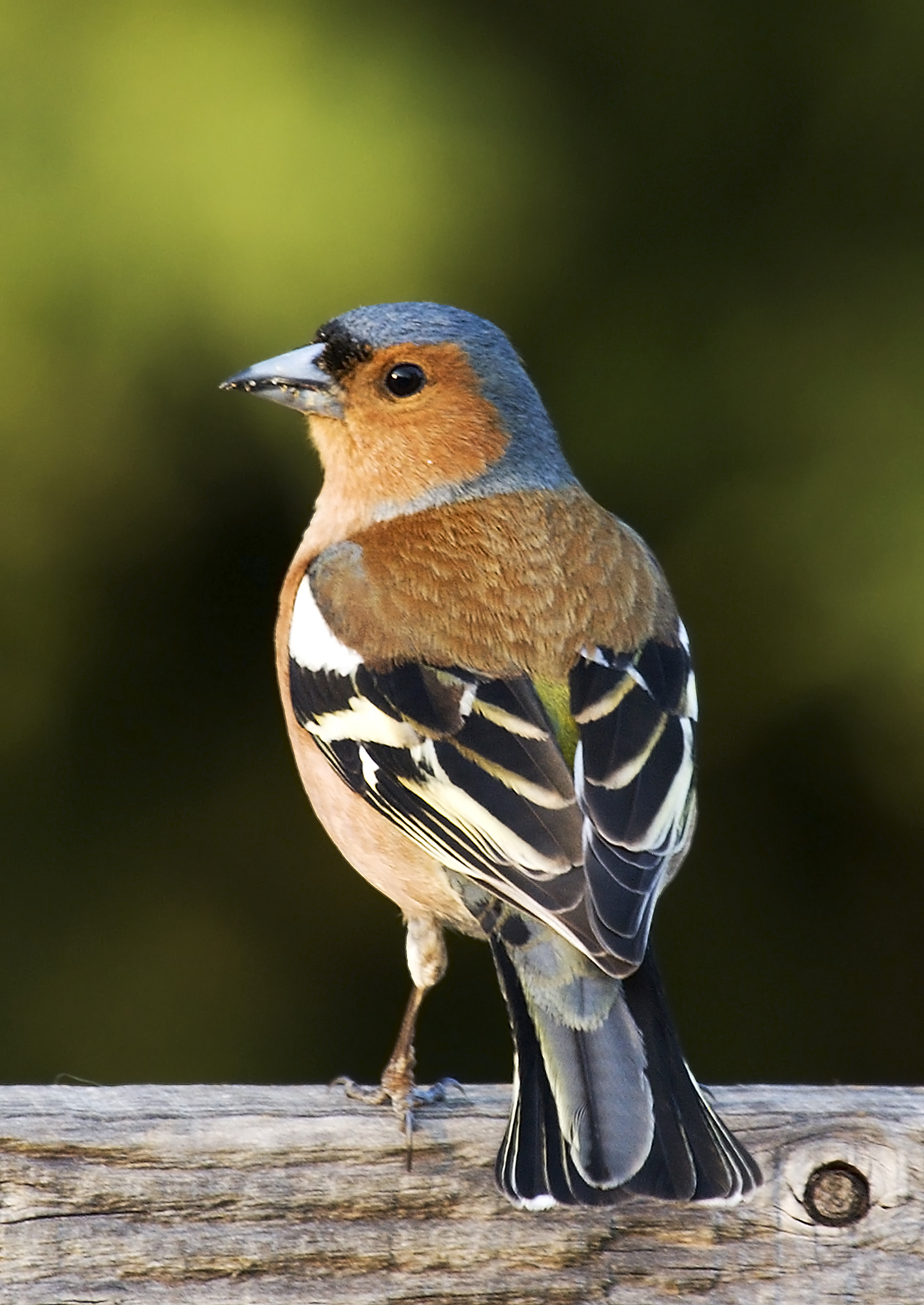
- Male Eurasian chaffinch

Scientific classification
- Kingdom: Animalia
- Phylum: Chordata
- Class: Aves
- Order: Passeriformes
- Family: Fringillidae
- Subfamily: Fringillinae; Leach, 1820
- Genus: Fringilla; Linnaeus, 1758

Type species
- Fringilla coelebs Linnaeus, 1758

Species
- Fringilla coelebs; Fringilla spodiogenys; Fringilla moreletti; Fringilla maderensis; Fringilla canariensis; Fringilla polatzeki; Fringilla teydea; Fringilla montifringilla

= Fringilla =

Genus of birds

The genus Fringilla, also known as chaffinches, is a small group of eight species of finches from the Old World. It is the only genus in the subfamily Fringillinae.

== Taxonomy ==
The genus Fringilla was described in 1758 by the Swedish naturalist Carl Linnaeus in the tenth edition of his Systema Naturae. The genus name Fringilla is Latin for "finch". Linnaeus included 30 species in the genus (Fringilla zena was listed twice) and of these the Eurasian chaffinch (Fringilla coelebs) is considered as the type species.

=== Species ===
By the early 20th century, the genus was considered to include just three species, with the other species included by Linnaeus transferred to other genera. In 2016, it was proposed that the extremely rare Gran Canaria blue chaffinch subspecies F. teydea polatzeki be treated as a separate species, thus accepting a fourth species, F. polatzeki.

A major genetic, morphological, and behavioural study in 2021 then divided the former common chaffinch (Fringilla coelebs sensu lato) into five species, so the genus is now accepted as containing eight species:

Image	Scientific name	Common name	Distribution
	Fringilla coelebs	Eurasian chaffinch	Europe, across Asia to western Siberia; migrating south in winter to north Africa and northern India
	Fringilla spodiogenys	African chaffinch	Northwestern Africa; nonmigratory
	Fringilla moreletti	Azores chaffinch	Azores; nonmigratory
	Fringilla maderensis	Madeira chaffinch	Madeira; nonmigratory
	Fringilla canariensis	Canary Islands chaffinch	Canary Islands; nonmigratory
	Fringilla polatzeki	Gran Canaria blue chaffinch	Gran Canaria in the Canary Islands; nonmigratory
	Fringilla teydea	Tenerife blue chaffinch	Tenerife in the Canary Islands; nonmigratory
	Fringilla montifringilla	Brambling	Northeastern Europe and northern Asia, migrating west and south in winter to western Europe, north Africa, northern India, northern Pakistan, China, and Japan

The Eurasian chaffinch is found primarily in forest habitats, in Europe and western Asia; the other species formerly treated as subspecies of it occur in North Africa and Macaronesia; the blue chaffinches are island endemics; and the brambling breeds in the northern taiga and southern tundra of Eurasia.

The eight species are all broadly similar size, 14–18 centimetres (5.5–7.1 in) in length, with brambling the smallest, and Tenerife blue chaffinch the largest; they are all similar in shape. They have a bouncing flight with alternating bouts of flapping and gliding on closed wings. They are not as specialised as other finches, eating both insects and seeds. While breeding, they feed their young on insects rather than seeds, unlike other finches.
