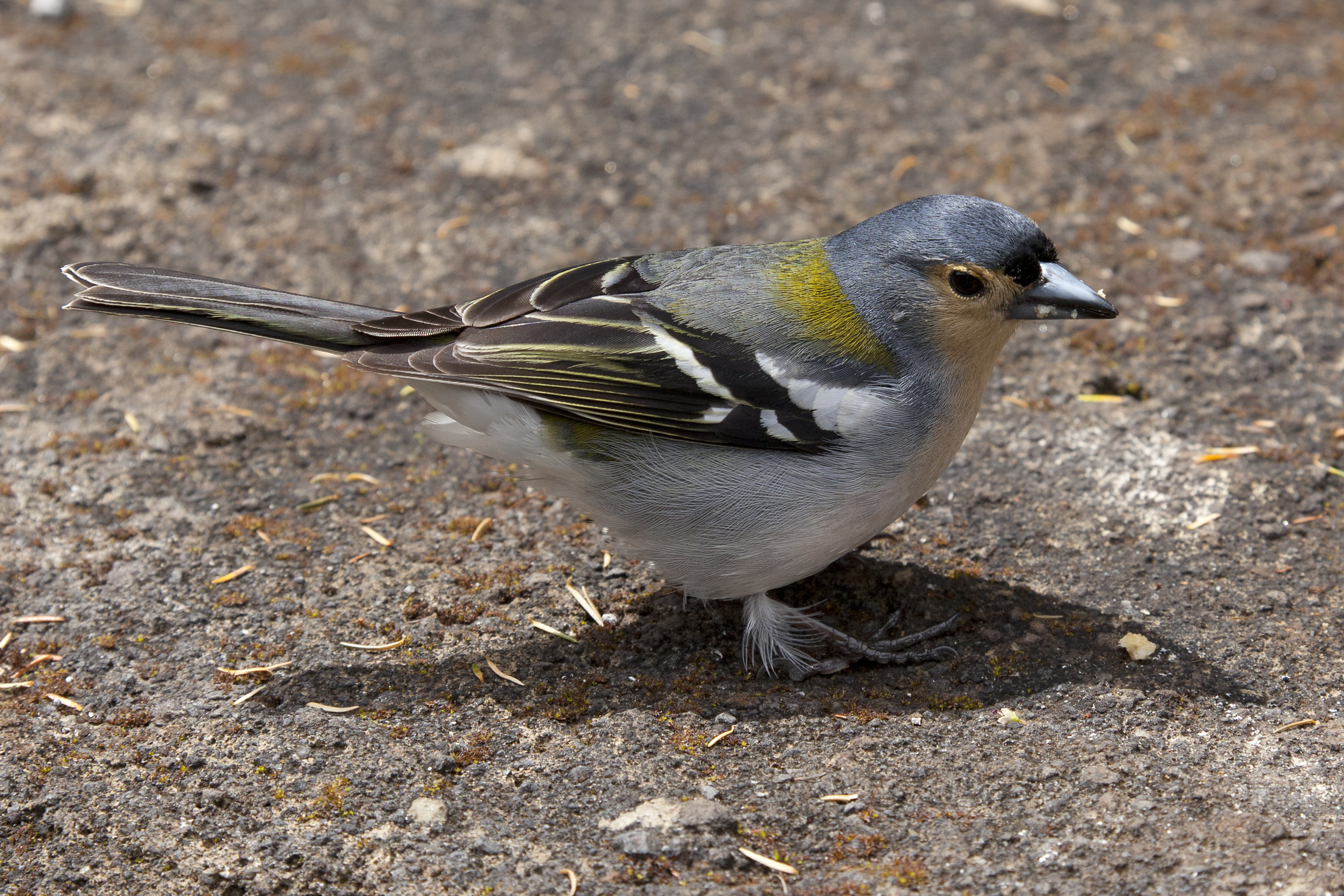
- Male
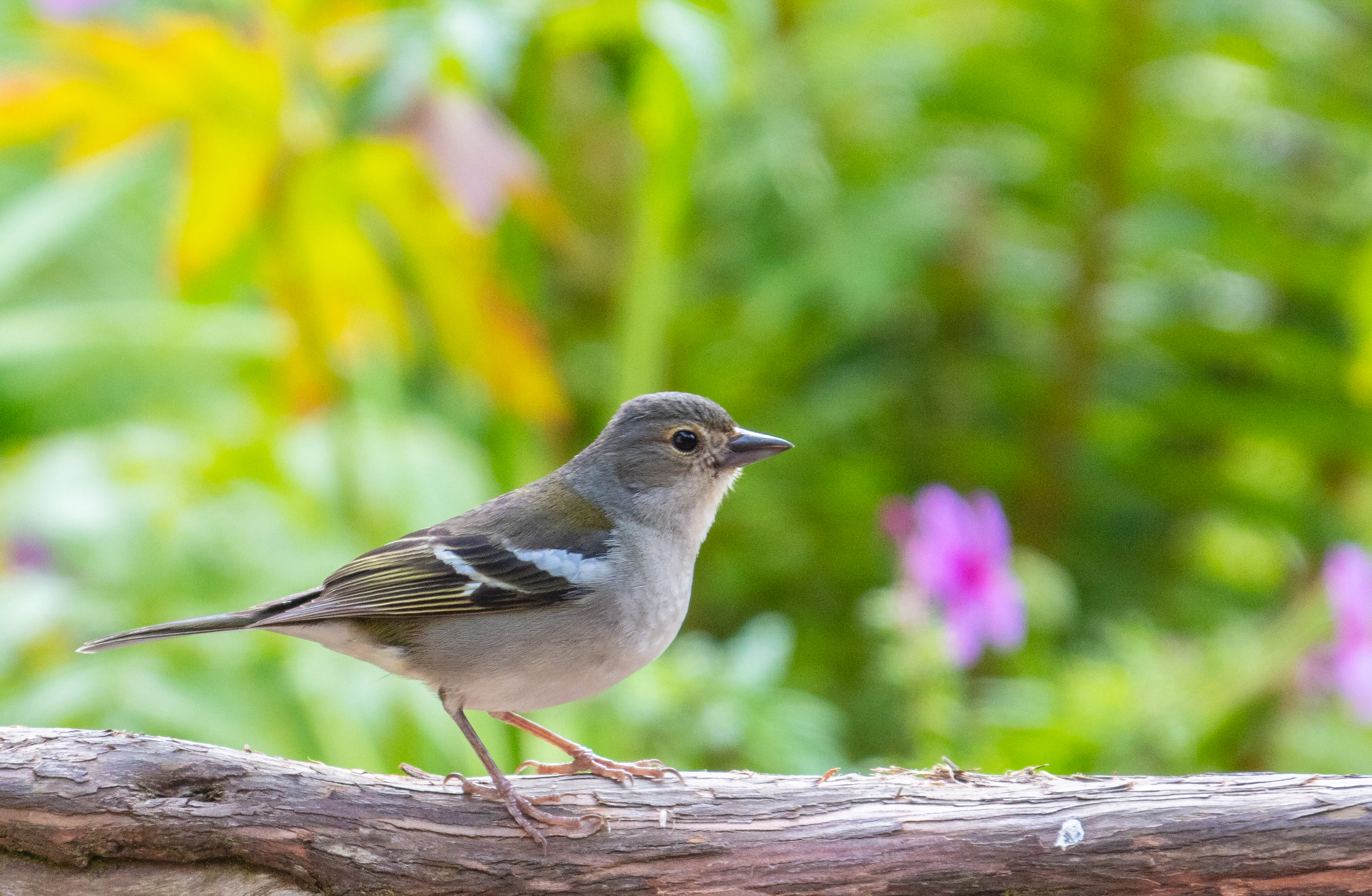
- Female

Scientific classification
- Kingdom: Animalia
- Phylum: Chordata
- Class: Aves
- Order: Passeriformes
- Family: Fringillidae
- Genus: Fringilla
- Species: F. maderensis

Binomial name
- Fringilla maderensis Sharpe, 1888

Synonyms
- Fringilla coelebs maderensis; Fringilla tintillon madeirensis Koenig, 1890

= Madeira chaffinch =

Species of finch

The Madeira chaffinch (Fringilla maderensis) is a small passerine bird in the finch family Fringillidae. It was formerly treated as a subspecies of the Eurasian chaffinch, but was recently revised to be a species in its own right, following a genetic and morphological analysis of the genus Fringilla in 2021. It is endemic to the Portuguese island of Madeira, part of Macaronesia in the North Atlantic Ocean. It is locally known as the tentilhão.

== Description ==
The male is more brightly coloured than the female. It has a pinkish breast, bluish-grey cap and greenish-brown back. The female's colouring is more subdued with a cream breast and brownish back, but both sexes have prominent white wing-bars and tail-sides. The length is 14.5–16 cm (5.7–6.3 in).

== Distribution and habitat ==
The chaffinch is found only on the island of Madeira, being absent from other islands in the Madeira archipelago. It is widespread through the hills of the island, occupying both the native laurisilva forest and plantations of introduced trees, as well as in areas of heath, farmland and shrubland.

== Behaviour ==
=== Breeding ===
The Madeira chaffinch nests between April and July. The female builds a cup-shaped nest lined with feathers in which she lays a clutch of four or five eggs and which she alone incubates for 12–15 days before they hatch. The male helps to feed the chicks.
