= Polaczek =

Polaczek and Pollaczek are surnames.

== Polaczek ==
- Aleksander Polaczek, Polish born former professional ice hockey player
- Dietmar Polaczek (1942–2020), Austrian writer, composer and journalist
- Ernst Polaczek (1870–1939), Austrian art historian and museum director in Görlitz from 1928 to 1933
- Jerzy Polaczek (born 1961), Polish politician

== Pollaczek ==
- Clara Katharina Pollaczek
- Félix Pollaczek

== See also ==
- Poláček
