= The Blinded Bird =

1916 poem by Thomas Hardy

"The Blinded Bird" is a 1916 poem written by English author and poet Thomas Hardy.

The poem was reportedly written as a protest against Vinkensport, a sort of singing competition between male finches. The poem decries the prior historical practice of blinding birds to improve their performance at the sport. For its last stanza Hardy borrows from the New Testament using themes found in 1 Cor. 13: 1-8.

== Text ==
So zestfully canst thou sing?
And all this indignity,
With God's consent, on thee!
Blinded ere yet a-wing
By the red-hot needle thou,
I stand and wonder how
So zestfully thou canst sing!

Resenting not such wrong,
Thy grievous pain forgot,
Eternal dark thy lot,
Groping thy whole life long;
After that stab of fire;
Enjailed in pitiless wire;
Resenting not such wrong!

Who hath charity? This bird.
Who suffereth long and is kind,
Is not provoked, though blind
And alive ensepulchred?
Who hopeth, endureth all things?
Who thinketh no evil, but sings?
Who is divine? This bird.
