= Johann Polatzek =

Johann Polatzek (1838 – 17 February 1927) was an Austrian army captain and collector of natural history specimens. He collected birds and insects from the Canary Islands and the Gran Canary finch (Fringilla polatzeki) was described from his collections by Ernst Hartert.

Polatzek served in the 3rd company of the k. u. k. Feldjägerbataillons Nr. 26 and saw action in the Balkans in 1882. From 1894 to 1900 he travelled in the Balkans, collecting specimens of natural history in his spare time. From 1902 to 1905 he visited the Canary Islands in 1910 he visited Pityusic. About 1500 bird specimens that he collected are held at the Natural History Museum in Vienna. He also sold specimens to Walter Rothschild and about 346 skins were obtained by D. A. Bannerman and are now held at the Natural History Museum at Tring. Species and subspecies named from his collections include:

- Phylloscopus canariensis exsul
- Calandrella rufescens polatzeki
- Fringilla polatzeki
- Fringilla teydea
- Buteo buteo lanzaroteae

He also collected insect specimens.
