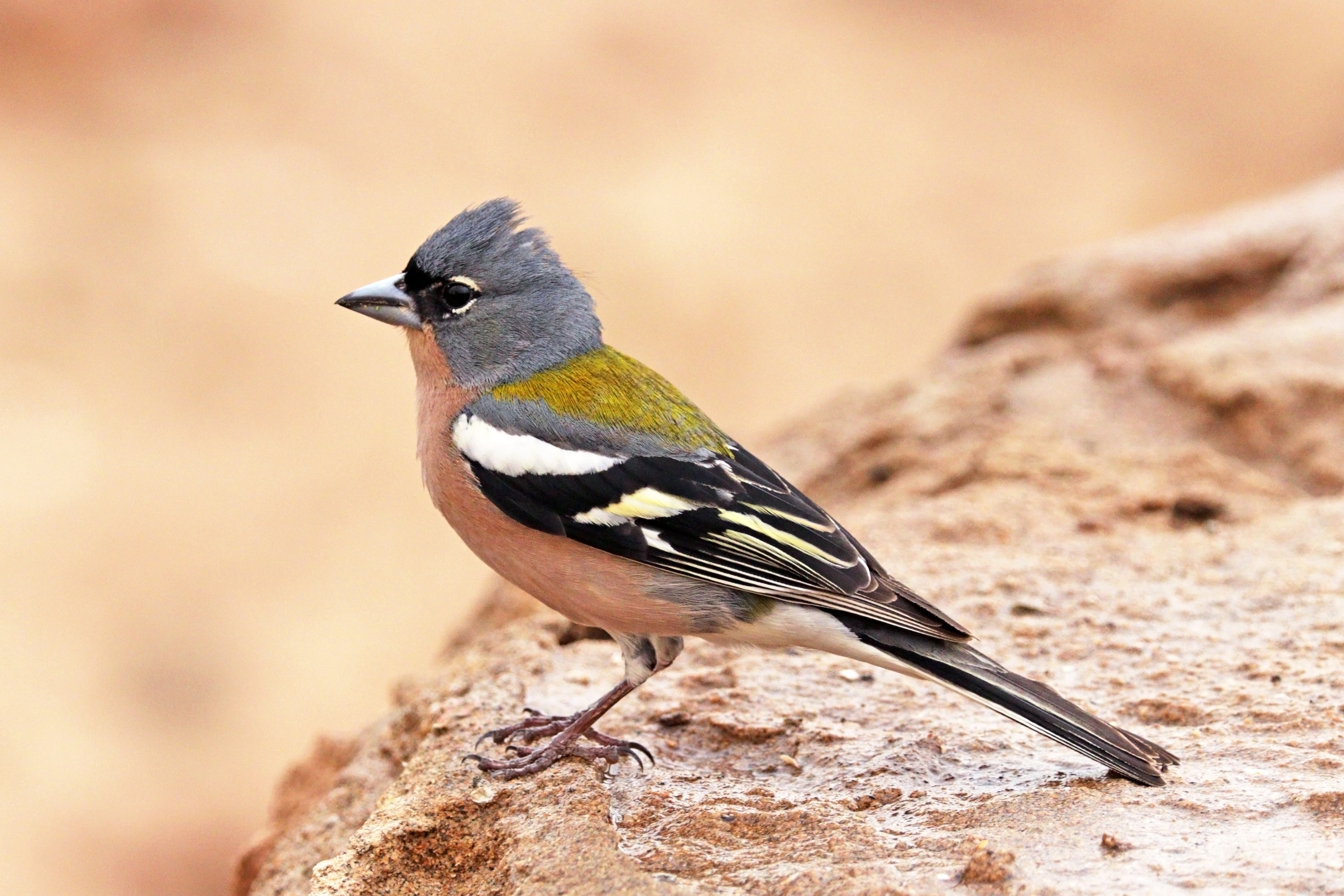
- Male, Morocco
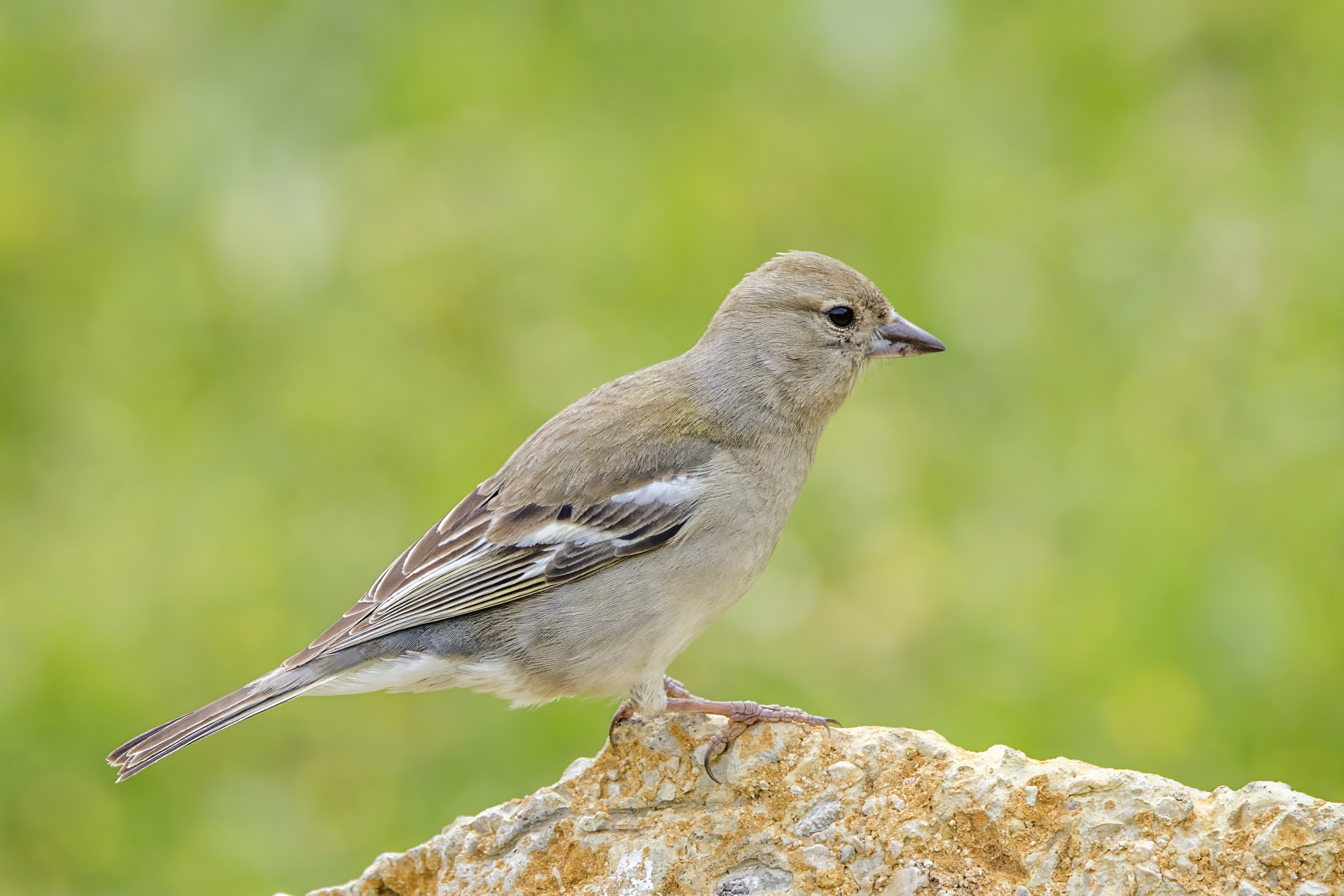
- Female, Tunisia

Scientific classification
- Kingdom: Animalia
- Phylum: Chordata
- Class: Aves
- Order: Passeriformes
- Family: Fringillidae
- Genus: Fringilla
- Species: F. spodiogenys

Binomial name
- Fringilla spodiogenys Bonaparte, 1841

Synonyms
- Fringilla coelebs spodiogenys

= African chaffinch =

Species of bird

The African chaffinch (Fringilla spodiogenys) is a species of passerine bird in the genus Fringilla. The African chaffinch is found from southern Morocco to northwestern Libya, and in Italy on the islands of Lampedusa and Pantelleria, off the Tunisian coast in the Strait of Sicily region; there is also an isolated population in northeastern Libya. It was formerly considered as two African subspecies of the Common chaffinch (Fringilla coelebs). Its habitat includes deciduous forests and lowlands, and during the nonbreeding season extends its habitat to open areas including weedy fields and olive groves.

The diet of the African chaffinch is similar to the Eurasian chaffinch, mostly eating small invertebrates and their larvae, as well as many flowers, seeds, and buds.

== Taxonomy ==
This species was first described by Napoleon Bonaparte's nephew, Charles Lucien Jules Laurent Bonaparte, who was an ornithologist. It was first classified as a species in its own right, but was soon reclassified as a subspecies of Eurasian chaffinch (Fringilla coelebs); work done between 1979 and 2021 found additional differences between the two, including genetics and vocal behaviour, that lead to the African chaffinch being restored to species status.

Three subspecies are accepted:

- Fringilla spodiogenys africana Levaillant, 1850 – Morocco to northwest Tunisia
- Fringilla spodiogenys spodiogenys Bonaparte, 1841 – eastern Tunisia, northwest Libya
- Fringilla spodiogenys harterti Svensson, 2015 – the Jebel Akhdar in Cyrenaica, northeastern Libya

== Distribution and habitat ==
The African chaffinch is found from southern Morocco to northwestern Libya, and in Italy on the islands of Lampedusa and Pantelleria, off the Tunisian coast in the Strait of Sicily; there is also an isolated population in northeastern Libya. The species is non-migratory and usually disperses only over short distances. The African chaffinch typically occurs in deciduous forests and Lowlands comprising a mix of trees such as maple (Acer), hornbeam (Carpinus), oak (Quercus), and pine (Pinus), alongside forest edges and clearings. In the Moroccan High Atlas it is found in Juniperus thurifera woods. During the non-breeding season, it extends its range to similar habitats and open agricultural areas, including weedy fields, stubble fields, olive groves, palm groves, and desert oases.

There are a few accepted records of vagrant African chaffinches in northern Europe, in Sweden on 5 April 1998 and 5 May 2003, in Norway on 13 April 1998 and 12 April 2002, in the Netherlands on 4–5 April 2003, and in France on 19 April 2003. Two other reports, from England in 1994–1995 and the Netherlands in 1999, have not been accepted by the relevant national bird records committees.

== Field identification ==
The African chaffinch is a medium to large finch that is typically 13.8–18.5 cm (5.4–7.3 in) in length and weighs 21–24 g (0.74–0.85 oz). Males and females have different characteristics. The adult male has a blue-grey head with a small patch of black above the bill on the forehead, and a moss-green mantle (the mantle very distinct from the reddish-brown of Eurasian chaffinch, and also lacking the reddish cheeks of that species); its wings are black with two bold white stripes and white edges to the tertials and secondaries; the tail is blue-grey with white sides. The male's throat, breast, and belly are pale pinkish, grading to white on the lower belly and undertail. The legs dark pinkish-brown, and the bill is silvery blue-grey with a black tip. In winter, the males are duller in plumage, with the head more grey-brown and the mantle more brownish-green. Females and juveniles are greyish brown; they have dark brown and white stripes on the wings and a lighter brown and white underbelly; their heads are a dull greyish brown and have brown legs.

In winter, Eurasian chaffinch occurs as a non-breeding winter visitor in northwest Africa and can occur together with African chaffinches.

== Sound and vocal behaviour ==
The song is similar to the Eurasian chaffinch, but faster and more rhythmic, and lacking the flourish at the end. Its call sounds like a soft hwit sound singularly or in series or a high pitched wee. Sometimes these two calls are given together in a series.

== Breeding behaviour ==
The African chaffinch breeds from mid-March to mid-July. Their nests are placed on a trunk, branch, or in the fork of a bush or tree. Their nests are a deep cup made of moss, lichens, grass, plant fibres, animal hair and feathers, grass, fine roots, and bark strips. It breeds primarily in lowland woodlands, typically containing oak (Quercus sp.), hornbeam (Carpinus sp.), and pine (Pinus sp.), though some also breed in gardens and parks.

== Conservation status ==
Although this bird is generally uncommon in North Africa, it is locally common in some places, and not under immediate threat of extinction. It has not yet been evaluated as a separate species by Birdlife International, which considers it as subspecies of the common chaffinch, which has been assessed as a species with a global threat of Least Concern for the IUCN Red List.
