= Poláček =

Poláček (feminine: Poláčková) is a Czech and Slovak surname. The word is a diminutive from Polák (i.e. 'Pole') and polák (i.e. 'Aythya'). Notable people with the surname include:

- Alena Poláčková (born 1964), Slovak jurist and judge
- Caroline Polachek (born 1985), American singer
- František Poláček (1940–2017), Czech boxer
- Karel Poláček (1892–1945), Czech writer
- Klára Poláčková (born 1978), Czech mountaineer
- Tomáš Poláček (born 1980), Czech footballer
- Veronika Poláčková (born 1982), Czech actress

== See also ==
- Martin Polaček
