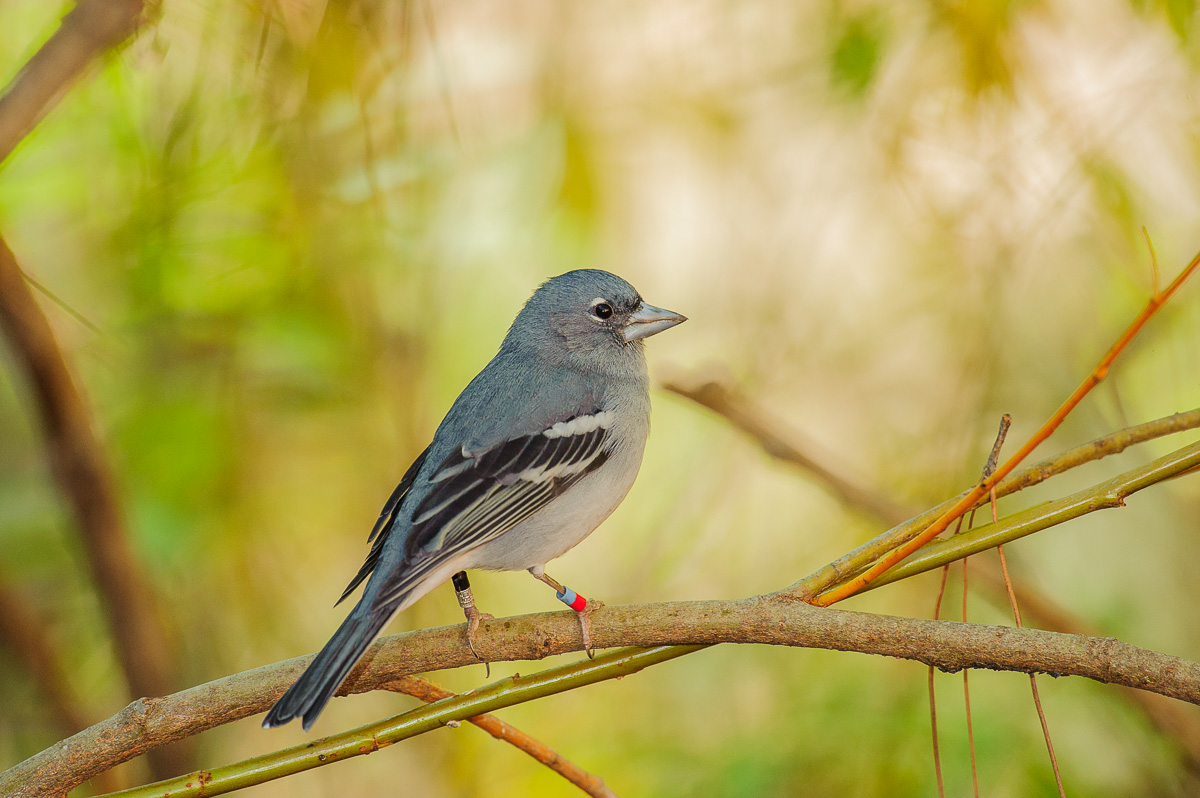
- Male

Conservation status
- Endangered (IUCN 3.1)

Scientific classification
- Kingdom: Animalia
- Phylum: Chordata
- Class: Aves
- Order: Passeriformes
- Family: Fringillidae
- Genus: Fringilla
- Species: F. polatzeki

Binomial name
- Fringilla polatzeki Hartert, 1905

Synonyms
- Fringilla teydea polatzeki Hartert, 1905

= Gran Canaria blue chaffinch =

Species of bird

The Gran Canaria blue chaffinch (Fringilla polatzeki) is a species of passerine bird in the finch family Fringillidae. It is endemic to Gran Canaria in Spain's Canary Islands.

== Taxonomy ==
Until 2015, the species Fringilla teydea was classified with two subspecies: Fringilla teydea polatzeki from Gran Canaria and Fringilla teydea teydea from Tenerife. However, a study published in March 2016 showed that their classification as different species, Fringilla polatzeki and Fringilla teydea (Tenerife blue chaffinch), is justified.

== Description ==
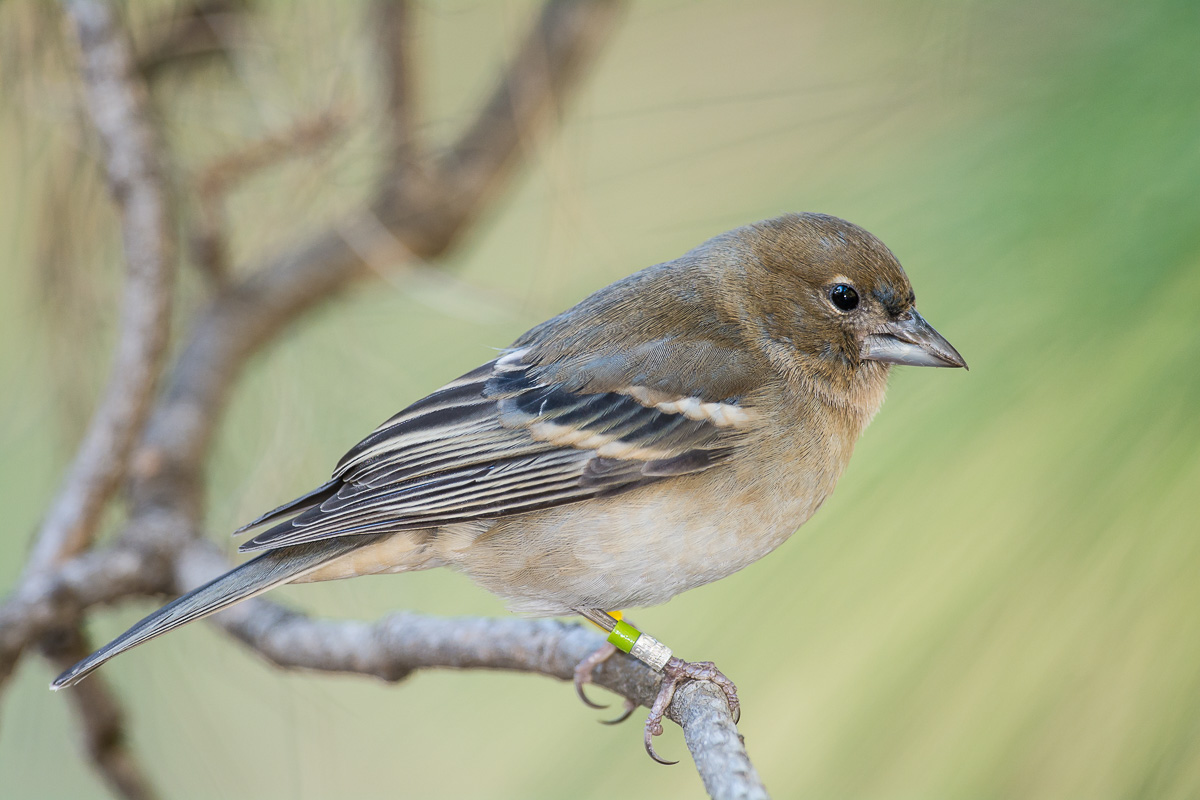
Female

The Gran Canaria blue chaffinch is slightly smaller than the Tenerife blue chaffinch; males weigh 27–29 g and females 26–28 g, compared to 31–33 g and 28–30 g respectively for Tenerife blue chaffinch. It also differs in having two white bands in the wings, and a whiter belly, with less blue shades, than Tenerife blue chaffinch.

Females are a dull grey-brown. The species is named after the collector Johann Polatzek (1838–1927).

== Distribution ==
This bird is found only in the highlands of Gran Canaria, mainly in the Inagua Natural Reserve. The species' primary habitat is mountain Canary Island pine (Pinus canariensis) forest at around 1,000 m altitude. It is most common in mature pine forest areas with dense, old trees.

== Behaviour ==
It primarily eats Canary Island pine seeds. Like the common chaffinch, but, unlike most other finches, its young are fed extensively on insects. Breeding from the end of April to late July or early August, it builds a nest from pine needles and broom branches and lays two eggs. This bird is not migratory. This bird breeding success is low with the cause of predation, mostly by the Great Spotted Woodpecker.

== Danger of extinction ==
The Gran Canaria blue chaffinch is one of the most endangered species of birds on the planet. Unlike the Tenerife blue chaffinch, which has a much wider distribution and compared to that island's population of its species, the Gran Canaria blue chaffinch has an extremely small population and is restricted to the area of the pine forests of Ojeda, Inagua and Pajonales.
