= Chiffchaff =

There are four species of bird named chiffchaff:

- Common chiffchaff, Phylloscopus collybita (also often commonly referred to as the chiffchaff)
- Iberian chiffchaff, Phylloscopus ibericus
- Canary Islands chiffchaff, Phylloscopus canariensis
  - Western Canary Islands chiffchaff, Phylloscopus canariensis canariensis
  - Eastern Canary Islands chiffchaff, Phylloscopus canariensis exsul
- Mountain chiffchaff, Phylloscopus sindianus
