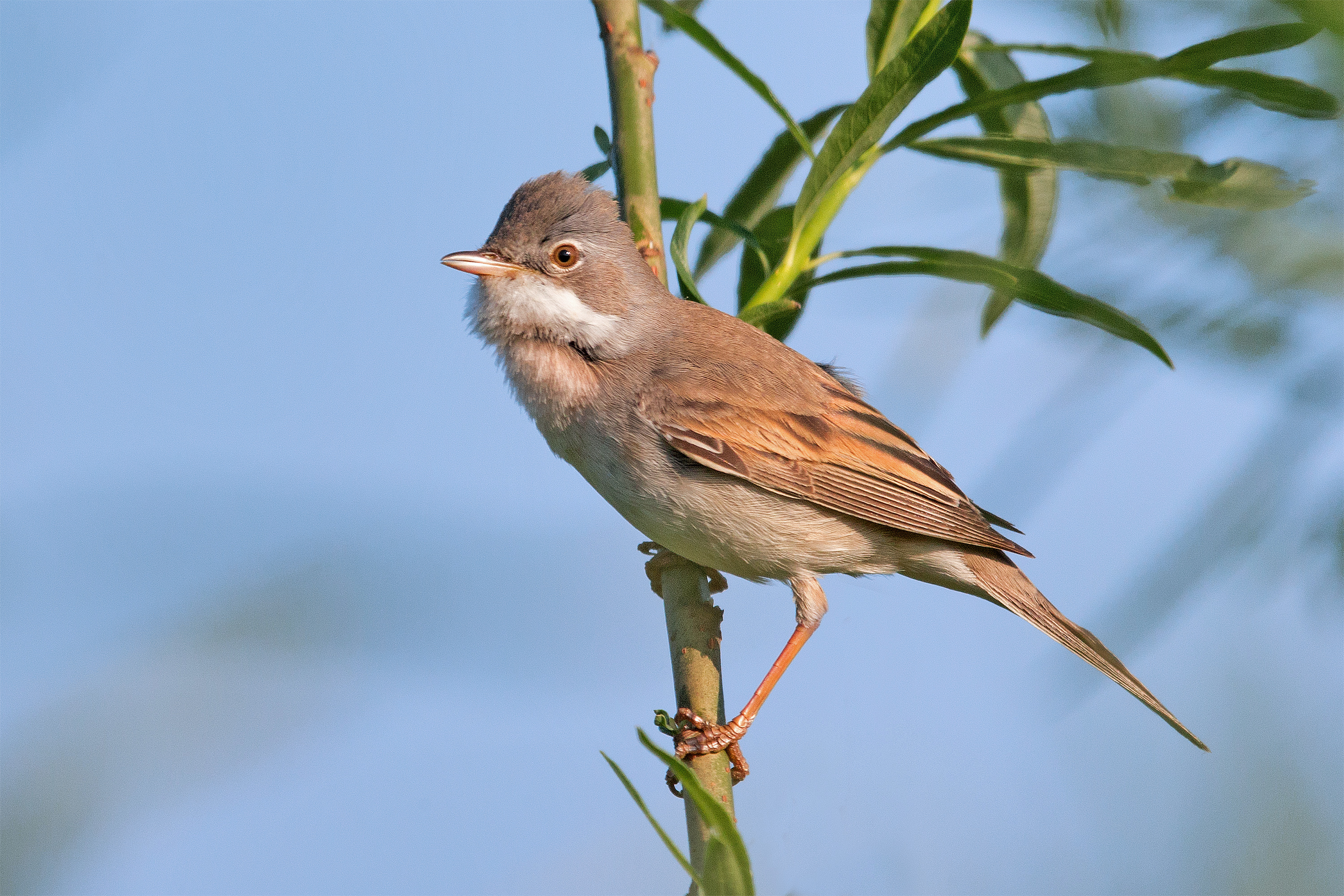

Conservation status
- Least Concern (IUCN 3.1)

Scientific classification
- Kingdom: Animalia
- Phylum: Chordata
- Class: Aves
- Order: Passeriformes
- Family: Sylviidae
- Genus: Curruca
- Species: C. communis

Binomial name
- Curruca communis (Latham, 1787)
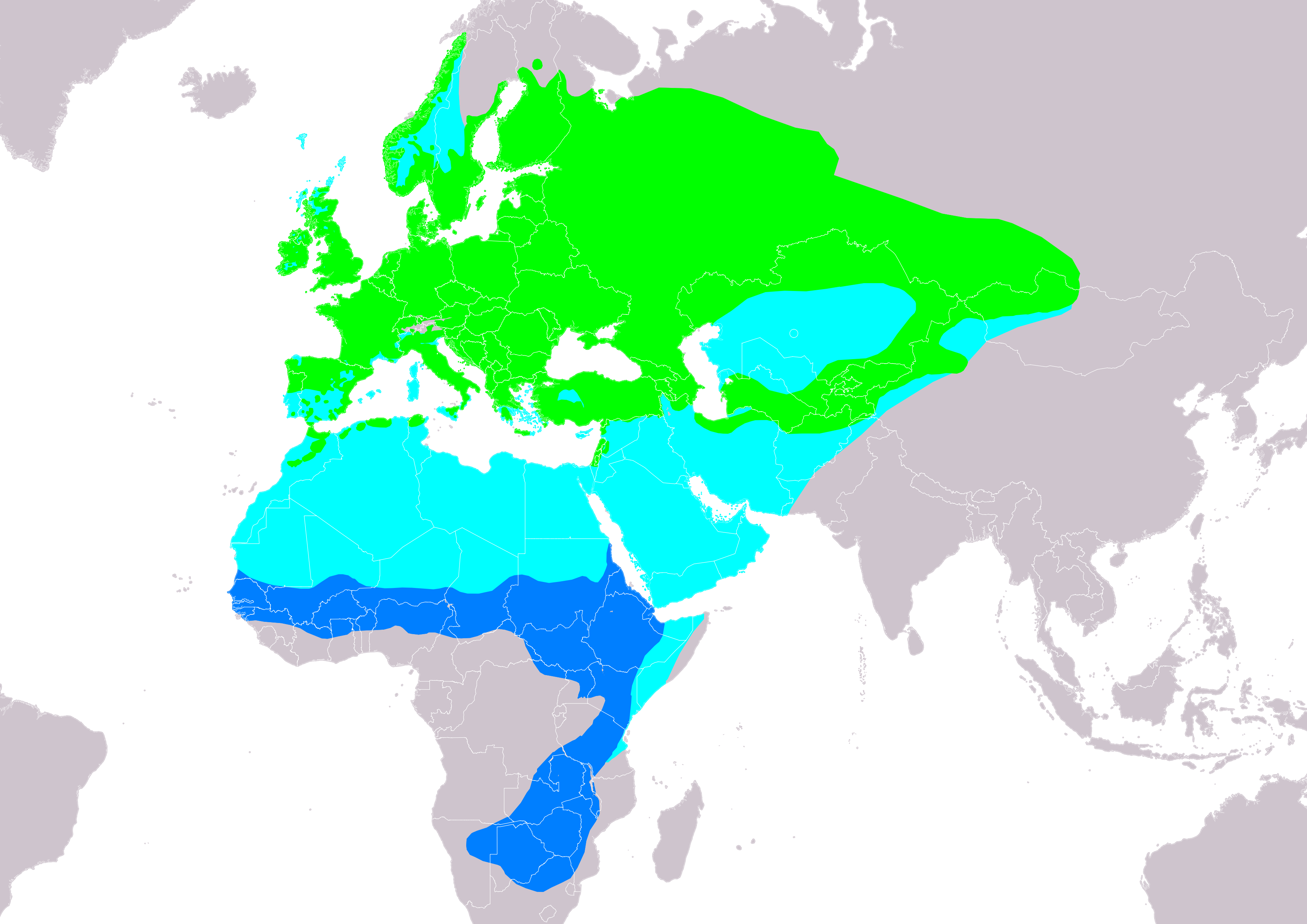
- Range of C. communis Breeding Passage Non-breeding

Synonyms
- Sylvia communis Latham, 1787; Sylvia cinerea Bechstein 1803

Audio
- Song

= Common whitethroat =

Species of bird

The greater whitethroat or common whitethroat (Curruca communis) is a common and widespread Old World warbler which breeds throughout Europe and across much of temperate western Asia. This small passerine bird is strongly migratory, and winters in tropical Africa, Arabia, and Pakistan.

== Taxonomy ==
The English ornithologist John Latham described the Greater whitethroat in 1783 in his A General Synopsis of Birds but introduced the binomial name Sylvia communis in the supplement to this work which was published in 1787. The specific communis is Latin for "common". The common whitethroat is now placed in the genus Curruca that was introduced by the German naturalist Johann Matthäus Bechstein in 1802.

This species may appear to be closely related to the lesser whitethroat, the species having evolved only during the end of the last ice age similar to the willow warbler and chiffchaffs. However, researchers found the presence of a white throat is an unreliable morphological marker for relationships in Curruca, and the greater and lesser whitethroats are not closely related. A molecular phylogenetic study of the Sylviidae published in 2011 found that within the genus Curruca the common whitethroat and the lesser whitethroat are members of different clades and are thus not sister species.

Four subspecies are recognised:

- C. c. communis (Latham, 1787) – breeds in Europe to north Turkey and north Africa; winters in west and central Africa
- C. c. volgensis (Domaniewski, 1915) – breeds in southeast European Russia, west Siberia and north Kazakhstan; winters in east and south Africa
- C. c. icterops (Ménétries, 1832) – breeds in central Turkey to Turkmenistan and Iran; winters in east and south Africa
- C. c. rubicola (Stresemann, 1928) – breeds in mountains of central Asia; winters in east and south Africa

== Description ==
This is one of several Curruca species that has distinct male and female plumages. Both sexes are mainly brown above and buff below, with chestnut fringes to the secondary remiges. The adult male has a grey head and a white throat. The female lacks the grey head, and the throat is duller.

The whitethroat's song is fast and scratchy, with a scolding tone. The hoarse, slightly nasal, call sounds like wed-wed or woid-woid. The warning cry is long-pulled, rough tschehr which resembles that of the Dartford warbler.

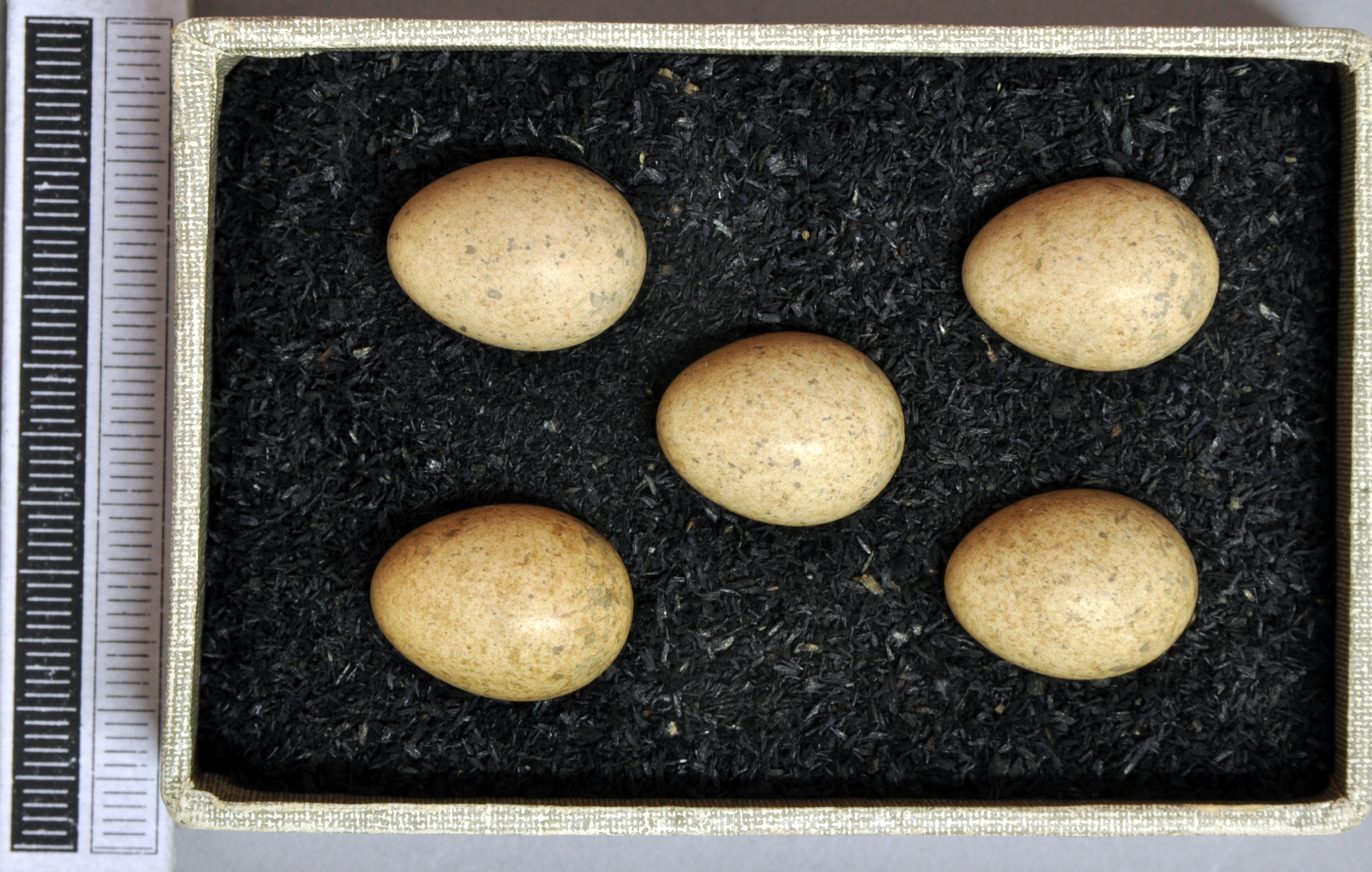
Eggs, Collection Museum Wiesbaden, Germany

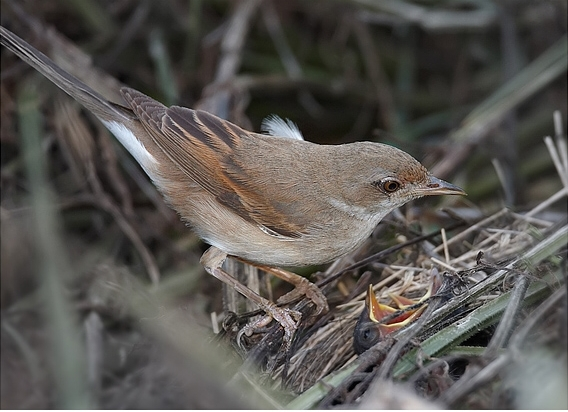
Female with chicks

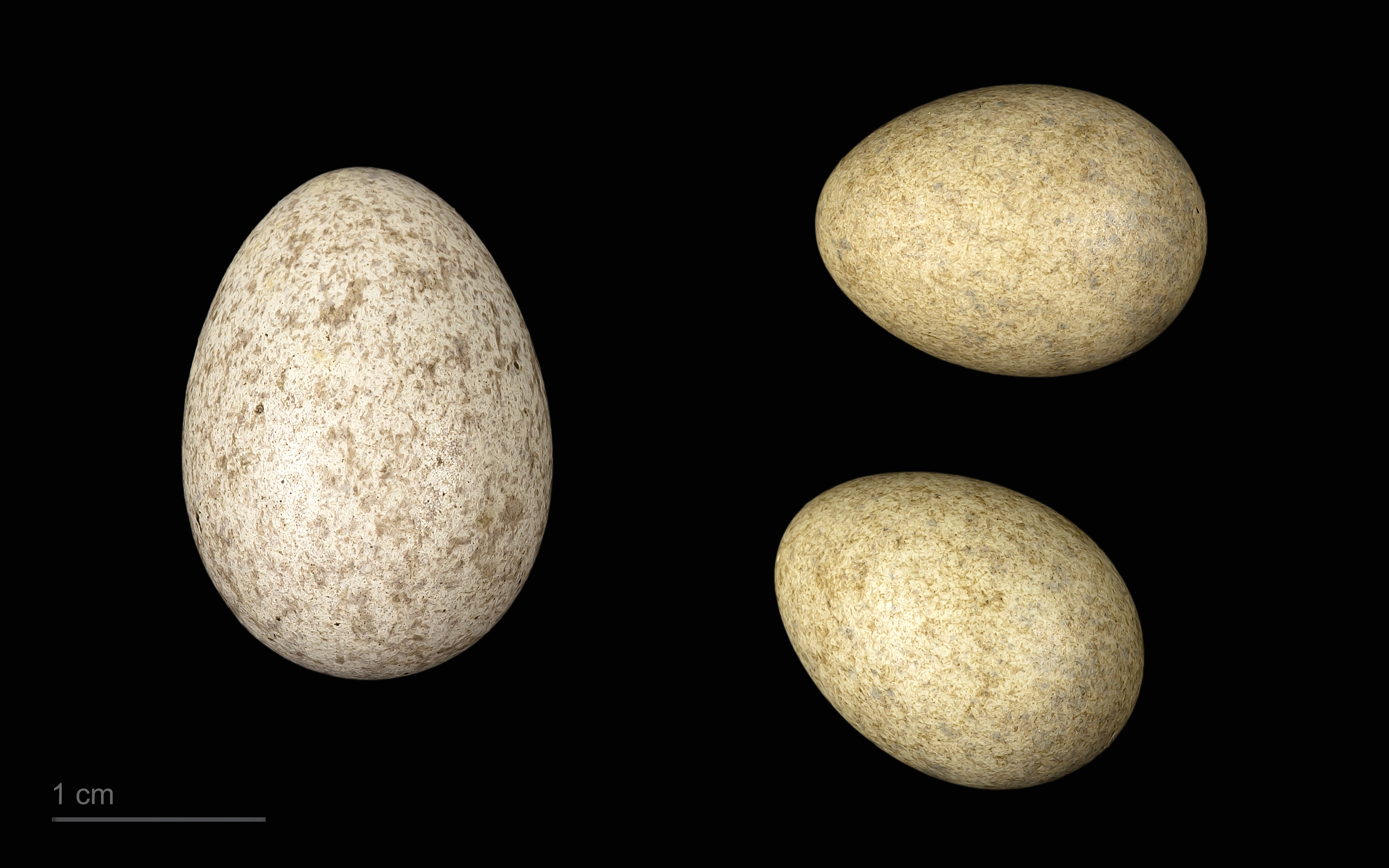
Cuculus canorus canorus in a clutch of Sylvia communis - MHNT

== Distribution and habitat ==
This is a bird of open country and cultivation, with bushes for nesting. The nest is built in low shrub or brambles, and 3–7 eggs are laid. Like most warblers, it is insectivorous, but will also eat berries and other soft fruit.

In Europe, western and eastern populations of common whitethroats have contrasting moulting and pre-migratory fueling strategies to capitalise on food supplies before departing their breeding and non-breeding grounds.
