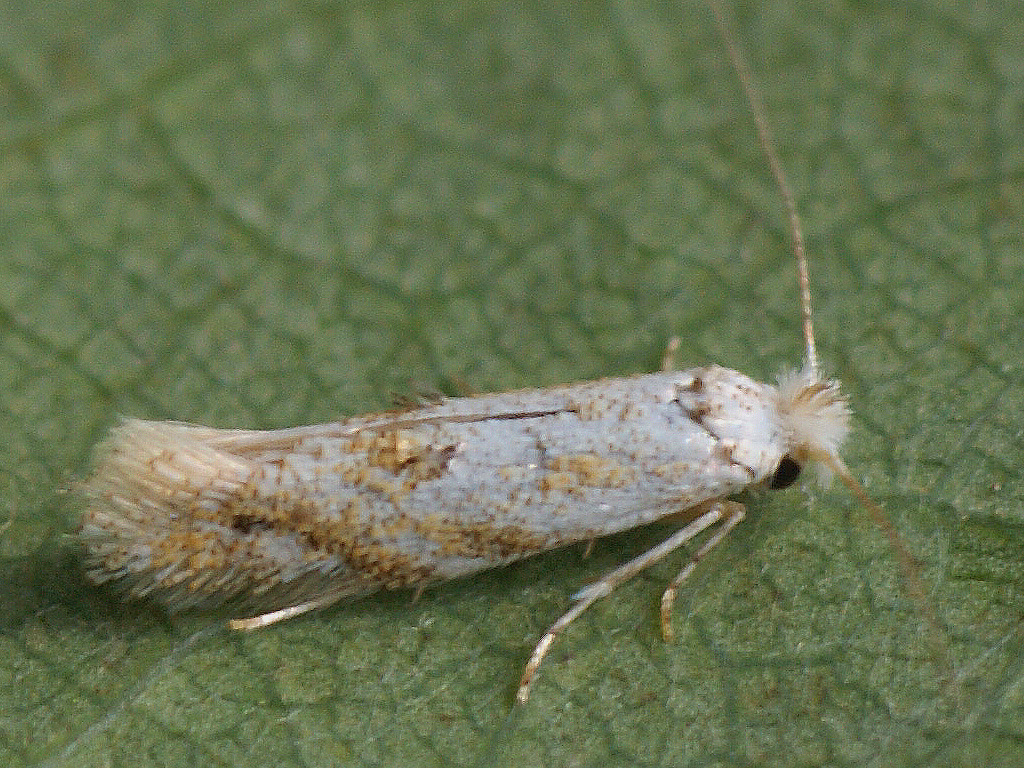

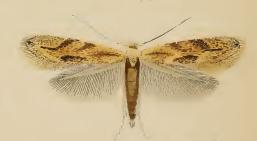

Scientific classification
- Kingdom: Animalia
- Phylum: Arthropoda
- Clade: Pancrustacea
- Class: Insecta
- Order: Lepidoptera
- Family: Bucculatricidae
- Genus: Bucculatrix
- Species: B. bechsteinella

Binomial name
- Bucculatrix bechsteinella (Bechstein & Scharfenberg, 1805)

Synonyms
- Tinea bechsteinella Bechstein & Scharfenberg, 1805; Lyonetia crataegi Zeller, 1839; Bucculatrix crataegi; Elachista crataegifoliella Duponchel, 1843

= Bucculatrix bechsteinella =

Species of moth

Bucculatrix bechsteinella is a moth of the family Bucculatricidae. It was described by Johann Matthäus Bechstein and Georg Ludwig Scharfenberg in 1805. It is found in most of Europe, except Greece and Bulgaria.

The wingspan is 7–9 mm. The head is pale fuscous, mixed in middle with blackish. Forewings are brownish-whitish, irrorated with dark fuscous; a more or less distinct dark streak along fold from base to near middle, often incomplete; three oblique costal spots between 1/3 and apex, and a median dorsal spot suffusedly dark fuscous: second discal stigma forming a short blackish dash. Hindwings are grey. The larva is dull green, more yellowish above; dorsal line darker; dots yellowish and the head pale brown

Adults are on wing from mid-May to mid-August. The larvae feed on Amelanchier, Chaenomeles, Cotoneaster, Crataegus douglasii, Crataegus laevigata, Crataegus monogyna, Cydonia oblonga, Malus domestica, Mespilus germanica, Prunus insititia, Prunus spinosa, Pyracantha coccinea, Pyrus communis, Sorbus aria, Sorbus aucuparia and Sorbus torminalis. They mine the leaves of their host plant. Larvae can be found from June to August.

== Gallery ==
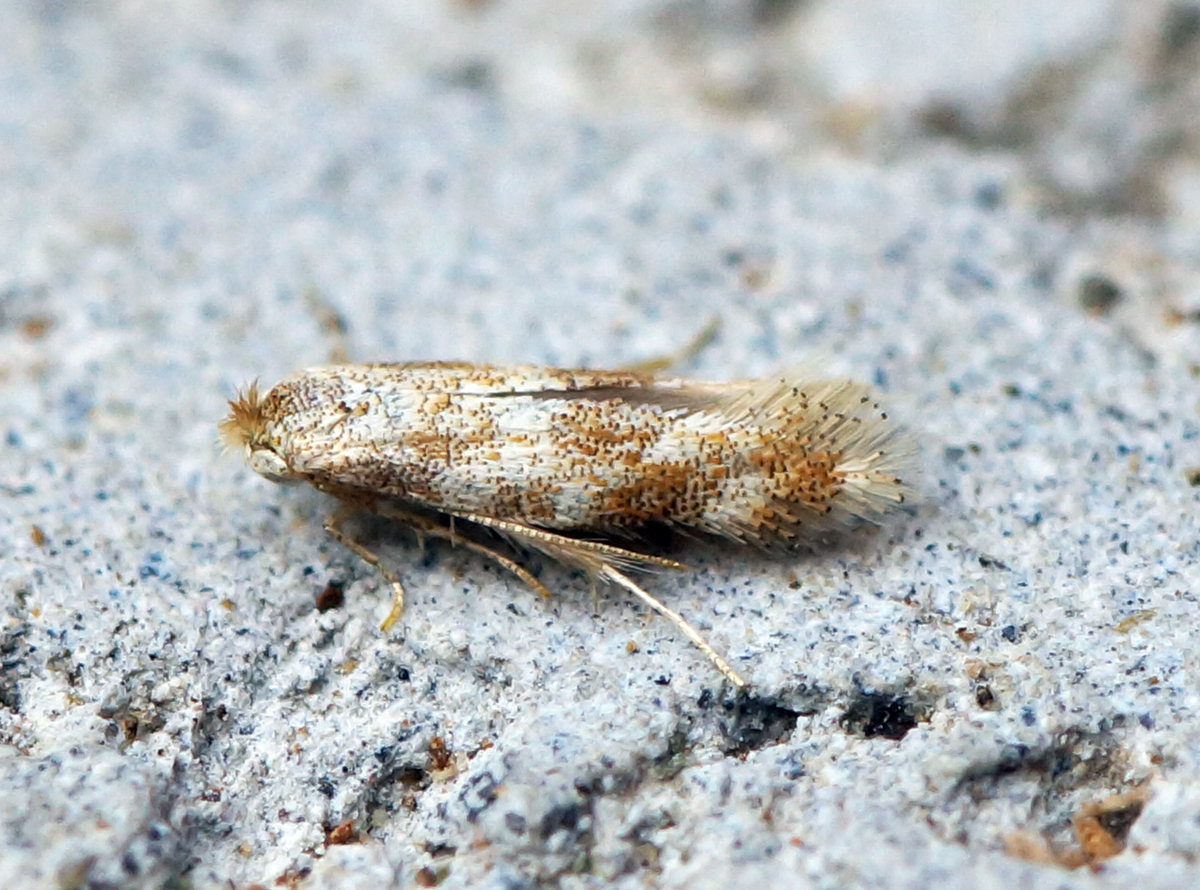
Imago

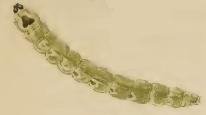
Mining larva

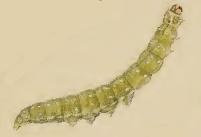
Externally feeding larva

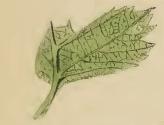
Hawthorn leaf, mined and with a cocoonet under which the larva moults

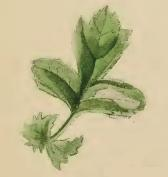
Gnawed hawthorn leaf

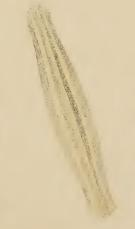
Cocoon
