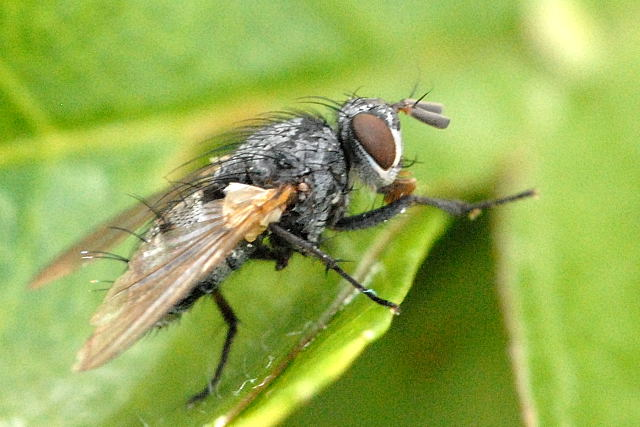

Scientific classification
- Kingdom: Animalia
- Phylum: Arthropoda
- Class: Insecta
- Order: Diptera
- Family: Tachinidae
- Subfamily: Exoristinae
- Tribe: Goniini
- Genus: Cyzenis
- Species: C. albicans

Binomial name
- Cyzenis albicans (Fallén, 1810)

Synonyms
- Cyzenis hemisphaerica Robineau-Desvoidy, 1863; Cyzenis vernalis Robineau-Desvoidy, 1863; Paraneaera varipes Strobl, 1900; Tachina albicans Fallén, 1810; Tachina ferrugineotibialis Zetterstedt, 1859; Tachina leucophaea Meigen, 1824; Tachina perturbans Zetterstedt, 1844; Tachina schistacea Meigen, 1824

= Cyzenis albicans =

Species of fly

Cyzenis albicans is a species of fly in the family Tachinidae. A parasitoid, it lays its eggs on leaves of oak, maple, birch and other trees, so that when the leaves are consumed by the larvae of the host winter moth, the eggs hatch inside the larvae. The fly is native to Europe and Asia but has been introduced into North America as a biological control agent of the invasive winter moth.

== Ecology ==
Cyzenis albicans is a parasitoid, the female laying its eggs on the surface of leaves which are then eaten by the larvae of suitable host moth species. This fly is synovigenic, continuing to produce and mature eggs throughout its adult life and needing to feed in order to do so. The fly larvae feed internally on the moth larvae, pupating within the moth pupae when their hosts have fallen to the ground, and emerging as adults the following spring.

== Hosts ==
In Europe and Asia, where this fly is native, the larvae of several geometrid moths are parasitised. These include the winter moth (Operophtera brumata), the northern winter moth (Operophtera fagata), the oak nycteoline (Nycteola revayana), the elm autumn moth (Ypsolopha vittella) and the pimpinel pug (Eupithecia pimpinellata). In North American, where it has been introduced, it is only known to use winter moth (Operophtera brumata) as a host.

== Use in biological control ==
The winter moth first appeared in Nova Scotia, Canada, in the 1920s. By 1949 it had spread, causing defoliation of trees on a wide scale, and had been identified as a pest species. In 1954 and 1955, several insect species were introduced from Europe in an attempt to control it. The most successful of these were the parasitic wasp Agrypon flaveolatum and the parasitoid fly C. albicans, both of which became established in Canada. As the numbers of parasites built up, so the populations of the winter moth declined.

Winter moths were first noted in the United States in the late 1990s in the state of Massachusetts. During the next decade they spread from Boston, south to Martha's Vineyard and Cape Cod, into Rhode Island, and Connecticut. There also have been outbreaks of winter moth in coastal New Hampshire and Maine. Winter moth defoliates maples, oaks, fruit trees, and other deciduous trees. Attempts at biological control followed with the release of C. albicans since 2005. The wasp was considered unsuitable because it is unknown if it is host specific and there are some rare geometrid moths in the area. The fly has become successfully established in Massachusetts, and the level of parasitism of the moth larvae had reached 20–50% by 2015, after thousands of Cyzenis albicans were released at 17 sites in New England.

In its native range, C. albicans has very little impact on populations of winter moth, and its success in biological control of this invasive pest in Canada and the United States was difficult to predict; soil conditions seem to have been of importance, and there may have been a dearth of natural enemies to prey on the flies, enabling them to become established. A recent study on the mortality factors affecting C. albicans puparia in Massachusetts shows that, in fact, C. albicans experiences heavy mortality from generalist pupal predators and parasitoids.
