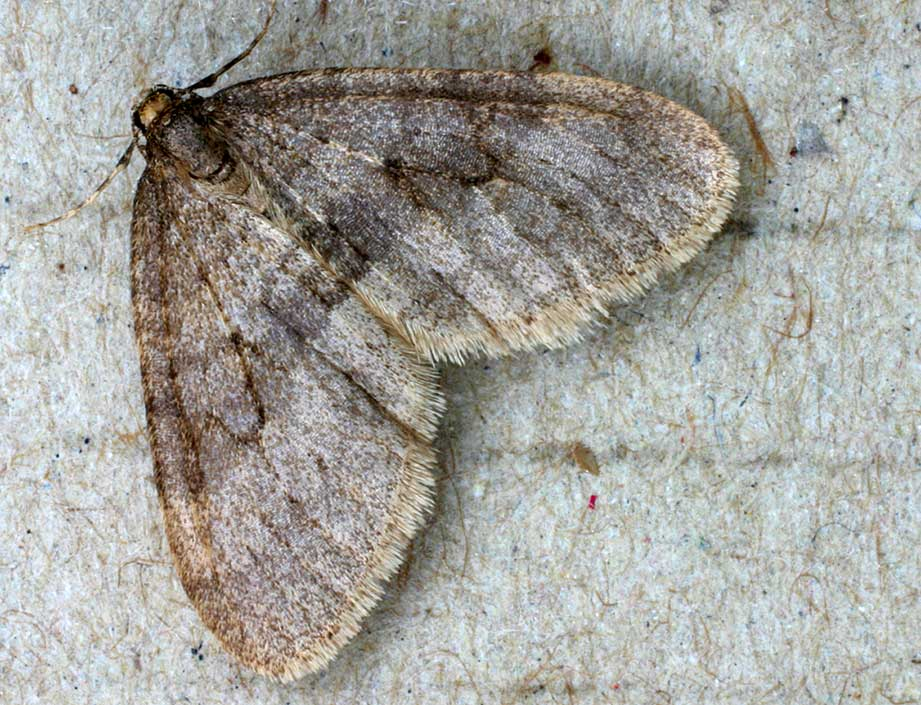
- Operophtera brumata

Scientific classification
- Kingdom: Animalia
- Phylum: Arthropoda
- Class: Insecta
- Order: Lepidoptera
- Family: Geometridae
- Tribe: Operophterini
- Genus: Operophtera; Hübner, 1825

Synonyms
- Rachela Hulst, 1896

= Operophtera =

Genus of moths

Operophtera is a genus of moths in the family Geometridae erected by Jacob Hübner in 1825.

== Selected species ==
- Operophtera bruceata (Hulst, 1886) – bruce spanworm (also native winter moth in North America)
- Operophtera brumata (Linnaeus, 1758) – winter moth
- Operophtera danbyi (Hulst, 1896)
- Operophtera fagata (Scharfenberg, 1805) – northern winter moth
