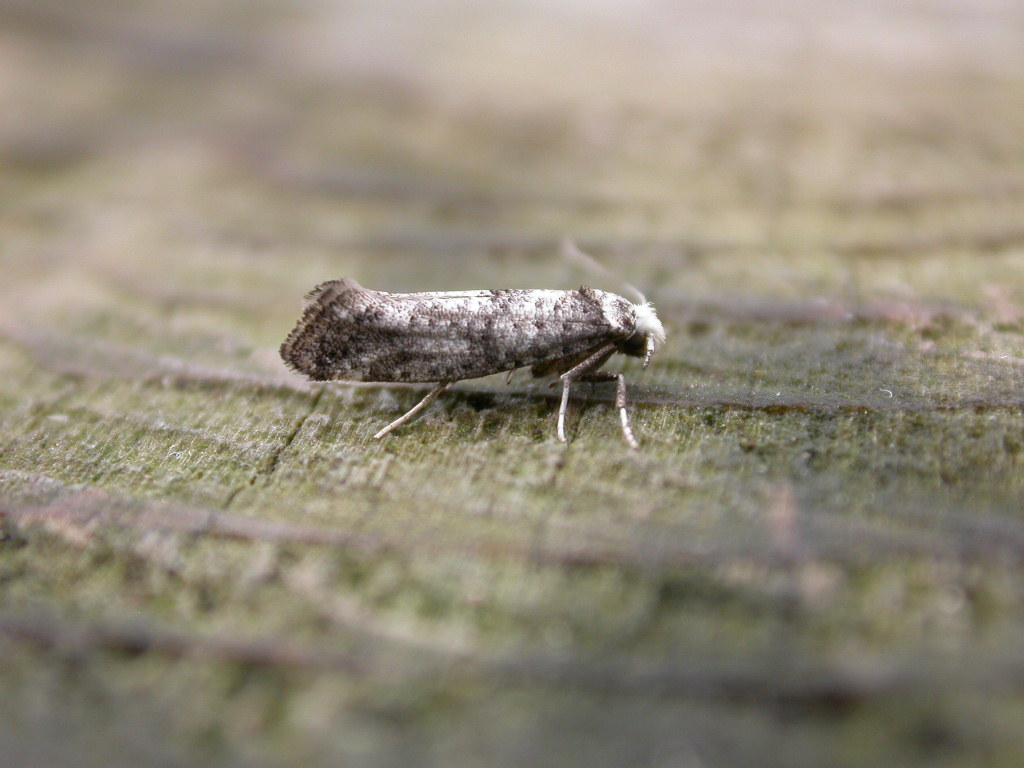
- Paraswammerdamia lutarea

Scientific classification
- Domain: Eukaryota
- Kingdom: Animalia
- Phylum: Arthropoda
- Class: Insecta
- Order: Lepidoptera
- Family: Yponomeutidae
- Subfamily: Yponomeutinae
- Genus: Paraswammerdamia; Friese, 1960

Species
- See text

= Paraswammerdamia =

Genus of moths

Paraswammerdamia is a genus of moths of the family Yponomeutidae.

== Species ==
- Paraswammerdamia albicapitella - (Scharfenberg, 1805)
- Paraswammerdamia conspersella - (Tengstrom, 1848)
- Paraswammerdamia iranella - Friese, 1960
- Paraswammerdamia lapponica - Petersen, 1932
- Paraswammerdamia lutarea - Haworth, 1828
- Paraswammerdamia ornichella - Friese, 1960
- Paraswammerdamia ruthiella - Steuer, 1993
