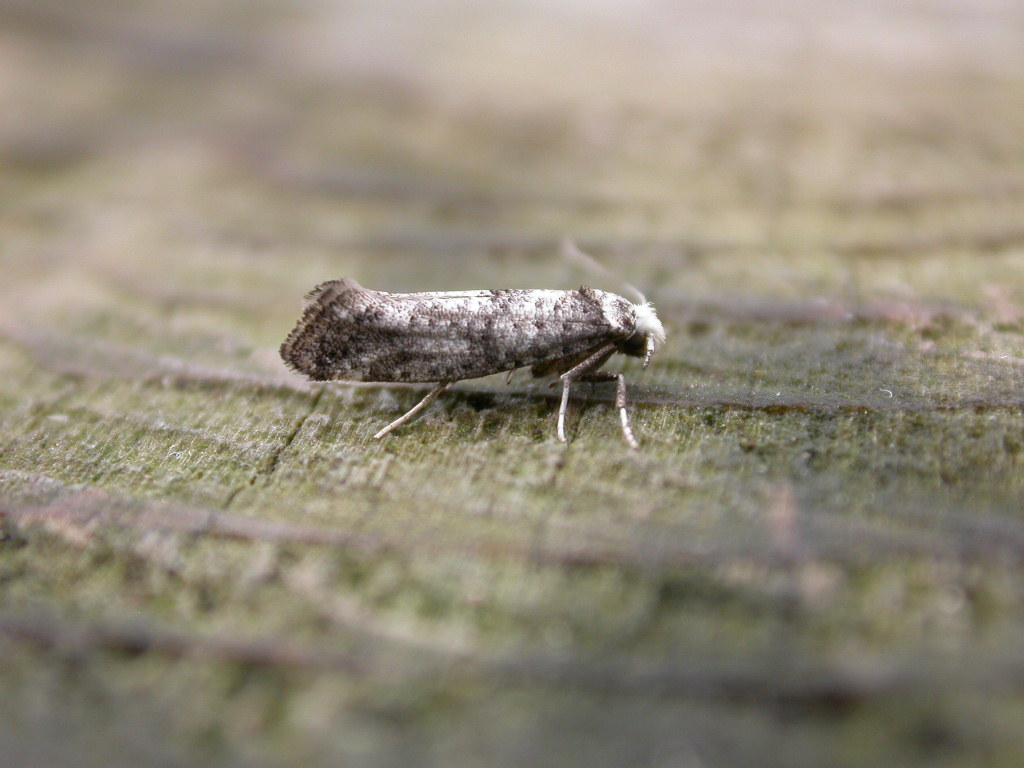

Scientific classification
- Kingdom: Animalia
- Phylum: Arthropoda
- Clade: Pancrustacea
- Class: Insecta
- Order: Lepidoptera
- Family: Yponomeutidae
- Genus: Paraswammerdamia
- Species: P. lutarea

Binomial name
- Paraswammerdamia lutarea (Haworth, 1828)

Synonyms
- Erminea lutarea Haworth, 1828; Tinea nebulella Goeze, 1783; Tinea oxyacanthella Duponchel, 1842; Paraswammerdamia nebulella; Paraswammerdamia oxyacanthella

= Paraswammerdamia lutarea =

Species of moth

Paraswammerdamia lutarea is a moth of the family Yponomeutidae. It is found in Europe.

The wingspan is 11–14 mm. The head is white, sometimes ochreous-tinged. Thorax fuscous, sometimes whitish-sprinkled. Forewings are fuscous-whitish, closely irrorated with dark fuscous; some longitudinal series of indistinct dark fuscous dots; a dark fuscous entire fascia before middle; a white costal spot before apex; cilia fuscous, with two darker lines. Hindwings are fuscous. The larva is deep brown; subdorsal line white, orange-spotted; spiracular white, on 5-1 2 orange-spotted above; head ochreous-brown, blackish-marked.

Adults are on wing in July depending on the location.

The larvae feed on Crataegus, Sorbus aucuparia, Rosa and Cotoneaster horizontalis.
