= Paraswammerdamia conspersella =

Scientific classification
- Domain: Eukaryota
- Kingdom: Animalia
- Phylum: Arthropoda
- Class: Insecta
- Order: Lepidoptera
- Family: Yponomeutidae
- Genus: Paraswammerdamia
- Species: P. conspersella

Binomial name
- Paraswammerdamia conspersella (Tengström, 1848)

Synonyms
- Tinea conspersella Tengström, 1848; Swammerdamia conspersella

Species of moth

Paraswammerdamia conspersella is a moth of the family Yponomeutidae. It is found in northern Europe, Ukraine, France and Switzerland. It was recently reported from Canada (Québec).

The wingspan is 11–14 mm. Adults are on wing from June to August.

The larvae feed on Empetrum nigrum. Mining larvae can be found in autumn.
