= Paraswammerdamia ruthiella =

Scientific classification
- Domain: Eukaryota
- Kingdom: Animalia
- Phylum: Arthropoda
- Class: Insecta
- Order: Lepidoptera
- Family: Yponomeutidae
- Genus: Paraswammerdamia
- Species: P. ruthiella

Binomial name
- Paraswammerdamia ruthiella Steuer, 1993

Species of moth

Paraswammerdamia ruthiella is a moth of the family Yponomeutidae. It is found in Germany.
