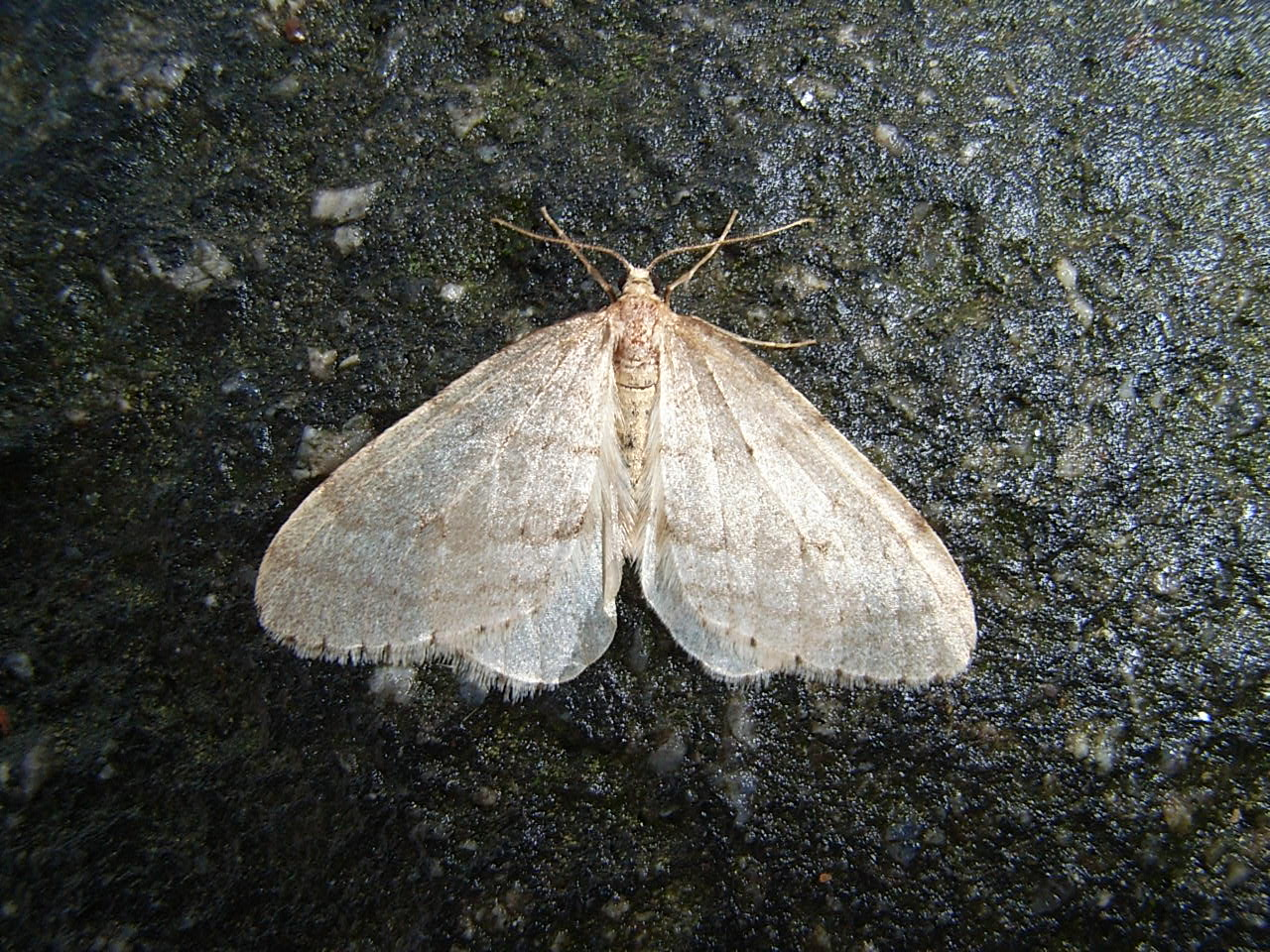
- Male

Scientific classification
- Domain: Eukaryota
- Kingdom: Animalia
- Phylum: Arthropoda
- Class: Insecta
- Order: Lepidoptera
- Family: Geometridae
- Genus: Operophtera
- Species: O. fagata

Binomial name
- Operophtera fagata (Scharfenberg, 1805)

= Operophtera fagata =

Species of moth

Operophtera fagata, the northern winter moth, is a moth of the family Geometridae. It is widespread through much of Europe.

== Geographic distribution ==
This species’ range extends through central and northern Europe to southeast Russia. It is widespread in the UK and Northern Ireland.

== Habitat ==
In Europe, this species prefers common beech woodland, but will also use birch. The larvae feed on apple (Malus), plum, cherry (Prunus), birch (Betula), lime (Tilia), beech (Fagus).

== Morphology ==
=== Egg ===
The oval egg is blunt at the micropyle end and has a strongly reticulated surface. It is pale green at first, becoming pale orange.

=== Caterpillar ===
The larva is initially greenish black with white lines along the body and black or dark brown head. It gradually becomes more yellowish green.

=== Pupa ===
The pupa is yellowish brown and larger than in O. brumata. The cremaster comprises a short, stout shaft with long divergent spikes.

=== Adult ===
The adult male measures up to 33 mm in body length. The forewings are silvery greyish brown with dark brown crossbands. The hindwing is yellowish white. The head and body are pale yellowish brown. The female is smaller and has greatly reduced wings, so is flightless.

== Similar species ==
This species morphologically resembles its congener Operophtera brumata, but males of O. fagata are slightly larger and do not have the brown underwings characteristic of Operophtera brumata. Microscopically, there are also clear differences in the morphology of the genitalia between the two species. In O. fagata, the uncus is more pointed with a broader and flatter base that is more triangular in O. brumata (Kellner, 2005). Although co-occurring in the same habitat with overlapping flight times, the two species do not interbreed, which is probably because females produce species-specific pheromones that attract males of only their own species.

== Reproduction and life history ==
From mid-May until early June, mature larvae fall from trees to the woodland floor to pupate in the soil. They remain there until October and November when adults emerge to reproduce. Wingless females crawl up tree trunks, while males fly in swarms at night to encounter females to mate with. Females lay eggs on twigs close to leaf buds in November, where they overwinter. In the UK, adults are active October - December. The larvae hatch April – May, which in Europe happens at the same time as birch leaves come out.

== Pest status ==
The larva of this moth can be a serious pest of fruit trees in northern Britain by attacking the foliage and blossom. Damage to fruit trees by defoliation is more likely when birch trees, a natural host plant, are growing nearby. In Northern and Central Europe, the larva is a serious defoliator of beech and birch plantations and can sometimes destroy whole seedling plantations.

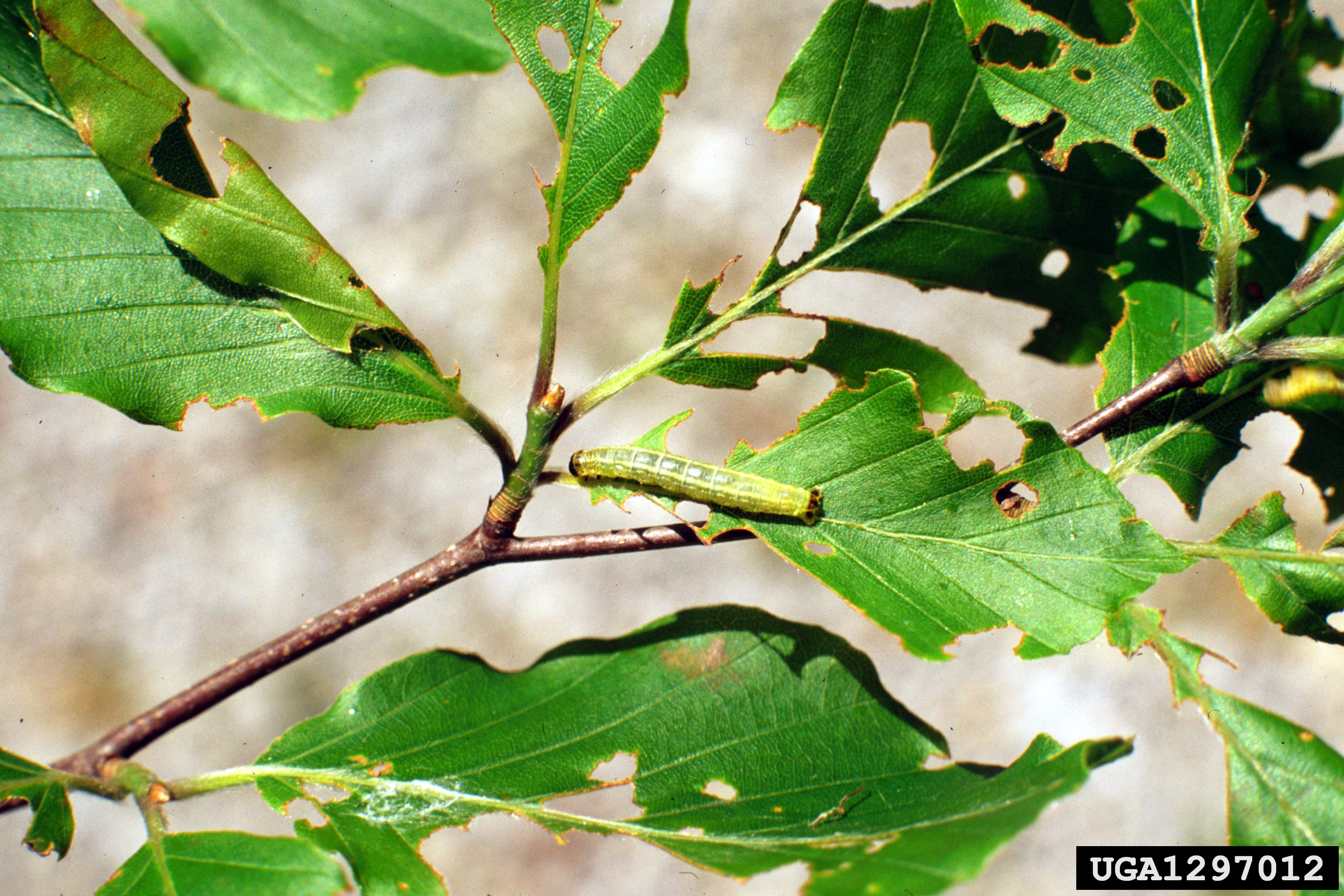
Caterpillar

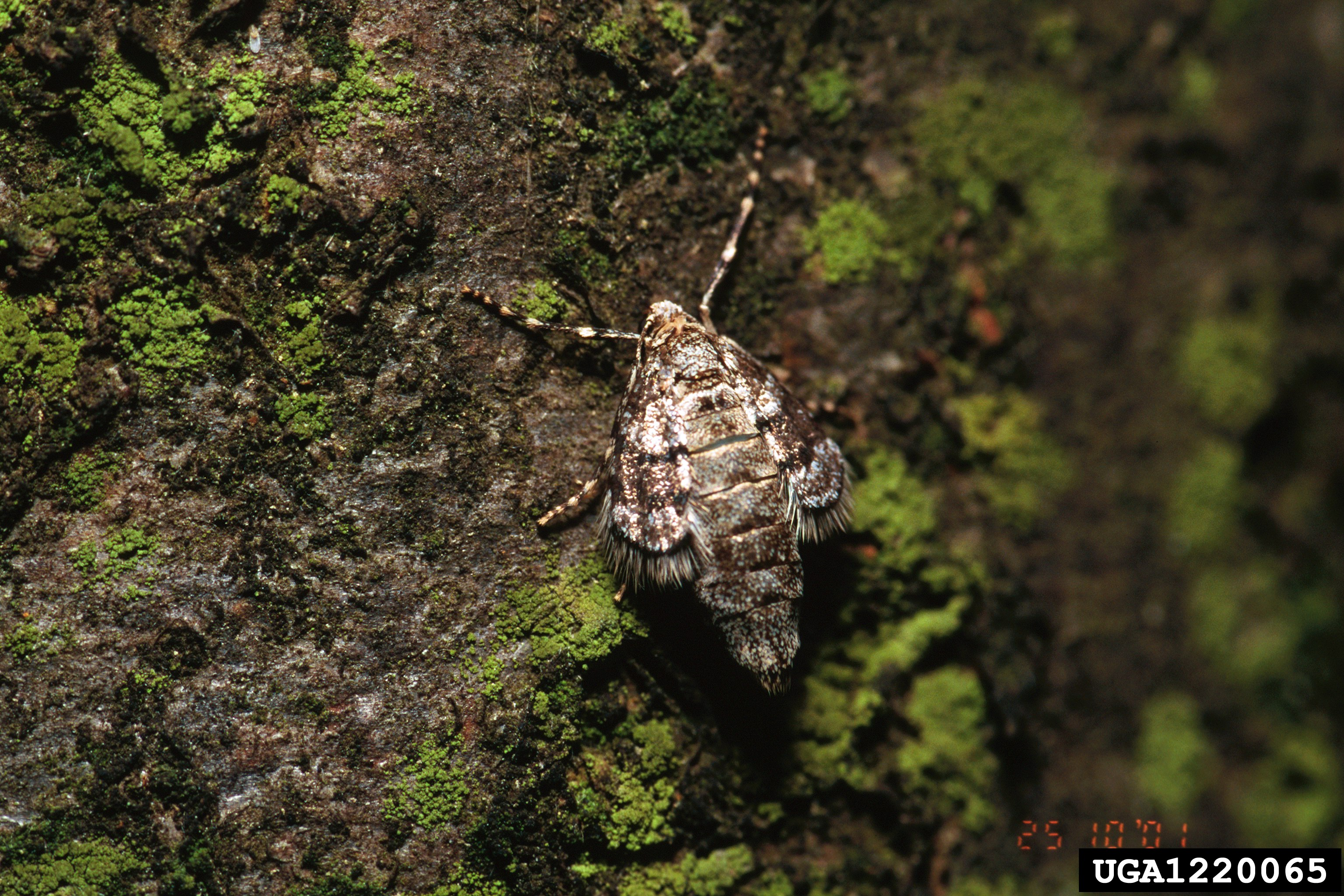
Female

=== External links ===
- Northern winter moth at UK Moths
- Fauna Europaea
- Lepiforum.de
- Vlindernet.nl (in Dutch)
