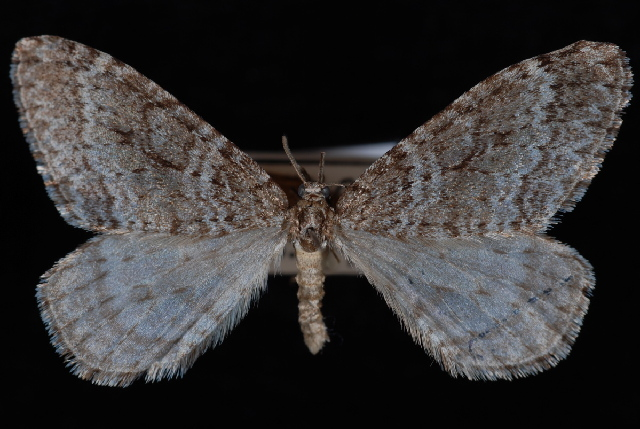

Scientific classification
- Domain: Eukaryota
- Kingdom: Animalia
- Phylum: Arthropoda
- Class: Insecta
- Order: Lepidoptera
- Family: Geometridae
- Genus: Operophtera
- Species: O. danbyi

Binomial name
- Operophtera danbyi (Hulst, 1896)

= Operophtera danbyi =

Species of moth

Operophtera danbyi is a species of geometrid moths in the family Geometridae described by George Duryea Hulst in 1896. It is found in North America.

The MONA or Hodges number for Operophtera danbyi is 7439.
