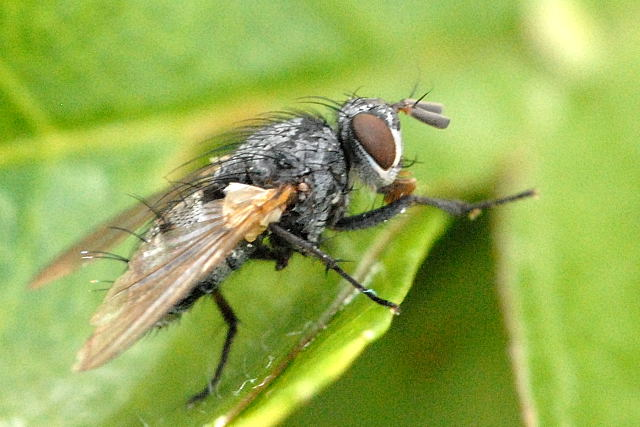
- Cyzenis albicans

Scientific classification
- Kingdom: Animalia
- Phylum: Arthropoda
- Class: Insecta
- Order: Diptera
- Family: Tachinidae
- Subfamily: Exoristinae
- Tribe: Goniini
- Genus: Cyzenis; Robineau-Desvoidy, 1863

Type species
- Cyzenis haemisphaerica Robineau-Desvoidy, 1863

Synonyms
- Bavaria Brauer & von Berganstamm, 1889; Monochaeta Brauer & von Berganstamm, 1889; Pseudodidyma Townsend, 1915

= Cyzenis =

Genus of flies

Cyzenis is a genus of flies in the family Tachinidae.

== Species ==
- Cyzenis albicans (Fallén, 1810)
- Cyzenis browni (Curran, 1933)
- Cyzenis equifacialis Shima, Abe & Libra, 2021
- Cyzenis festinans (Aldrich & Webber, 1924)
- Cyzenis incrassata (Smith, 1912)
- Cyzenis jucunda (Meigen, 1838)
- Cyzenis mitis (Curran, 1930)
- Cyzenis terasetosa Shima, Abe & Libra, 2021
- Cyzenis ustulata (Reinhard, 1959)
