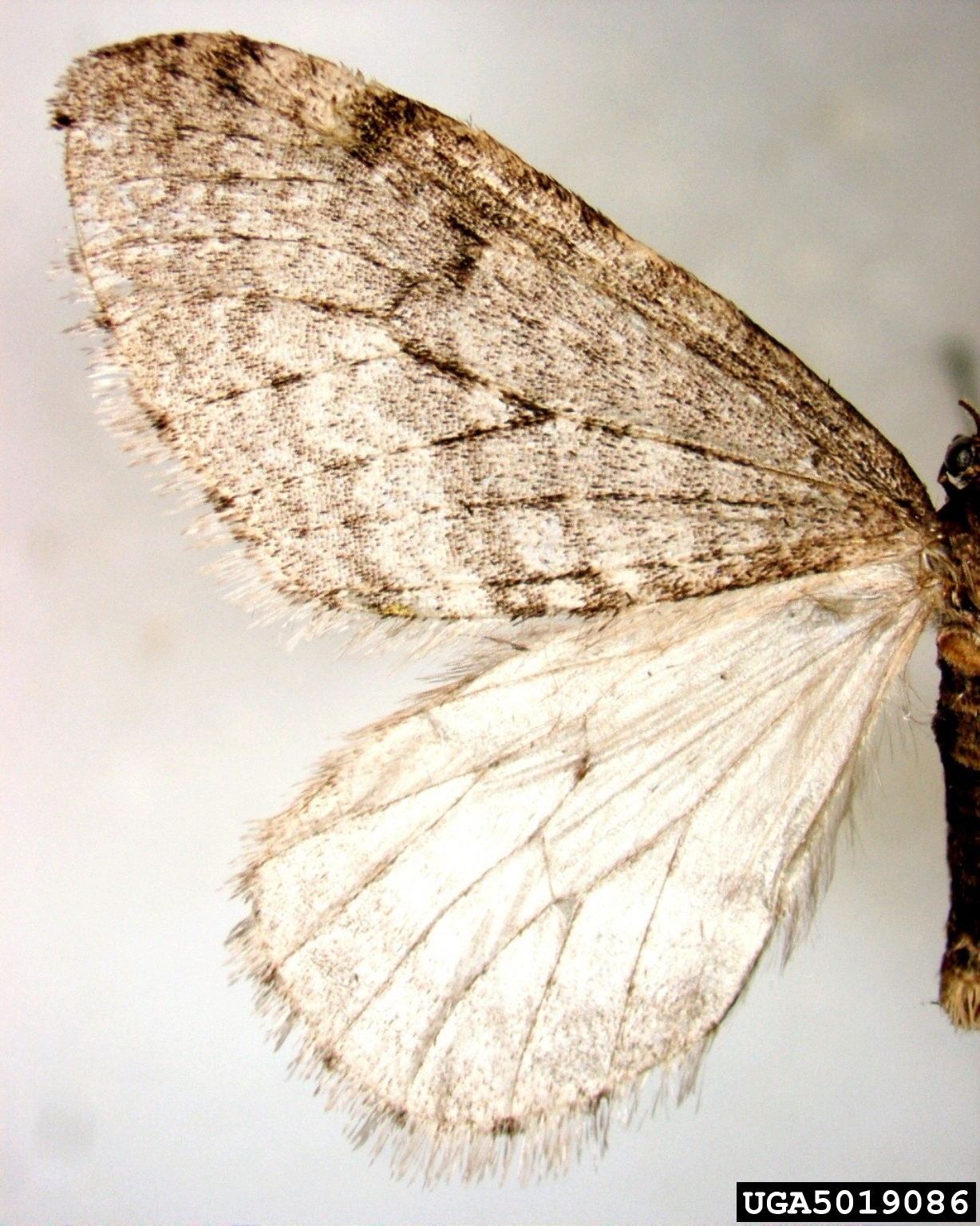
- Adult male
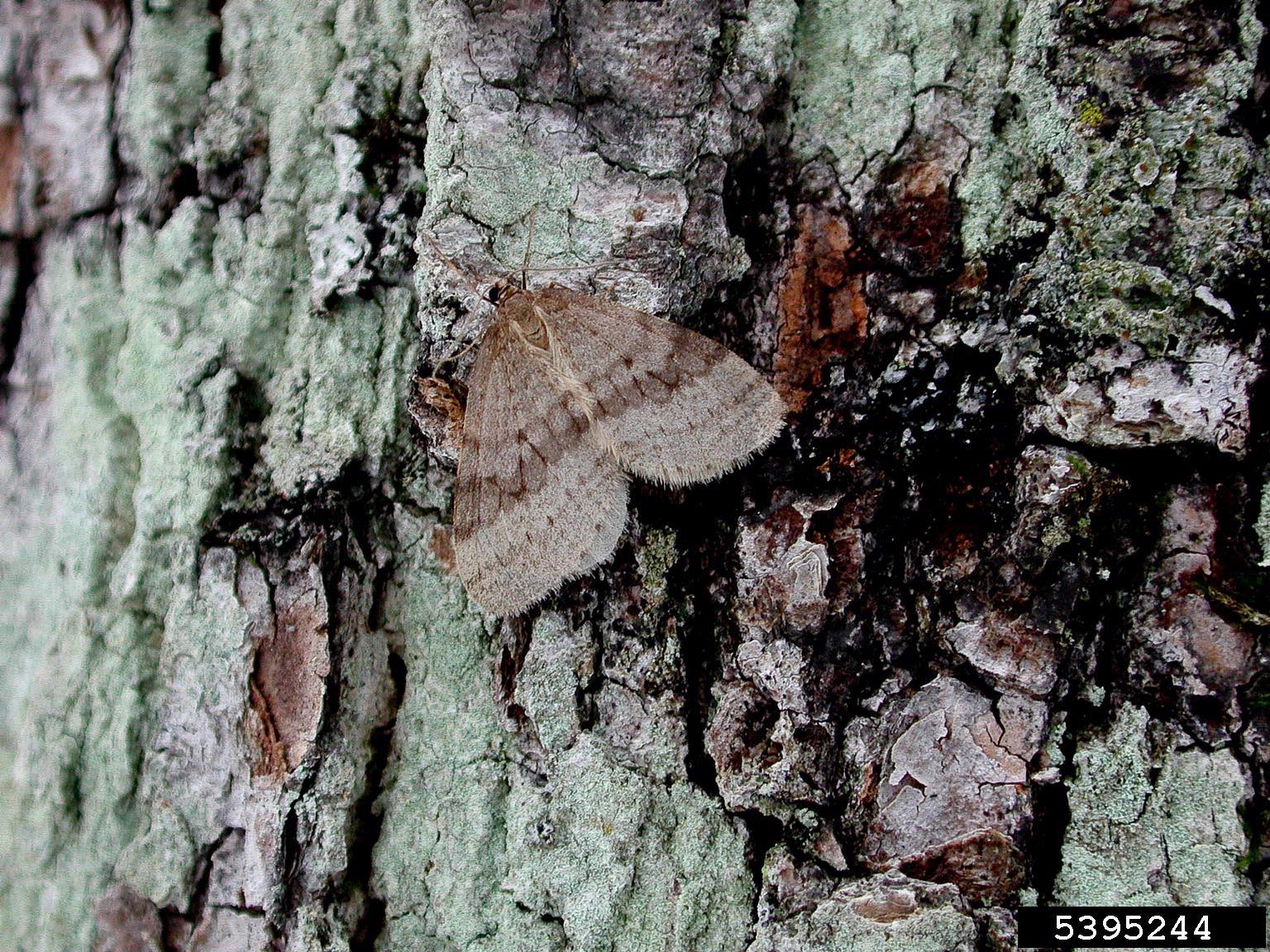
- Adult male

Scientific classification
- Kingdom: Animalia
- Phylum: Arthropoda
- Clade: Pancrustacea
- Class: Insecta
- Order: Lepidoptera
- Family: Geometridae
- Genus: Operophtera
- Species: O. bruceata

Binomial name
- Operophtera bruceata (Hulst, 1886)

Synonyms
- Operophtera groenlandica de Lesse, 1951; Operophtera bruceata hyperborea

= Operophtera bruceata =

Species of moth

Operophtera bruceata, the Bruce spanworm, hunter's moth, or native winter moth is a moth of the family Geometridae. The species was first described by George Duryea Hulst in 1886. It is found from coast to coast in southern Canada and the northern parts of the United States.

The wingspan of the males is 25–30 mm. Females have underdeveloped wings and do not fly. Adults are on wing from October to December.

The Bruce spanworm looks very similar and has a similar life cycle to the invasive congener winter moth (O. brumata). The Bruce spanworm is known to hybridize with the winter moth. The two species look almost identical to one another; however, they can be distinguished morphologically by comparing uncus shape or by using DNA analyses. The Bruce spanworm uses the same pheromone as the winter moth.

The larvae hatch in the early spring after overwintering as eggs. The neonates primarily feed on the buds and nearly unfurled leaves of sugar maple, American beech and trembling aspen. They have also been recorded on willow and various other deciduous trees. After feeding for a few weeks, the late instar caterpillars drop down to the soil and build an earthen cocoon. They pupate until the late fall or early winter when they emerge as adults.

Disease from viruses and microsporidia have been noted to effect the larvae and pupae of the Bruce spanworm. Virus infections by a nucleopolyhedrovirus (NPV) baculovirus was found to be low in Bruce spanworm populations collected in the northeast U.S. and was found to be related to but distinct from the NPV that was detected in the winter moth in the same region. However, collections for Bruce spanworm larvae from an outbreak population in Maine had high levels of infection by microsporidia.

== Gallery ==
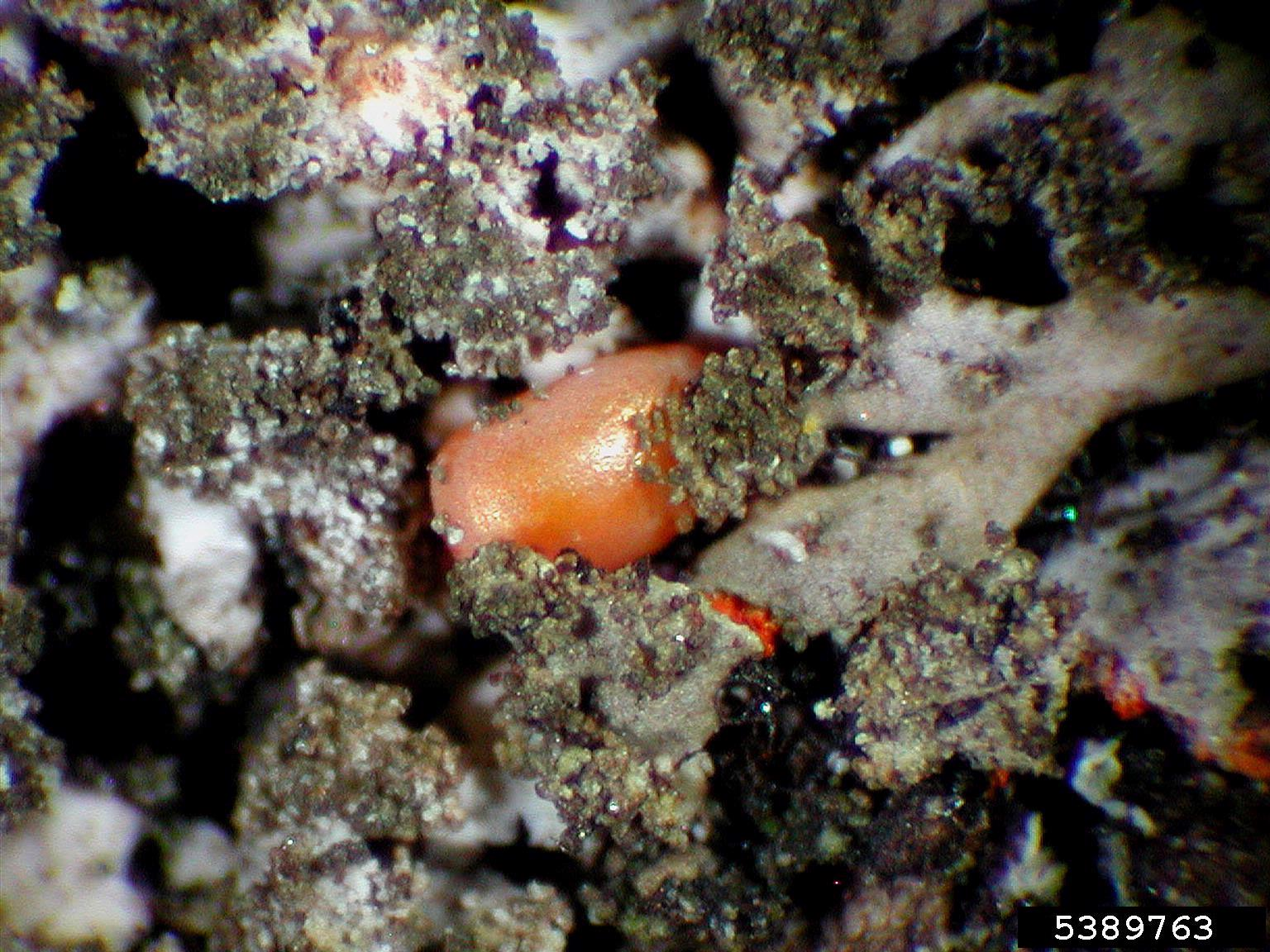
Egg

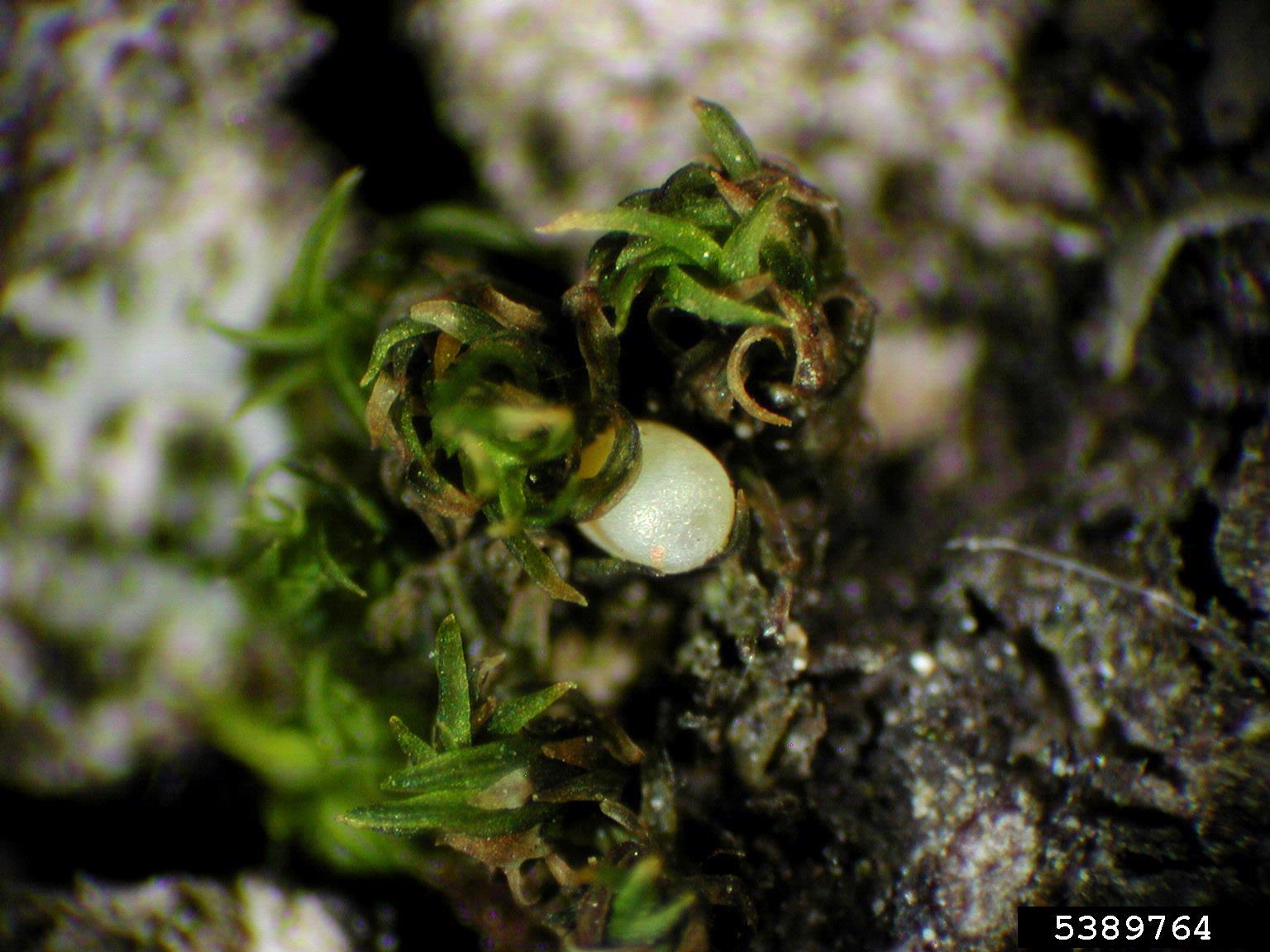
Egg

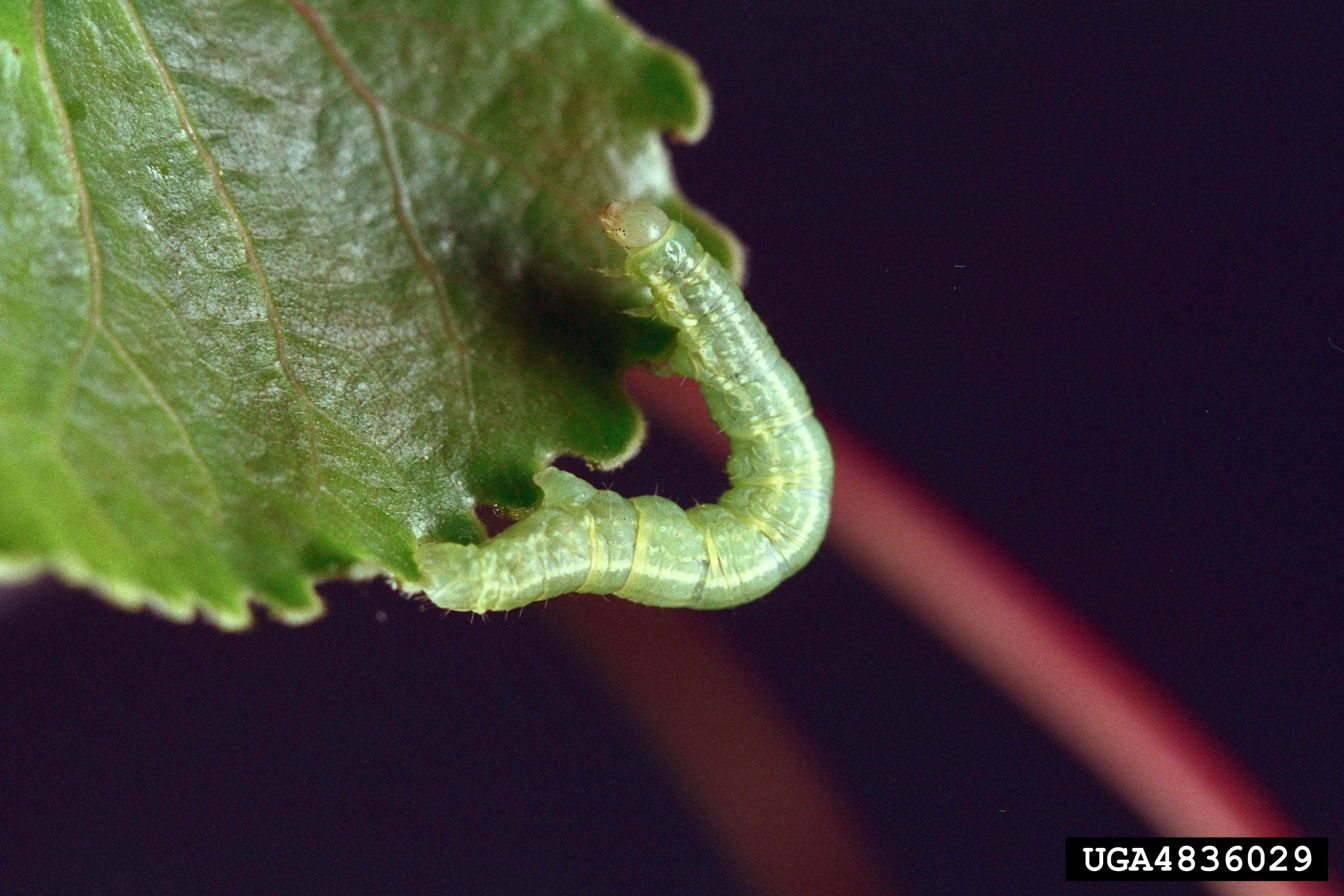
Larva

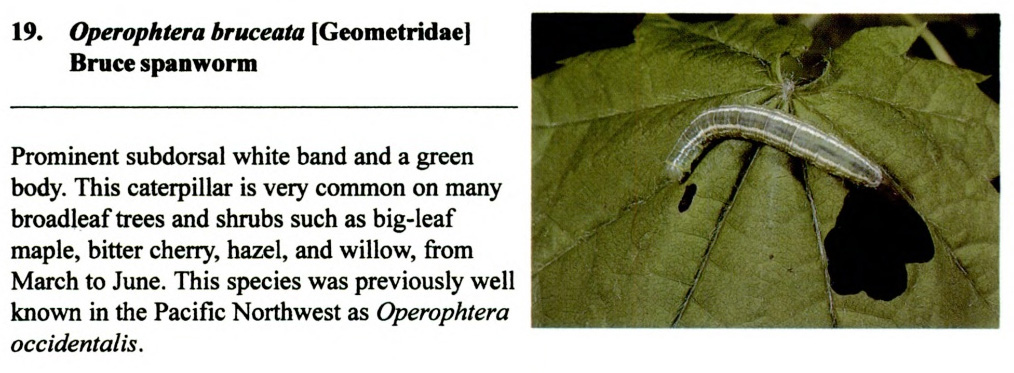
Caterpillar

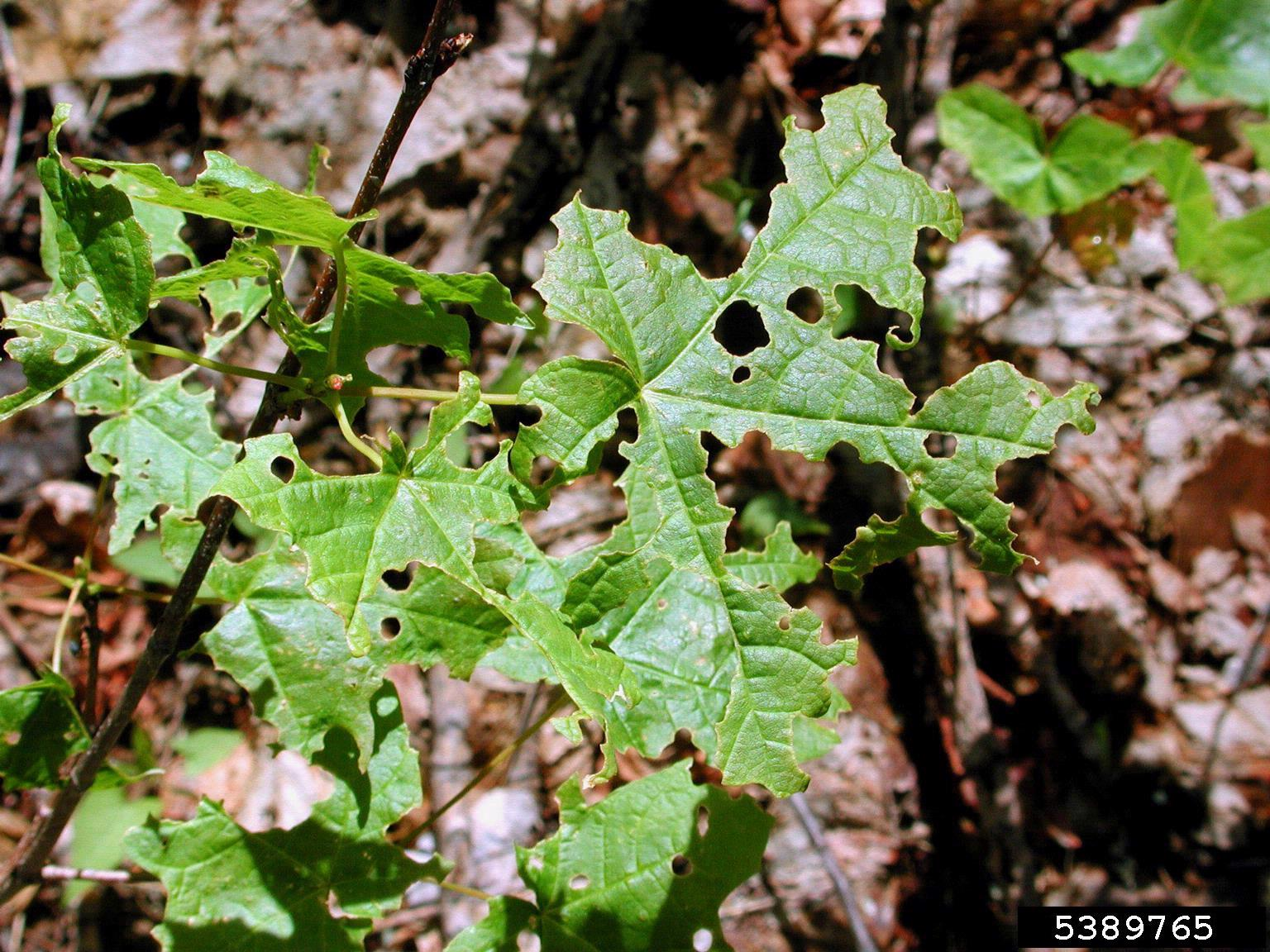
Feeding signs

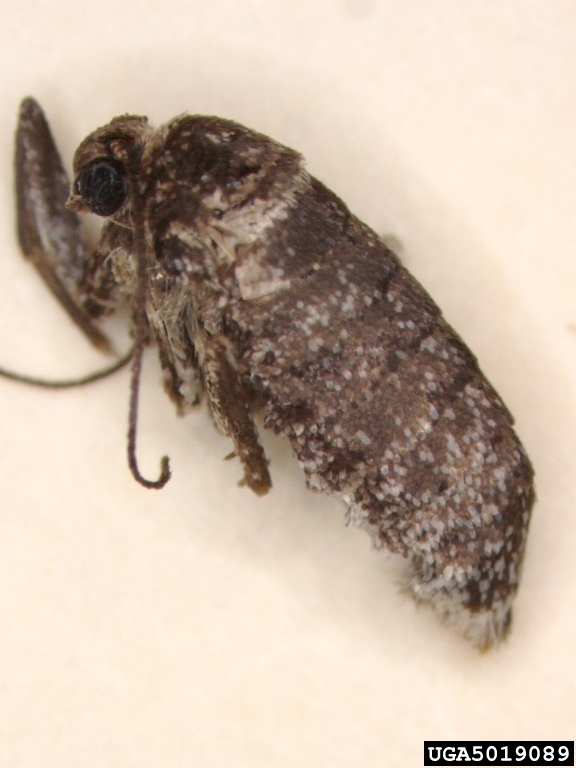
Adult female

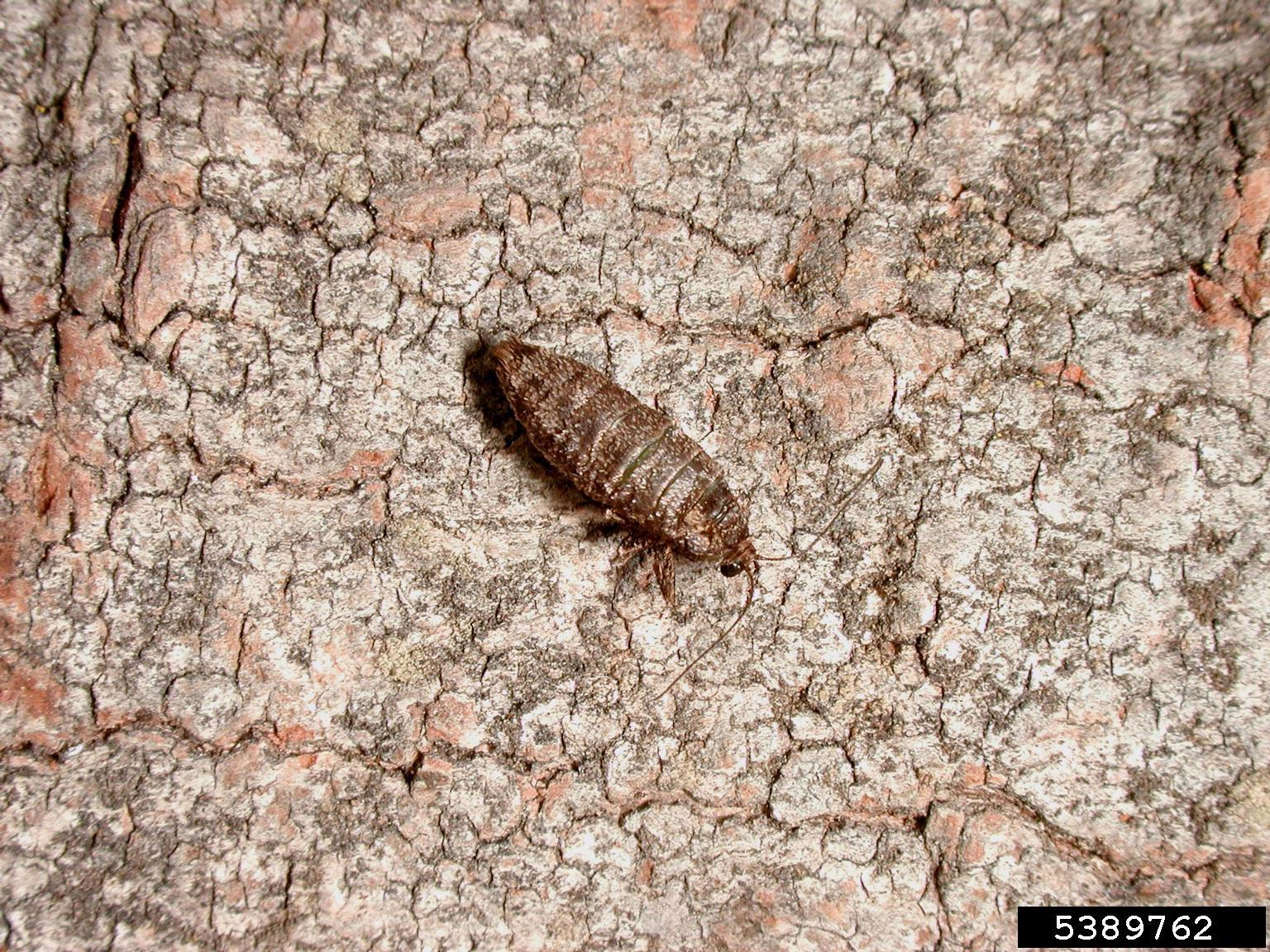
Adult female
