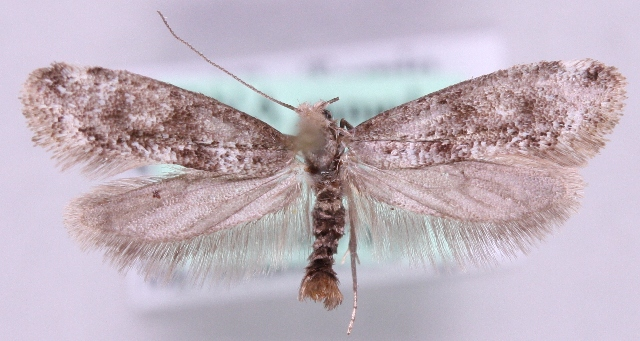

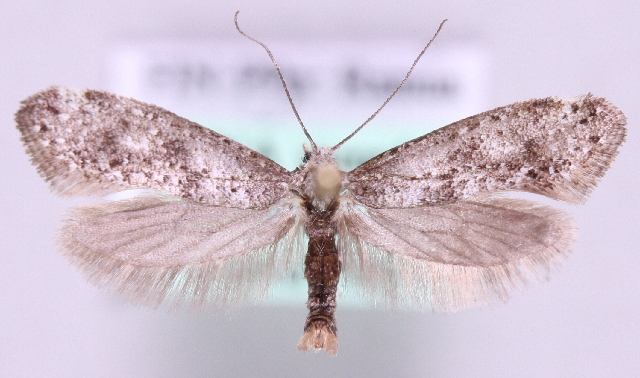

Scientific classification
- Domain: Eukaryota
- Kingdom: Animalia
- Phylum: Arthropoda
- Class: Insecta
- Order: Lepidoptera
- Family: Yponomeutidae
- Genus: Paraswammerdamia
- Species: P. lapponica

Binomial name
- Paraswammerdamia lapponica (W. Petersen, 1932)

Synonyms
- Swammerdamia lapponica W. Petersen, 1932

= Paraswammerdamia lapponica =

Species of moth

Paraswammerdamia lapponica is a moth of the family Yponomeutidae. It is found in Fennoscandia and northern Russia.

The wingspan is 13–15 mm. Adults are on wing from June to July.

The larvae feed on Betula nana.
