= Paraswammerdamia ornichella =

Scientific classification
- Domain: Eukaryota
- Kingdom: Animalia
- Phylum: Arthropoda
- Class: Insecta
- Order: Lepidoptera
- Family: Yponomeutidae
- Genus: Paraswammerdamia
- Species: P. ornichella

Binomial name
- Paraswammerdamia ornichella Friese, 1960

Species of moth

Paraswammerdamia ornichella is a moth of the family Yponomeutidae. It is found in Ukraine and Russia.
