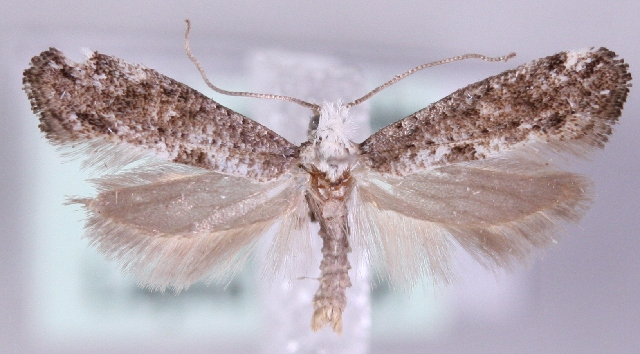

Scientific classification
- Kingdom: Animalia
- Phylum: Arthropoda
- Class: Insecta
- Order: Lepidoptera
- Family: Yponomeutidae
- Genus: Paraswammerdamia
- Species: P. albicapitella

Binomial name
- Paraswammerdamia albicapitella (Scharfenberg, 1805)

Synonyms
- Phalaena albicapitella Scharfenberg, 1805; Tinea spiniella Hübner, [1809]; Tinea caesiella Hübner, [1813] (not Hübner, 1796)

= Paraswammerdamia albicapitella =

Species of moth

Paraswammerdamia albicapitella is a moth of the family Yponomeutidae. It is found in most of Europe, except the western part of the Balkan Peninsula, Ukraine, Lithuania and Latvia. It was recently reported from Canada (British Columbia).

The wingspan is 10–13 mm. Adults are greyish with a white head and thorax. Thorax white, sometimes anteriorly fuscous-sprinkled. Forewings white, irregularly irrorated with fuscous; some longitudinal series of blackish dots; antemedian dark fuscous fascia reduced to two spots, discal and dorsal; two white spots on costa posteriorly, separated by a dark fuscous spot; cilia coppery-tinged, with two dark purplish-fuscous lines. Hindwings pale fuscous. Larva reddish-brown; dorsal line broad, paler, becoming indistinct posteriorly; spiracular broad, yellowish-white; head pale yellow-ochreous.

They are on wing in July.

The larvae feed on Prunus spinosa. They initially mine the leaves of their host plant.
