= Eastern Canary Islands chiffchaff =

Conservation status
- Extinct (1986?)

Scientific classification
- Kingdom: Animalia
- Phylum: Chordata
- Class: Aves
- Order: Passeriformes
- Family: Phylloscopidae
- Genus: Phylloscopus
- Species: P. canariensis
- Subspecies: †P. c. exsul

Trinomial name
- †Phylloscopus canariensis exsul (Hartert, 1907)

Synonyms
- Phylloscopus collybita exsul

Extinct subspecies of bird

The eastern Canary Islands chiffchaff or Lanzarote Island chiffchaff (Phylloscopus canariensis exsul) is an extinct subspecies of the Canary Islands chiffchaff endemic to the island of Lanzarote – and possibly also Fuerteventura – in the Canary Islands, Spain.

The eastern Canary Islands chiffchaff was more chestnut-backed and shorter-winged than the western Canary Islands chiffchaff, Phylloscopus canariensis canariensis. These birds were formerly considered subspecies of the common chiffchaff, but separated due to their morphological, bioacoustical, and mtDNA sequence differences.

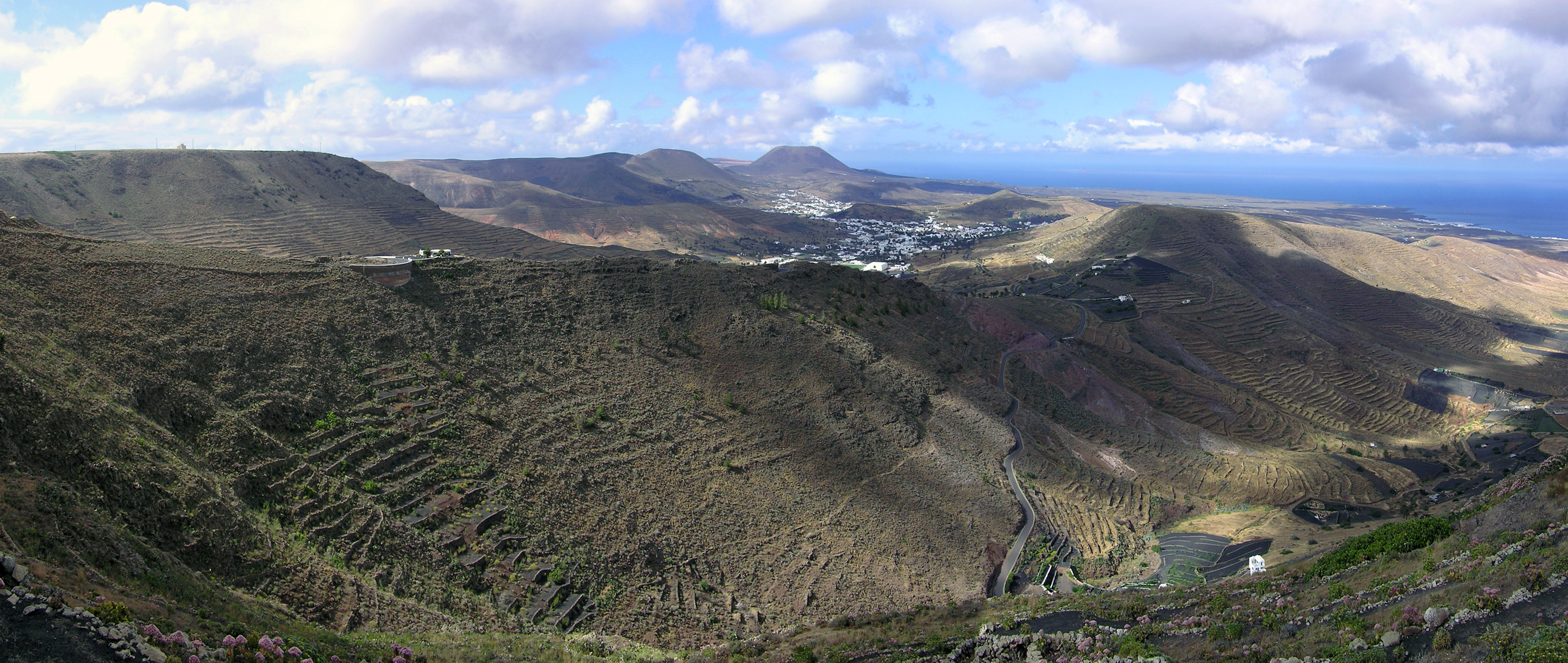
This photo shows most of the historic range of P. c. exsul; Haría is in the center. Note terraced slopes; virtually all natural tree and shrub cover has been cleared for agriculture.

Apparently this subspecies was already very rare at the moment of its description. A number of specimens were collected at the beginning of the 20th century in the valleys of Haría (Lanzarote). There it could be observed in broom thickets in the high and fresh zones. Since then there are only some doubtful records. The presence of this subspecies in Fuerteventura is merely hypothetical, as no specimen was ever collected there, nor are there reliable records from that island.

The cause of extinction is unknown. Perhaps its final disappearance is related to the destruction and/or transformation of the vegetation in the high zones of the Macizo de Famara.

== See also ==
- List of extinct birds
- List of extinct animals
- List of extinct animals of Europe
