= Georg Ludwig Scharfenberg =

German entomologist and pastor who studied forest insect pests

Georg Ludwig Scharfenberg (28 December 1746, Hümpfershausen - 2 December 1810, Ritschenhausen) was a German entomologist and a Lutheran pastor. He was the son of a teacher and was educated at the University of Halle. Scharfenberg published notes on insects in Journal für Liebhaber der Entomologie edited by Ludwig Gottlieb Scriba. He described Paraswammerdamia albicapitella, Operophtera fagata and Bucculatrix bechsteinella (with Bechstein).

== Works ==
- with Johann Matthäus Bechstein Vollständige Naturgeschichte der schädlichen Forstinsekten. Ein Handbuch für Forstmänner, Cameralisten und Oekonomen, Leipzig 1804
