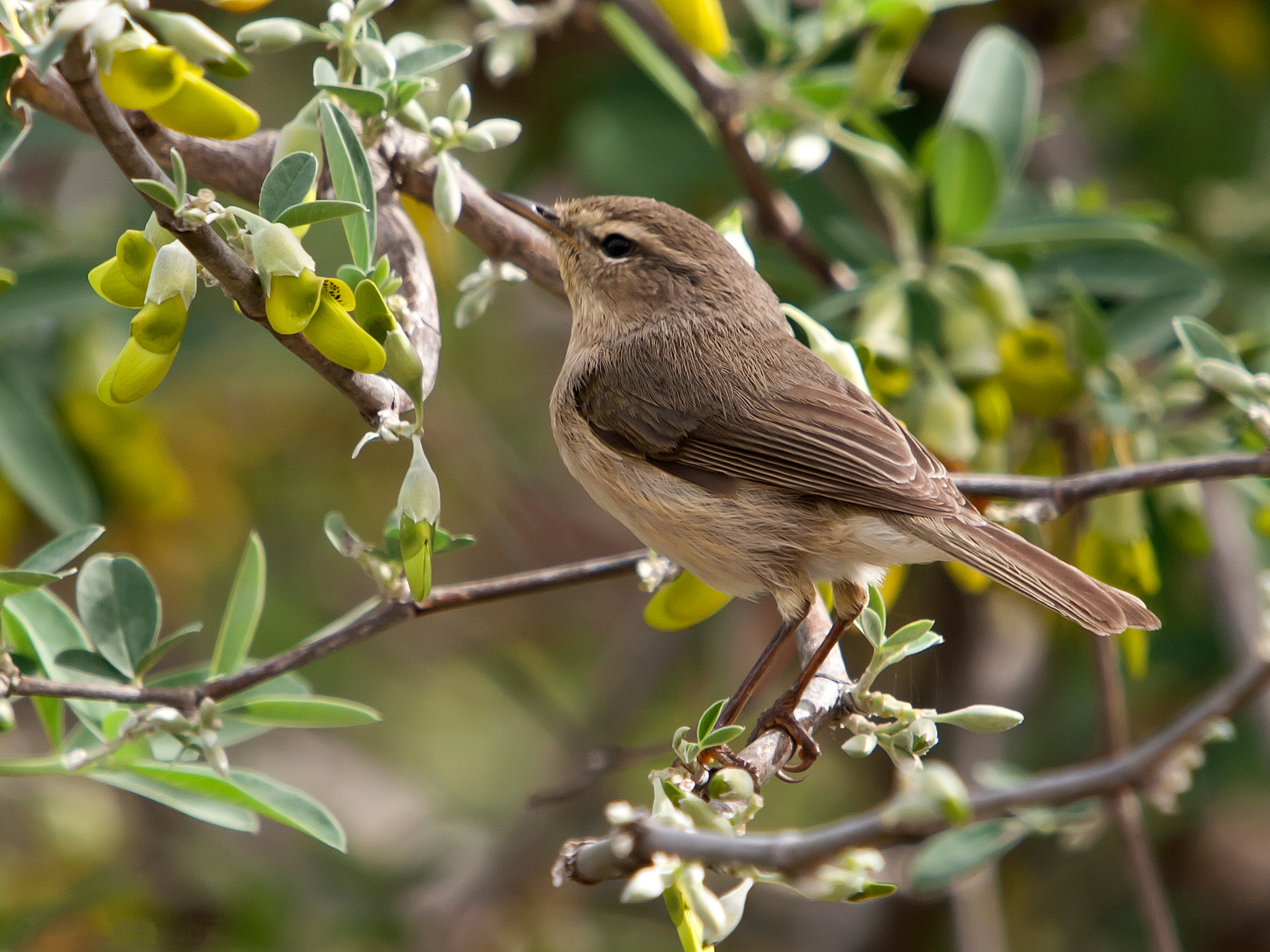

Scientific classification
- Domain: Eukaryota
- Kingdom: Animalia
- Phylum: Chordata
- Class: Aves
- Order: Passeriformes
- Family: Phylloscopidae
- Genus: Phylloscopus
- Species: P. canariensis
- Subspecies: P. c. canariensis

Trinomial name
- Phylloscopus canariensis canariensis (Hartwig, 1886)

Synonyms
- Phylloscopus collybita canariensis

= Western Canary Islands chiffchaff =

Subspecies of bird

The western Canary Islands chiffchaff (Phylloscopus canariensis canariensis) is a small bird in the family Phylloscopidae. It is a subspecies of the Canary Islands chiffchaff found on the islands of El Hierro, La Palma, La Gomera, Tenerife and Gran Canaria in the Canary Islands, Spain.

Both the western and the now extinct eastern (Phylloscopus canariensis exsul) subspecies of the Canary Islands chiffchaff were formerly considered subspecies of the common chiffchaff but were separated (Clement & Helbig, 1998; Sangster et al., 2001) due to their morphological, bioacoustical, and mtDNA sequence differences (Helbig et al., 1996).
