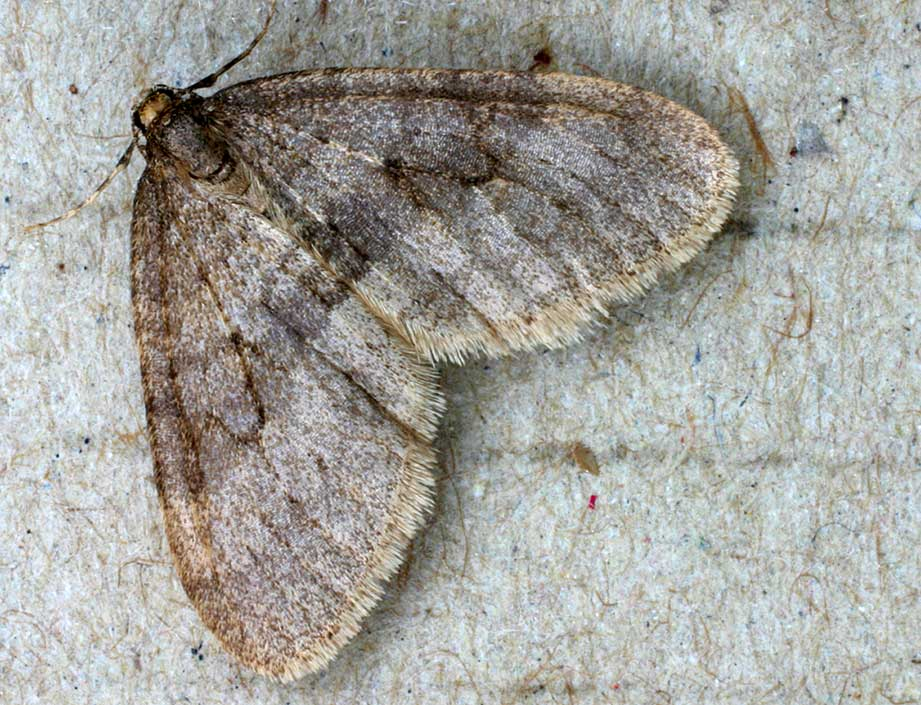

Scientific classification
- Kingdom: Animalia
- Phylum: Arthropoda
- Clade: Pancrustacea
- Class: Insecta
- Order: Lepidoptera
- Family: Geometridae
- Genus: Operophtera
- Species: O. brumata

Binomial name
- Operophtera brumata (Linnaeus, 1758)

Synonyms
- Cheimatobia brumata L. Chimatobia brumata Phalaena brumata L.

= Winter moth =

Species of moth

The winter moth (Operophtera brumata) is a moth of the family Geometridae. It is an abundant species in Europe and the Near East and a famous study organism for evaluating insect population dynamics. It is one of very few lepidopterans of temperate regions in which adults are active in late autumn and early winter. The females of this species are virtually wingless and cannot fly, but the males are fully winged and fly strongly. After the initial frosts of late fall, the females emerge from their pupae, walk to and up trees and emit pheromones in the evening to attract males. After fertilization, they ascend to lay, on average, around 100 eggs each. Typically, the larger the female moth is, the more eggs she lays.

The winter moth is considered an invasive species in North America. Nova Scotia, Canada, experienced the first confirmed infestations in the 1930s. It was later accidentally introduced to Oregon in the 1950s and the Vancouver area of British Columbia around 1970. Defoliation by the moth was first noted in eastern states of the United States in the late 1990s, and is now well established in Massachusetts, Rhode Island, New Hampshire and Maine. The winter moth is confirmed present in British Columbia, Washington and Oregon. In Massachusetts, the moths have attracted the attention of several media outlets due to the severity of the infestation. Efforts at biological control are underway.

== Description ==
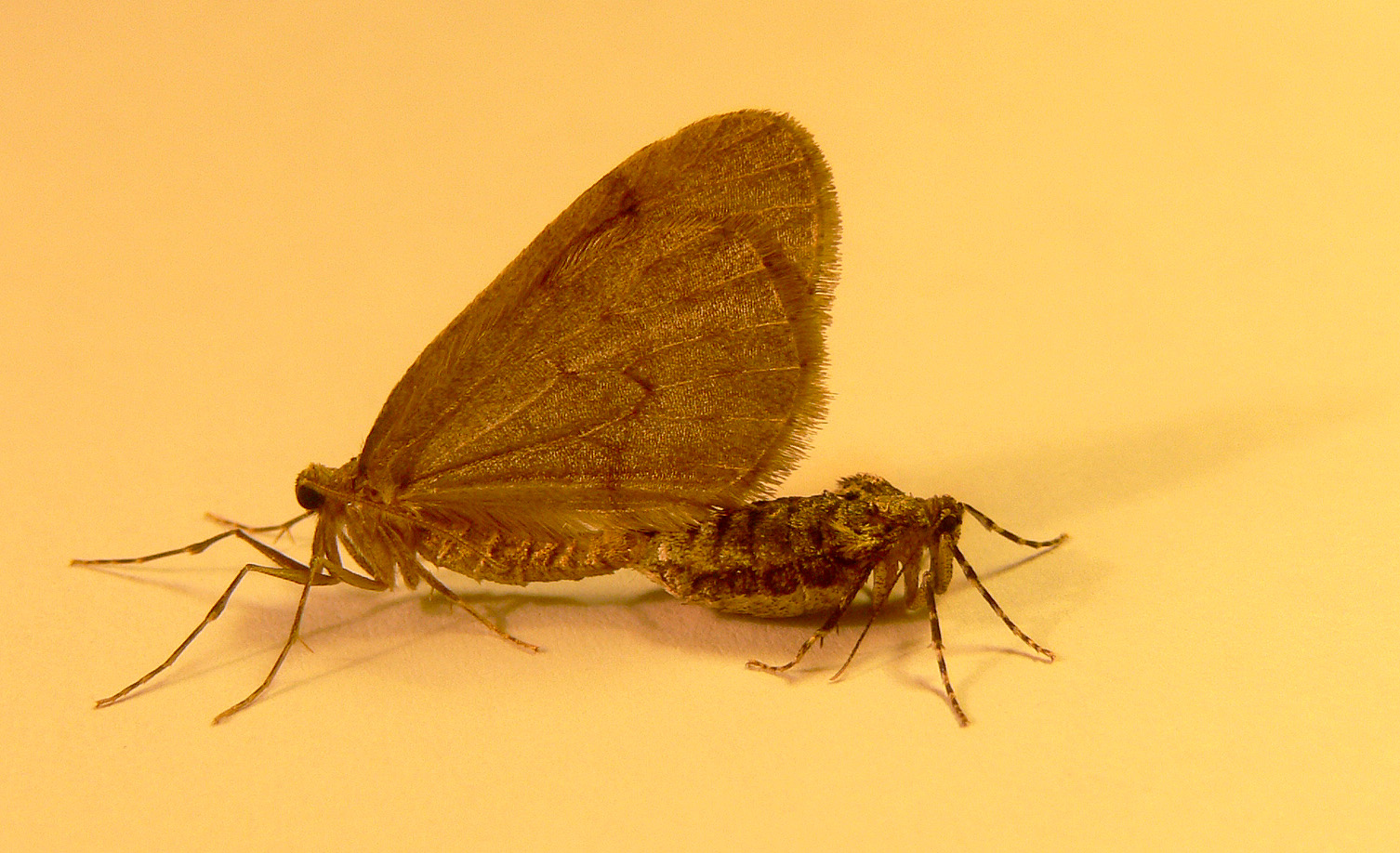
Mating. Males prefer larger females (more eggs).

The forewing ground colour of the winged males varies from grey-yellow to beige-brown or occasionally slightly reddish-tinted. The patterns are often band-shaped dark brownish, often indistinct. The fringe is yellowish. The hindwings are pale grey or yellow grey. The antennae are short and finely hairy. The female appears completely wingless, but in fact female winter moths have greatly reduced wings. The flightless female has a brownish-grey body with rudimentary wing stubs that are brown to grey and have dark bands. Body length for both sexes is approximately 1 cm (0.4 in). Larvae are 0.1 inches (2.5 mm) in length after hatching and will grow to 0.75 inches (19 mm) over a six-week period. In North America, the winter moth can be confused with the related native species, the Bruce spanworm (Operophtera bruceata). In fact, the two species hybridize.

== Distribution ==
It is native to Northern and Central Europe; in the south, its range extends to Northern Italy; in the east to the Caucasus and Asia Minor; in the north to the Baltics. The genetic populations of the winter moth in Europe are a result of recolonization following the last glacial period. As an invasive species, this moth is found in Nova Scotia, coastal New England (Massachusetts, Maine, Rhode Island, Connecticut, and New York) and also the Pacific northwest (including Vancouver Island). In New England, expansion inland and north appears to be curtailed by cold winter temperatures, so for example, coastal Maine but not inland. Locally milder winters, as part of global climate change, may be allowing expansion of afflicted territory. A study conducted in Massachusetts documented that winter moth defoliation reduced the annual trunk diameter growth rate of oak trees by an average of 47% while not significantly impacting growth rates of the less defoliated maple trees.

== Life cycle ==
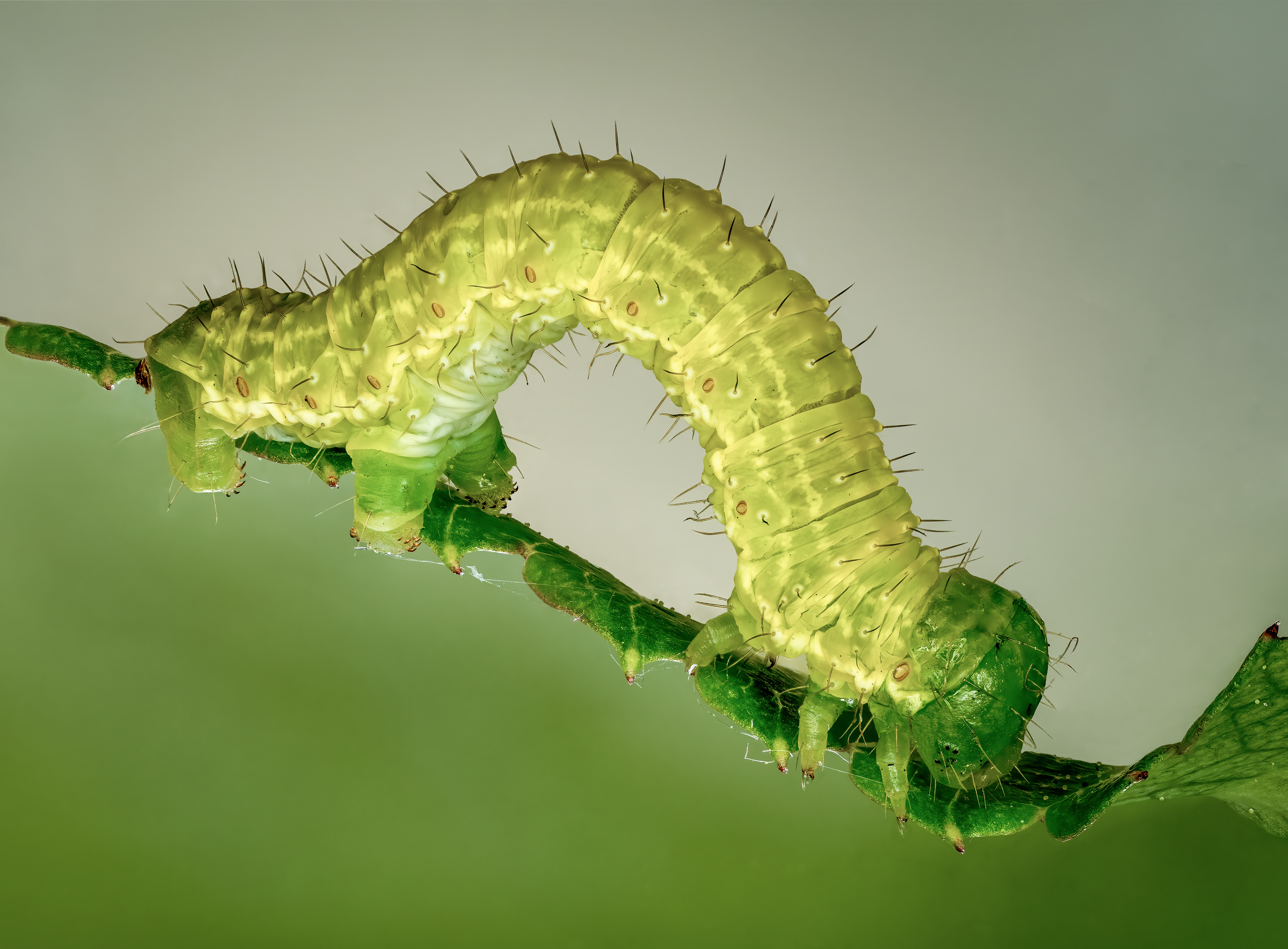
Caterpillar will reach length of about 0.75 inches

Winter moth larvae (caterpillars) emerge in early spring from egg masses laid near leaf buds after a series of days in which the daytime high temperatures reach around 10 °C (50 °F). Recently hatched larvae feed on expanding leaf buds, often after having burrowed inside the bud, and later on foliage, for approximately six weeks. In addition to feeding on the tree where they hatched, young larvae will also produce silk strands to 'balloon' (be wind-blown) to other trees. By mid-May the larvae, green in color and about an inch long, descend to the ground. Very little mortality due to disease has been noted in winter moth larvae in North America.

Pupation occurs in the soil in late May. Adults emerge from the soil in mid-late November. The female winter moths are flightless but release a sex pheromone to attract males. After mating, the female lays between 150 and 350 tiny eggs in bark crevices, on branches, in lichen, and under bark scales. With such a long pupal period, the winter moth is vulnerable to numerous pupal predators and parasitoids.

Research conducted in the Netherlands indicated that as climate warming is causing spring temperatures to become warmer sooner, some of the winter moth eggs were hatching before tree leaf buds – first food for the caterpillars – had begun to open. Early hatchlings starved. Late hatchlings survived. Because hatch timing is genetically controlled, the moths are evolving to resynchronize with bud opening by delaying the response to the temperature trigger by 5 to 10 days. The larvae, like the adults, can withstand below freezing temperatures at night. Larval dispersal is the dominant source of density-dependent larval mortality and likely regulates high density population dynamics of winter moth in New England. Larvae prefer oak and apple, but also feed on maple, birch, hornbeam, chestnut, hazel, quince, beech, larch, poplar, cherry, pear, rose, raspberry, blueberry, willow, elm, and other leafy trees and shrubs.

== Invasive impact ==
The winter moth is native to Europe, but invaded the northeast of the US in the late 1990s. As of 2007, winter moths have spread to coastal Maine, eastern Massachusetts, Rhode Island, southeastern Connecticut, and eastern Long Island. Beginning in 2005, entomologists at the University of Massachusetts Amherst introduced the specialist parasitoid fly Cyzenis albicans as a classical biological control agent, establishing it at 41 of 44 release sites from southeastern Connecticut to coastal Maine by 2020. By 2016, winter moth densities at monitored New England sites had fallen by an average of 98%, coinciding with the onset of parasitism by C. albicans, and defoliation in Massachusetts has been undetectable by aerial survey since 2016. The moths feed on a wide range of deciduous leaves, and some conifers. This has caused defoliation of the trees across the states in which the moths live. Between 2003 and 2015 winter moths caused defoliation of forests and shade trees from between 2,266 and 36,360 hectares per year in Massachusetts alone.

== Biological control ==
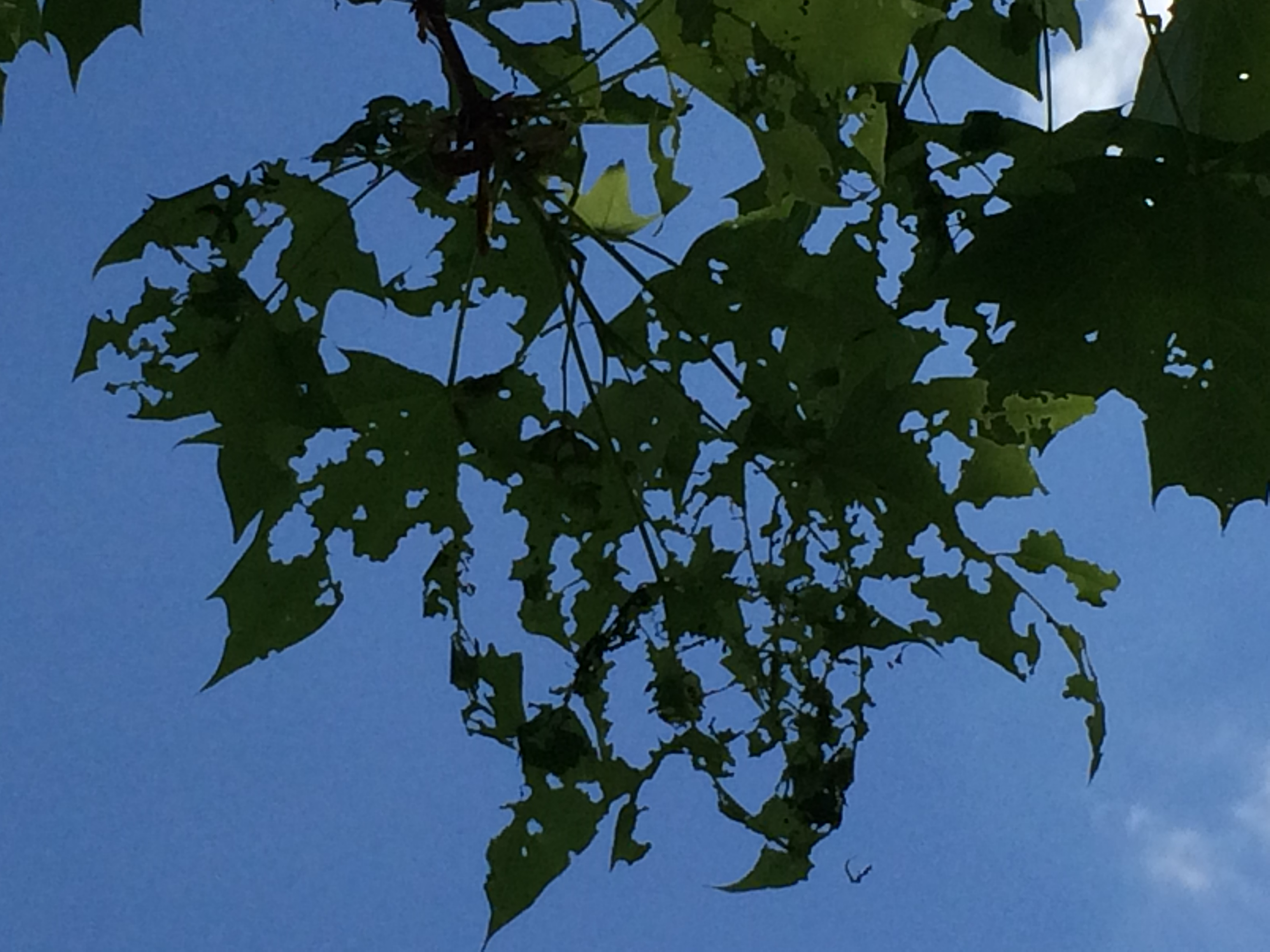
Maple tree leaves showing damage by winter moth larvae

In Europe, where winter moths are native, two parasitic species, a wasp (Agrypon flaveolatum) and a fly (Cyzenis albicans) prey on winter moth caterpillars. The wasps insert eggs into the larvae. The flies lay eggs on leaves, which the larvae then ingest when eating the leaves. As a biological control, the wasp was introduced in Canada but is not being pursued in the United States because there is not sufficient evidence that the wasp would not lay eggs in larvae of other moth species. Introduction of C. albicans, which is species-specific to preying on winter moths, has proven successful in strongly reducing, although not eliminating, winter moth infestation in Nova Scotia. Test introductions were begun in eastern Massachusetts in 2005. This proved successful, so more fly releases have taken place at sites from southeast Connecticut to coastal Maine. As moth densities can reach ten million larvae per acre, several years are needed before parasitism by the flies reaches 20–50%. Once this is achieved the winter moth density will decline and leaf defoliation will be reduced to levels not as harmful to the trees. The delay in establishment is likely the result of heavy mortality from predators and hyperparasitoids on the pupating C. albicans. Management of the winter moth in Massachusetts using biological control with C. albicans is showing positive results.

There are different ways to successfully control the winter moth population depending on the time of year. During the late fall and early winter, a dormant oil spray can be used to suffocate the eggs. When the eggs are newly hatched in late March and early April Bt (Bacillus thuringiensis) is a safe and effective way to control caterpillars. As the caterpillars get bigger, spinosad is also effective.
