= Johann Matthäus Bechstein =

German naturalist, forester, ornithologist, entomologist and herpetologist

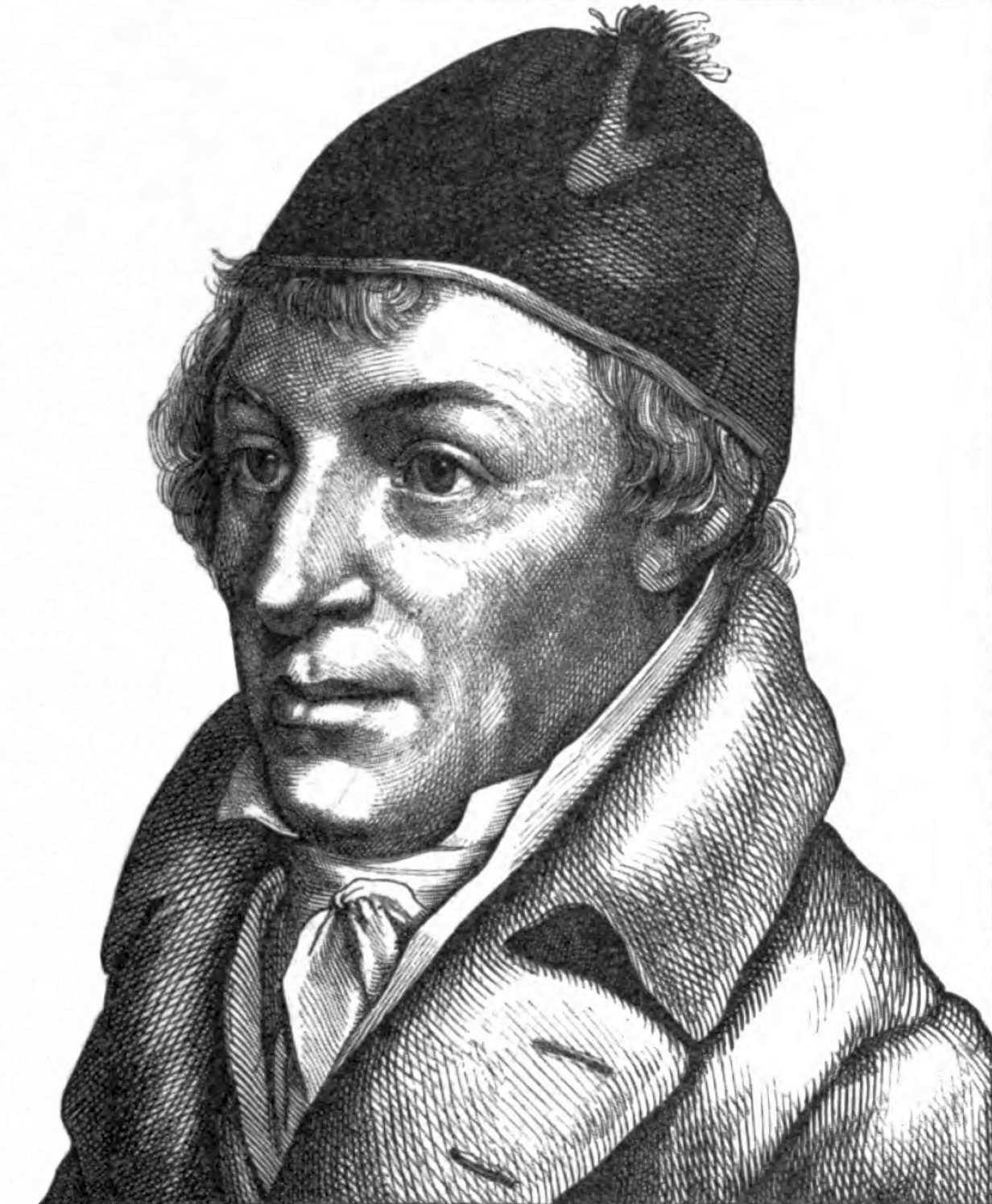
- Born: 11 July 1757; Gotha, Thuringia. Germany
- Died: 23 February 1822 (aged 64)
- Education: University of Jena
- Known for: Natural History of Cage Birds, 1795
- Children: Ludwig Bechstein (nephew and adopted son)
- Scientific career
- Fields: Naturalist, ornithology, herpetology
- Workplaces: Forestry school at Dreissigacker near Meiningen
- Patrons: Duke of Saxe-Meiningen
- Author abbrev. (botany): Bechst.

Johann Matthäus Bechstein (German pronunciation: [ˈjoːhan maˈtɛːʊs ˈbɛçʃtaɪn]; 11 July 1757 – 23 February 1822) was a German naturalist, forester, ornithologist, entomologist, and herpetologist. In Great Britain, he was known for his treatise on singing birds (Naturgeschichte der Stubenvögel, Natural History of Cage Birds, 1795).

== Biography ==
Bechstein was born in Waltershausen in the district of Gotha in Thuringia. He studied theology for four years at the University of Jena, and spent time hunting and roaming the forests as opportunities permitted. After leaving school, he taught for some years, but gave teaching up to devote himself to outdoor pursuits. In 1795, he founded the school of forestry at Waltershausen, and in 1800, the Duke of Saxe-Meiningen made him the director of the forestry school at Dreissigacker near Meiningen in the neighbouring district of Schmalkalden-Meiningen. After the death of his own son, Bechstein adopted his nephew Ludwig Bechstein.

Bechstein was a prolific zoologist and one of the first concerned with wildlife conservation; besides his ornithological work, he also published works calling for the protection of animals that were commonly considered harmful or pests at the time, such as bats. Bechstein's bat was named in his honour.

== Partial list of publications ==
- Gemeinnützige Naturgeschichte Deutschlands nach allen drey Reichen. 4 vols. Leipzig 1789–95; 2nd ed. 1801–09.
- Johann Lathams Allgemeine Übersicht der Vögel 1791–1812.
- Kurze aber gründliche Musterung aller bisher mit Recht oder Unrecht von dem Jäger als schädlich geachteten und getödteten Thiere, nebst Aufzählung einiger wirklich schädlichen, die er, seinem Berufe nach, nicht dafür erkennt, ... Ettinger, Gotha 1792–1805.
- Kurzgefasste gemeinnützige Naturgeschichte 1792–97.
- Naturgeschichte der Stubenvögel. Ettinger, Gotha 1795; 4th ed. Halle 1840.
- Naturgeschichte der Stubenthiere. Ettinger, Gotha 1797.
- Herrn De la Cepede's Naturgeschichte der Amphibien oder der enerlegenden vierfüssingen Thiere und der Schlangen. Eine Fortsetzung von Buffon's Naturgeschichte aus dem Französischen übersetz und mit Anmerkungen und zusätzen versehen. 5 volumes. Industrie Comptoir. Weimar 1800.
- Ornithologisches Taschenbuch von und für Deutschland oder Kurze Beschreibung aller Vögel Deutschlands für Liebhaber dieses Theils der Naturgeschichte. Richter, Leipzig 1802.
- Naturgeschichte der schädlichen Waldinsecten. Monath & Kußler, Nürnberg 1798–1800.
- Diana oder Gesellschaftsschrift zur Erweiterung und Berichtigung der Natur-, Forst- und Jagdkunde. Waltershausen 1797–1816.
- Ornithologisches Taschenbuch 1802–1803.
- Vollständige Naturgeschichte der schädlichen Forstinsekten: ein Handbuch für Forstmänner, Cameralisten und Dekonomen [in collaboration with Georg Ludwig Scharfenberg], Leipzig 1804–1805.
- Die Forst- und Jagdwissenschaft nach allen ihren Theilen für angehende und ausübende Forstmänner und Jäger. Gotha, Erfurt 1818–35.
- with Georg Ludwig Scharfenberg Vollständige Naturgeschichte der schädlichen Forstinsekten : ein Handbuch für Forstmänner, Cameralisten und Dekonomen 1804
