= Tsondol =

Coordinates: 41°53′30″N 101°06′33″E

Location in Inner Mongolia

Tsondol is a locality on the Etsin Col River in the west of Inner Mongolia. It is the type locality for the relict gull, a specimen of which was collected by Sven Hedin's expedition team on 24 April 1929.
