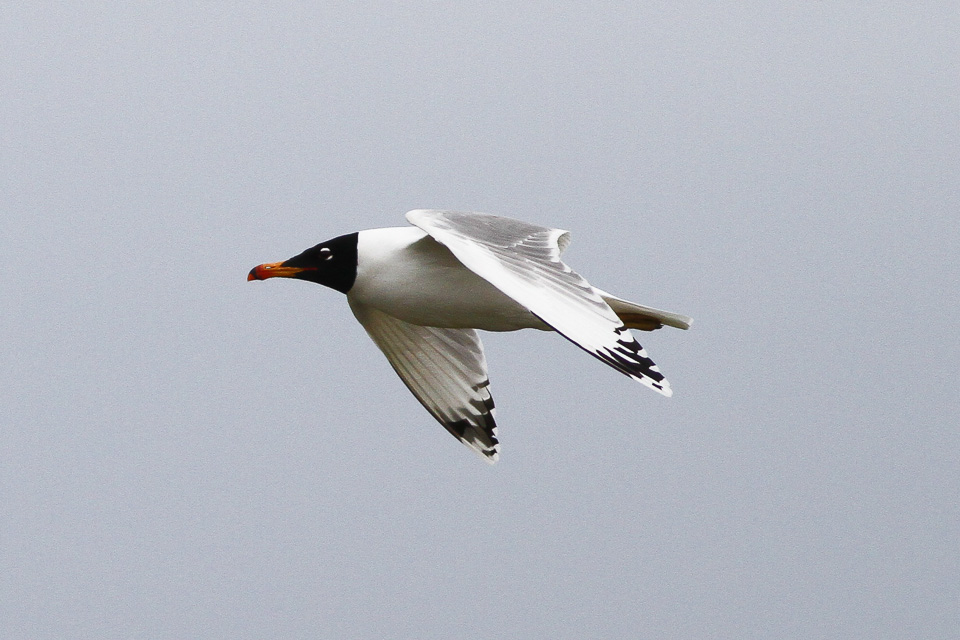
- Ichthyaetus ichthyaetus

Scientific classification
- Kingdom: Animalia
- Phylum: Chordata
- Class: Aves
- Order: Charadriiformes
- Family: Laridae
- Subfamily: Larinae
- Genus: Ichthyaetus; Kaup, 1829

Type species
- Larus ichthyaetus (Pallas, 1773)

Species
- See text

= Ichthyaetus =

Genus of birds

Ichthyaetus is a genus of gulls in the order Charadriiformes. The genus name comes from Ancient Greek ἰχθύς (ikhthús), meaning "fish", and ἀετός (aetós), meaning "eagle", and thus, "fish eagle". They were previously included in the genus Larus.

== Species ==
Genus Ichthyaetus – Kaup, 1829 – six species
Common name	Scientific name and subspecies	Range	Size and ecology	IUCN status and estimated population
Sooty gull	Ichthyaetus hemprichii (Bruch, 1855)	Bahrain, Djibouti, Egypt, Eritrea, India, Iran, Israel, Jordan, Kenya, Lebanon, Maldives, Mozambique, Oman, Pakistan, Qatar, Saudi Arabia, Somalia, Sri Lanka, Sudan, Tanzania, United Arab Emirates, and Yemen.	Size: Habitat: Diet:	LC
Great black-headed (or Pallas's) gull	Ichthyaetus ichthyaetus (Pallas, 1773)	Breeds in Central Asia and Ukraine, winters in Arabia and India.	Size: Habitat: Diet:	LC
Audouin's gull	Ichthyaetus audouinii (Payraudeau, 1826)	Mediterranean and the western coast of Saharan Africa and the Iberian peninsula	Size: Habitat: Diet:	VU
Mediterranean gull	Ichthyaetus melanocephalus (Temminck, 1820)	the Black Sea and the eastern Mediterranean this species has now expanded over most of Europe as far as Great Britain and Ireland	Size: Habitat: Diet:	LC
Relict gull	Ichthyaetus relictus (Lönnberg, 1931)	Mongolia, two in Kazakhstan, one in Russia, and one in China (Lake Hongjiannao)	Size: Habitat: Diet:	VU
White-eyed gull	Ichthyaetus leucophthalmus (Temminck, 1825)	Throughout Red Sea	Size: Habitat: Diet:	LC
