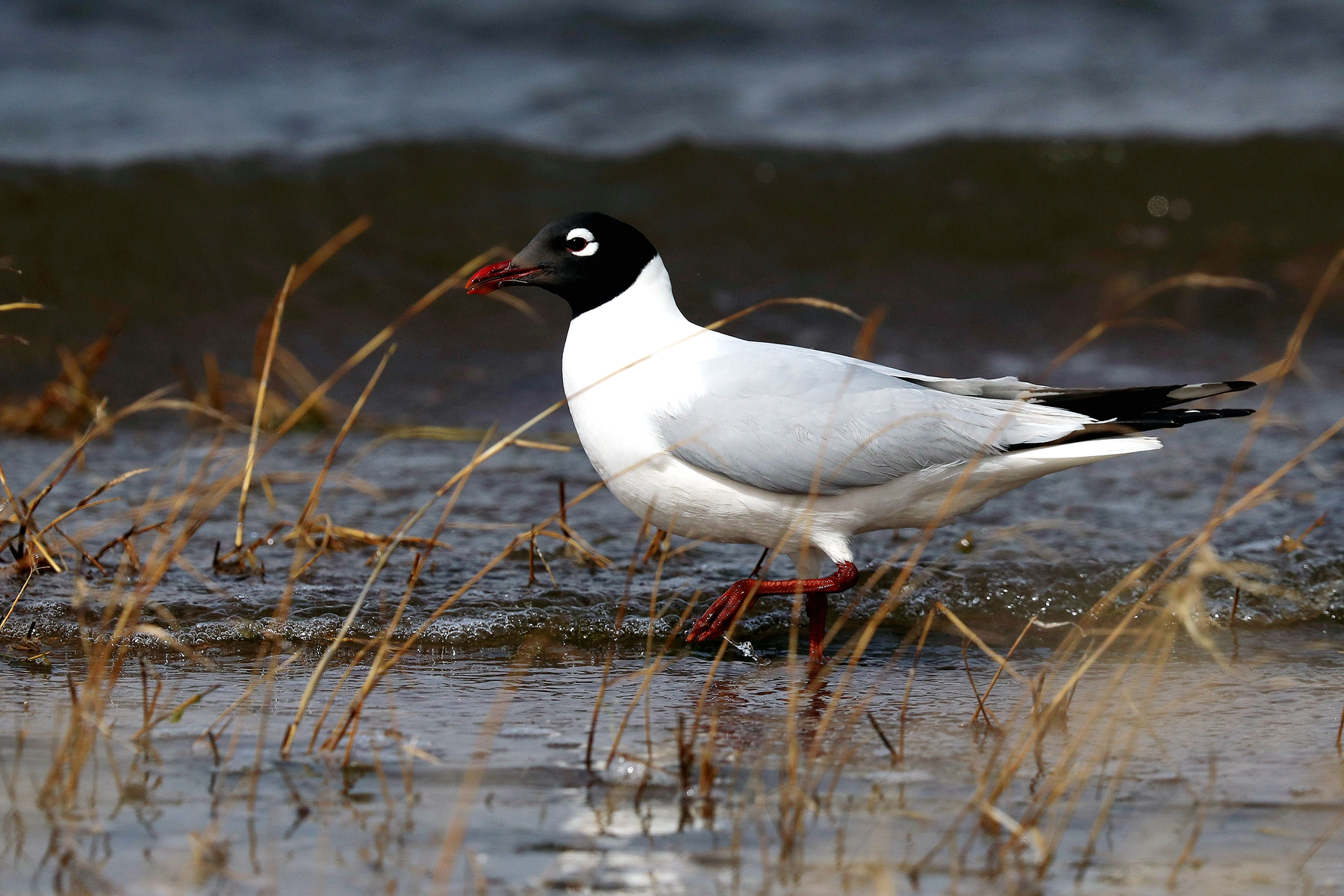

Conservation status
- Vulnerable (IUCN 3.1)
- CITES Appendix I (CITES)

Scientific classification
- Kingdom: Animalia
- Phylum: Chordata
- Class: Aves
- Order: Charadriiformes
- Family: Laridae
- Genus: Ichthyaetus
- Species: I. relictus

Binomial name
- Ichthyaetus relictus (Lönnberg, 1931)

Synonyms
- Larus relictus Lönnberg, 1931

= Relict gull =

Species of bird

The relict gull or Central Asian gull (Ichthyaetus relictus) is a medium-sized gull. It was believed to be an eastern race of the Mediterranean gull until 1971 and was traditionally placed in the genus Larus.

== Description ==
The gull is 44 to 45 cm long with a stocky, thick body. Non-breeding adults feature uniformly dark-smudged ear-coverts and hind crown, white-tipped wings, prominent, isolated black subterminal markings on outer primaries, and no white leading edge to outer wing. Breeding birds have black hoods (including napes) with grey-brown foreheads, and broad, white, half-moon colouring behind, below, and above their eyes. Their legs are orange and their bills scarlet. The name comes from its status as a relict species.

== Distribution and habitat ==
The gull breeds in several locations in Mongolia (e.g., Galuut Lake, Khukh Lake, and Chukh Lake), two in Kazakhstan, one in Russia, and one in China (Lake Hongjiannao). Small numbers appear to migrate to South Korea during the nonbreeding period. There is additional evidence that larger numbers may migrate to eastern China as well, but this is not verified.

The gulls breed starting in early June and going through early August in colonies on islands in saltwater lakes. These sites are fragile. Nesting does not occur when lakes dry up or when water levels are too high. When islands become too small or overgrown with vegetation or so large that they join at the shore, the birds do not nest either. During non-breeding periods, the birds can be found on estuarine mud and sandflats.

== Status and conservation ==
The population is estimated to be at 10,000 or fewer, with numbers dropping. It is classified as "vulnerable" on the IUCN Red List. Its greatest threats are changes of water level in the breeding lakes, predation from other gulls, hailstorms and flooding. Human disturbance has increased their vulnerability to all these factors, resulting in further risks for the adult gulls and increased mortality for chicks and eggs. They are also experiencing trouble migrating to breeding grounds due to the lack of useable stopover locations. In order to combat this, nature reserves in Mongolia, Kazakhstan, and Russia have been established, for example in the Mongol Daguur region.
