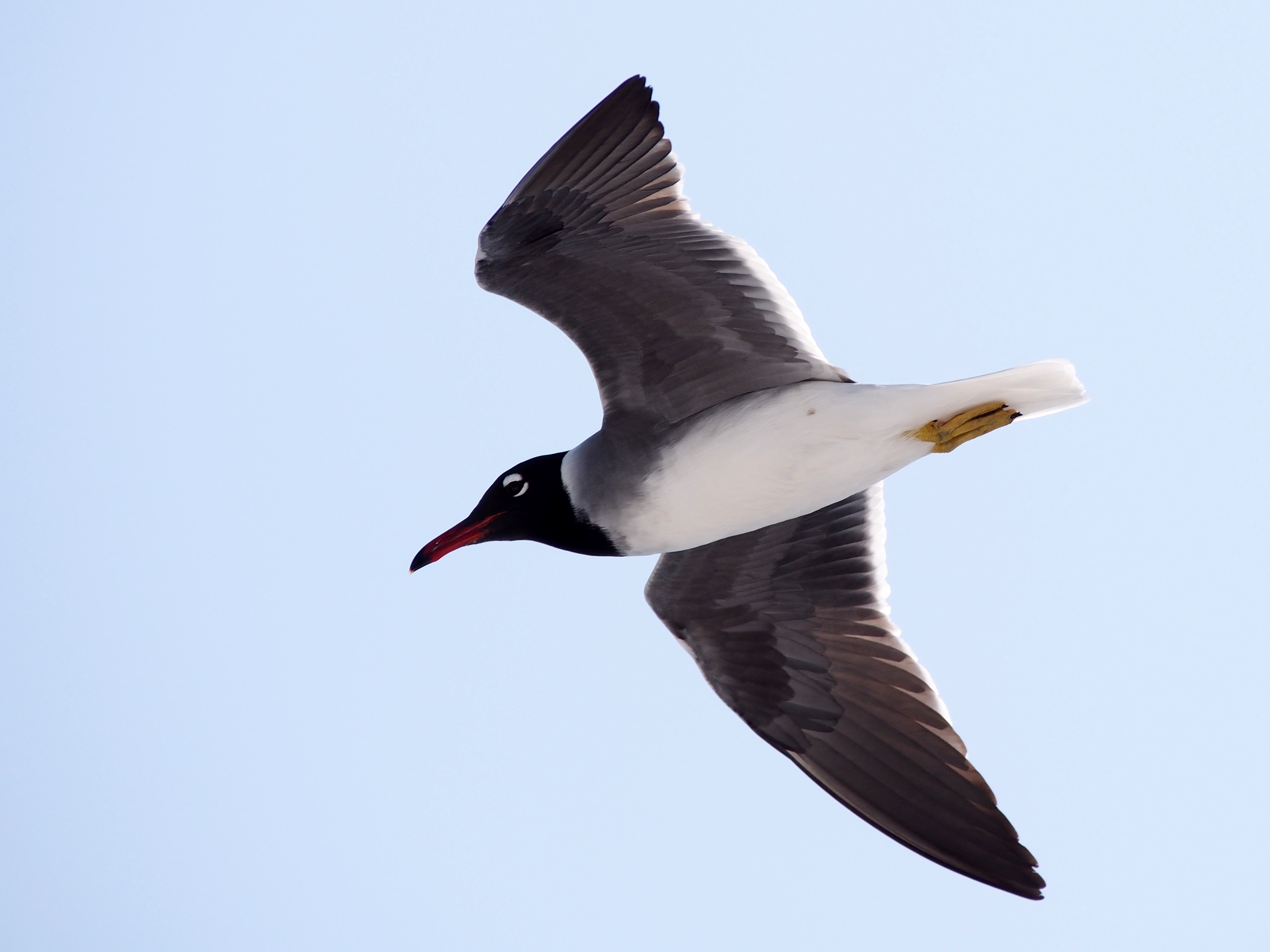

Conservation status
- Least Concern (IUCN 3.1)

Scientific classification
- Kingdom: Animalia
- Phylum: Chordata
- Class: Aves
- Order: Charadriiformes
- Family: Laridae
- Genus: Ichthyaetus
- Species: I. leucophthalmus

Binomial name
- Ichthyaetus leucophthalmus (Temminck, 1825)
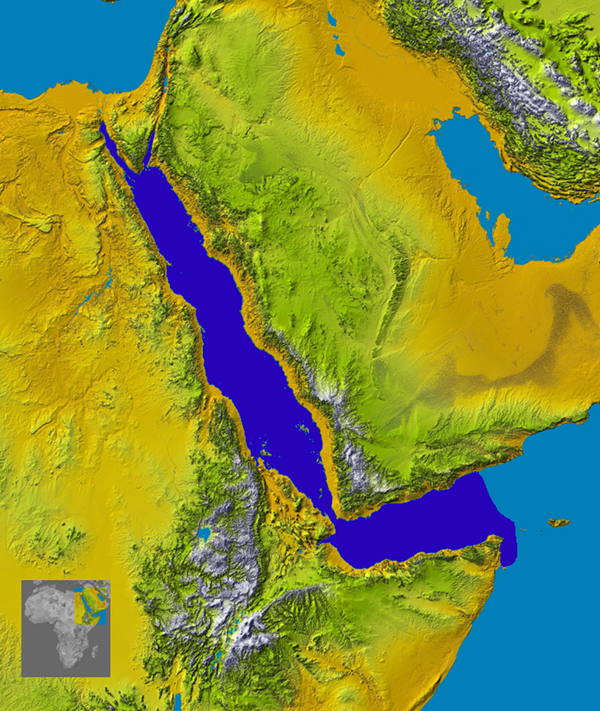
- Range of the White-eyed Gull (dark blue)

Synonyms
- Larus leucophthalmus

= White-eyed gull =

Species of bird

The white-eyed gull (Ichthyaetus leucophthalmus) is a small gull that is endemic to the Red Sea. Its closest relative is the sooty gull. The species is classed as Least Concern by the IUCN; human pressure and oil pollution are deemed the major threats. As is the case with many gulls, it has traditionally been placed in the genus Larus.

== Morphology ==
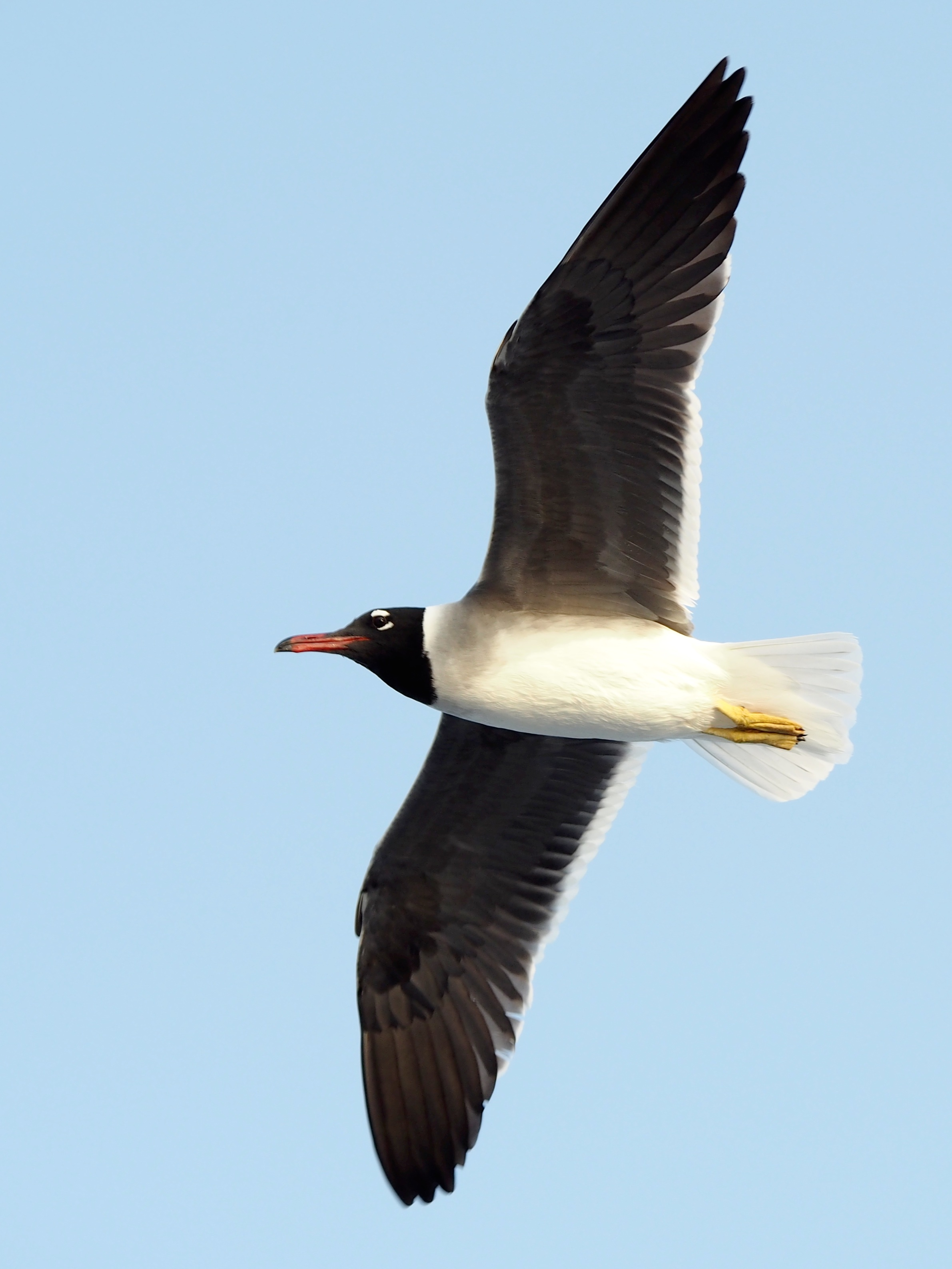
White-eyed gull at the Red Sea

Adult white-eyed gulls have a black hood in breeding plumage, which extends down onto the upper throat, and on the neck-sides is bordered below by a narrow white bar. The upperparts and inner upperwings are medium-dark grey; the breast is mid-grey but the rest of the underparts are white. The secondaries are black with a white trailing edge, and the primaries are black. The underwing is dark and the tail white. Adults in non-breeding plumage are similar, but the hood is flecked white small white spots.

The white-eyed gull acquires adult plumage at two to three years of age. Juvenile birds have a very different plumage—chocolate brown on the head, neck and breast, and with brown, broadly pale-fringed, feathers to the upperparts and upperwings, and a black tail. In their first winter, birds acquire greyer feathering on their head, breast and upperparts; the second-winter plumage is closer to that of the adult, but lacking the hood.

A distinctive feature of white-eyed gull at all ages is its long slender bill. This is black in younger birds, but in adults it is deep red with a black tip. The legs are yellow—dullest in younger birds, brightest in breeding plumaged adults. The eye itself is not white; the bird takes its name from white eye-crescents, which are present at all ages.

== Distribution ==
The white-eyed gull breeds on inshore islands with rocks and sandy beaches, such as the Siyal Islands, in the Red Sea from July to September. For the rest of the year it occurs throughout the Red Sea, with some birds travelling to Oman and Somalia.
