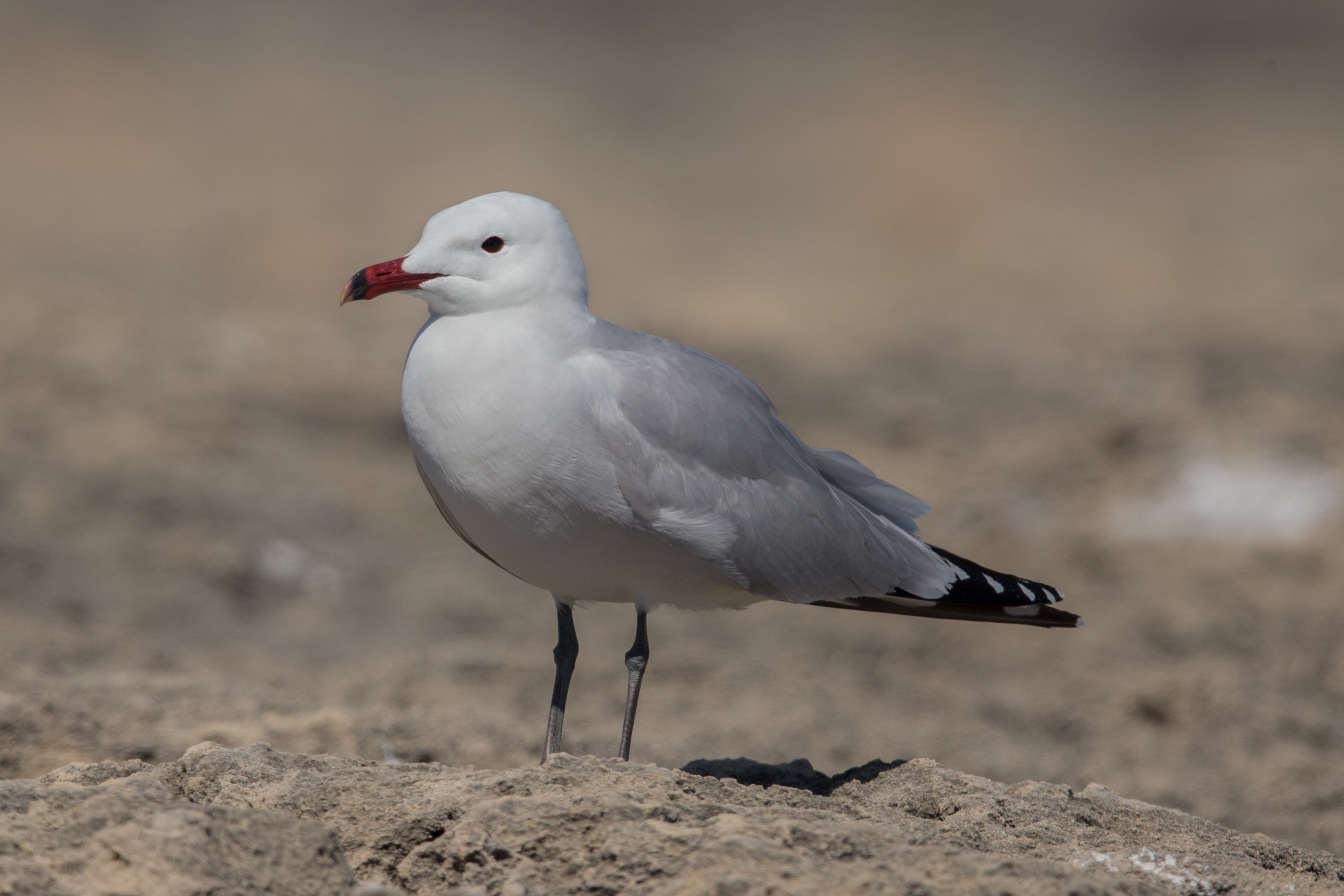

Conservation status
- Vulnerable (IUCN 3.1)

Scientific classification
- Kingdom: Animalia
- Phylum: Chordata
- Class: Aves
- Order: Charadriiformes
- Family: Laridae
- Genus: Ichthyaetus
- Species: I. audouinii

Binomial name
- Ichthyaetus audouinii (Payraudeau, 1826)

Synonyms
- Larus audouinii Payraudeau, 1826

= Audouin's gull =

Species of bird

Audouin's gull (Ichthyaetus audouinii) is a large gull restricted to the Mediterranean and the western coast of Saharan Africa and the Iberian Peninsula. The genus name is from Ancient Greek ikhthus, "fish", and aetos, "eagle", and the specific audouinii and the English name are after the French naturalist Jean Victoire Audouin.

It breeds on small islands colonially or alone, laying 2–3 eggs on a ground nest. As is the case with many gulls, it has traditionally been placed in the genus Larus.

In the late 1960s, this was one of the world's rarest gulls, with a population of only 1,000 pairs. It has established new colonies, but remains rare with a population of about 10,000 pairs.

This species, unlike many large gulls, rarely scavenges, but is a specialist fish eater, and is therefore strictly coastal and pelagic. This bird will feed at night, often well out to sea, but also slowly patrols close into beaches, occasionally dangling its legs to increase drag.

The adult resembles a small European herring gull, the most noticeable differences being the short stubby red bill and "string of pearls" white wing primary tips, rather than the large "mirrors" of some other species. The legs are grey-green. It takes four years to reach adult plumage.

This species shows little tendency to wander from its breeding areas, but there were single records in the Netherlands and England in May 2003, and one spent from December 2016 to April 2017 in Trinidad.

Audouin's gull is one of the species to which the Agreement on the Conservation of African-Eurasian Migratory Waterbirds (AEWA) applies.

== Gallery ==
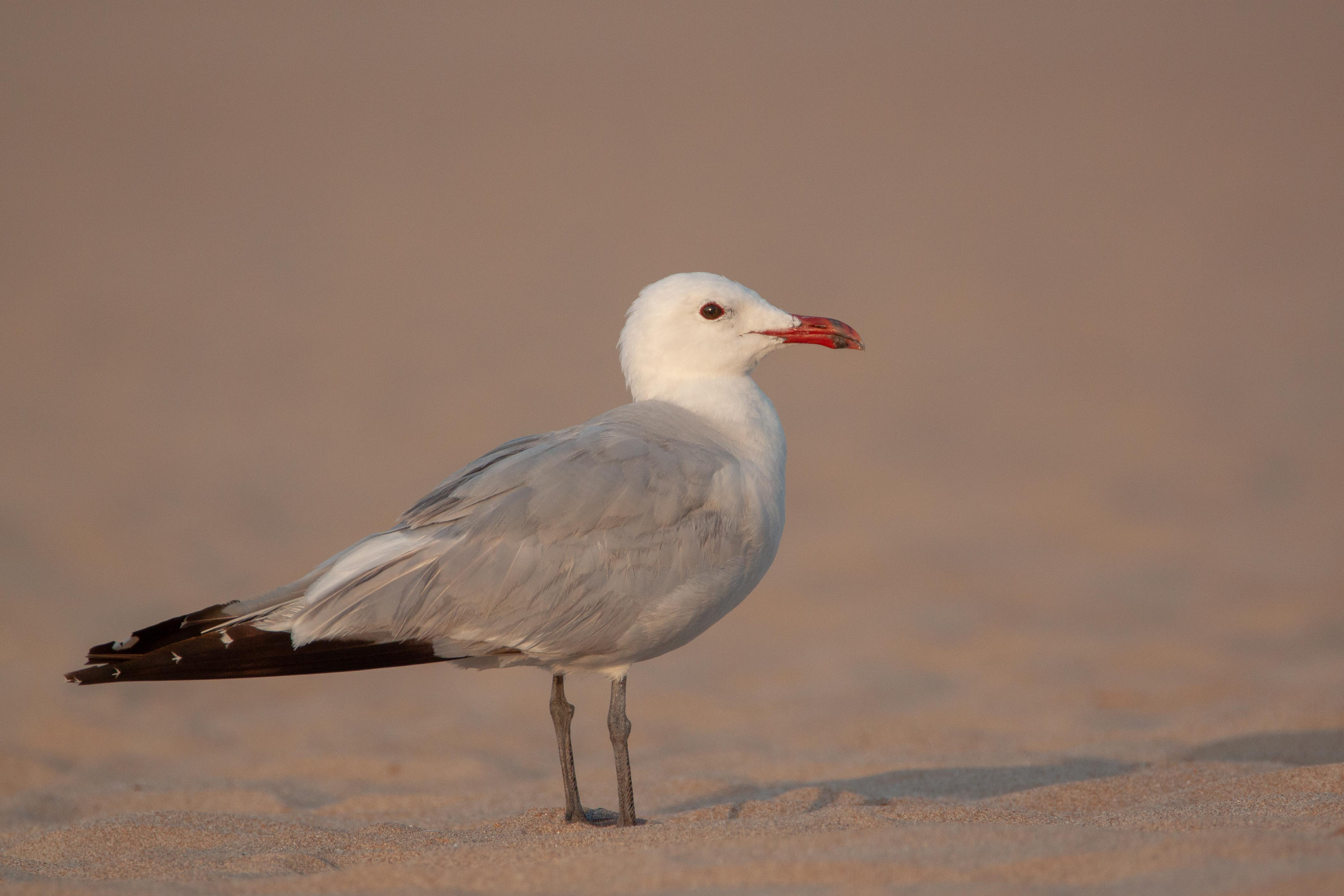
Audouin's gull

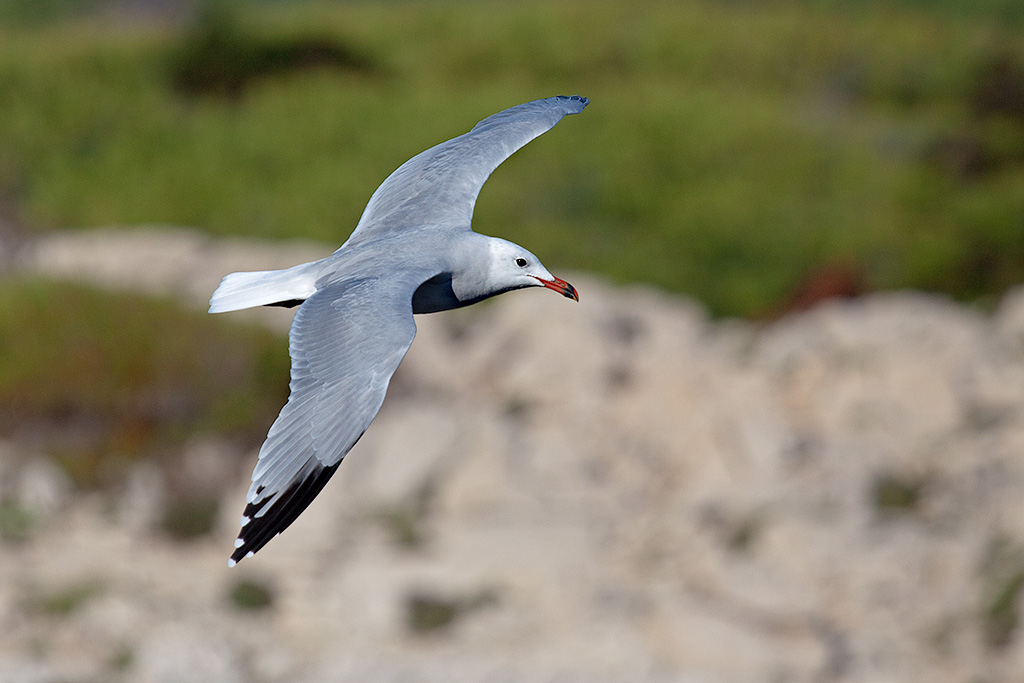
In flight

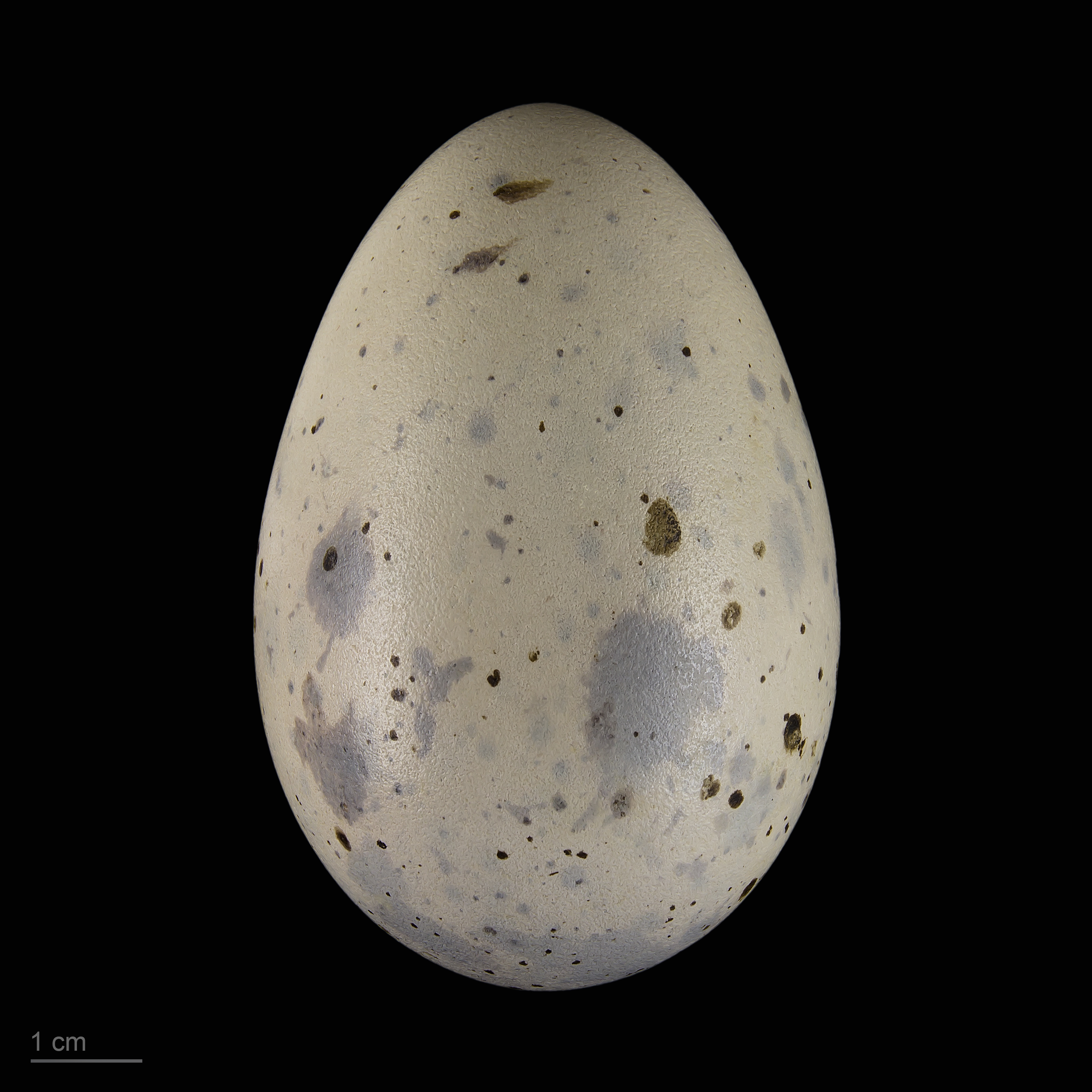
Egg of Ichthyaetus audouinii, MHNT
