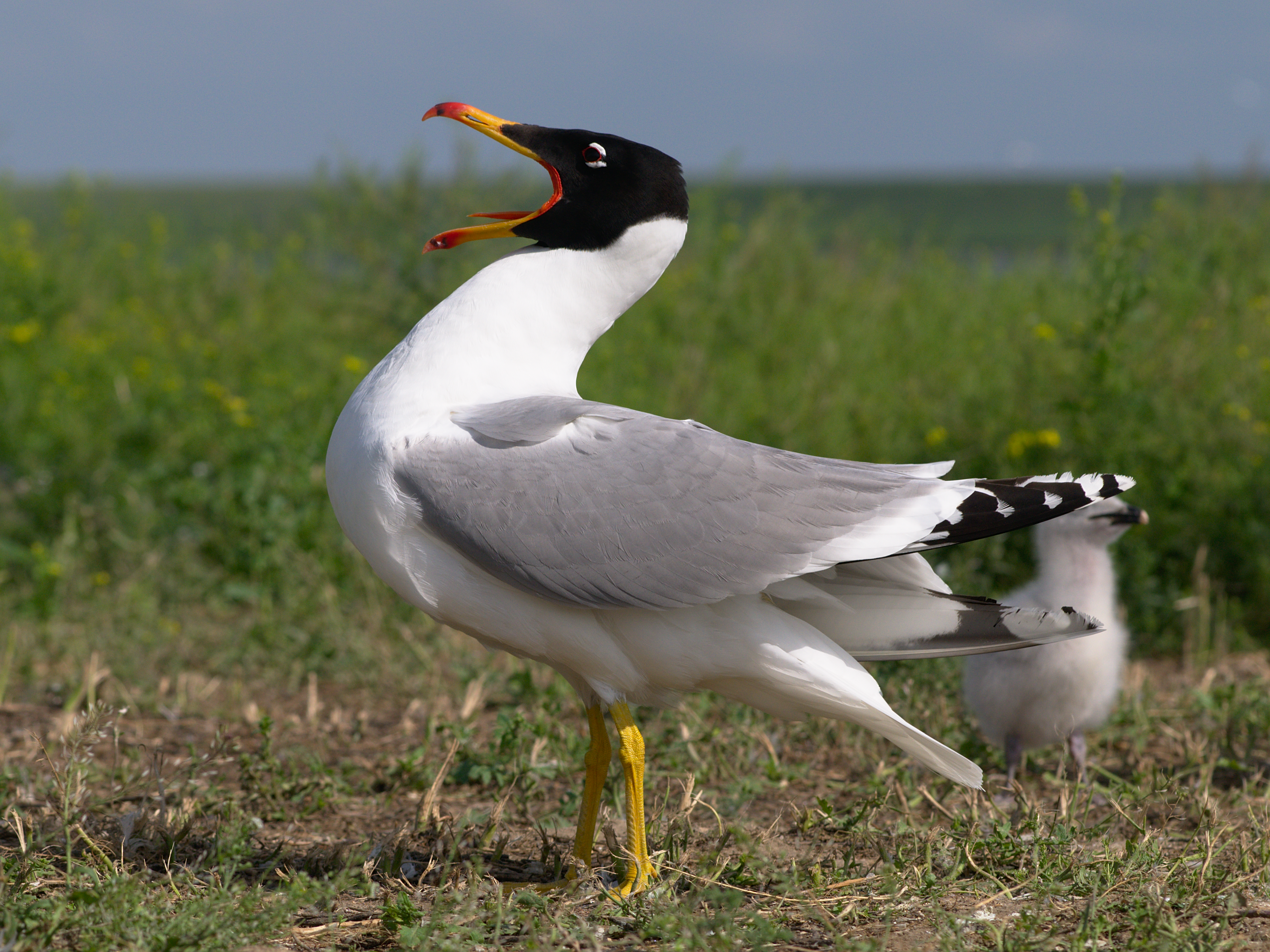

Conservation status
- Least Concern (IUCN 3.1)

Scientific classification
- Kingdom: Animalia
- Phylum: Chordata
- Class: Aves
- Order: Charadriiformes
- Family: Laridae
- Genus: Ichthyaetus
- Species: I. ichthyaetus

Binomial name
- Ichthyaetus ichthyaetus (Pallas, 1773)
- Range of I. ichthyaetus Breeding Non-breeding

Synonyms
- Larus ichthyaetus

= Pallas's gull =

Species of bird

Pallas's gull (Ichthyaetus ichthyaetus), also known as the great black-headed gull, is a large bird species. As is the case with many gulls, it has traditionally been placed in the genus Larus. The scientific name is from Ancient Greek. Ichthyaetus is from ikhthus, "fish", and aetos, "eagle".

== Distribution ==
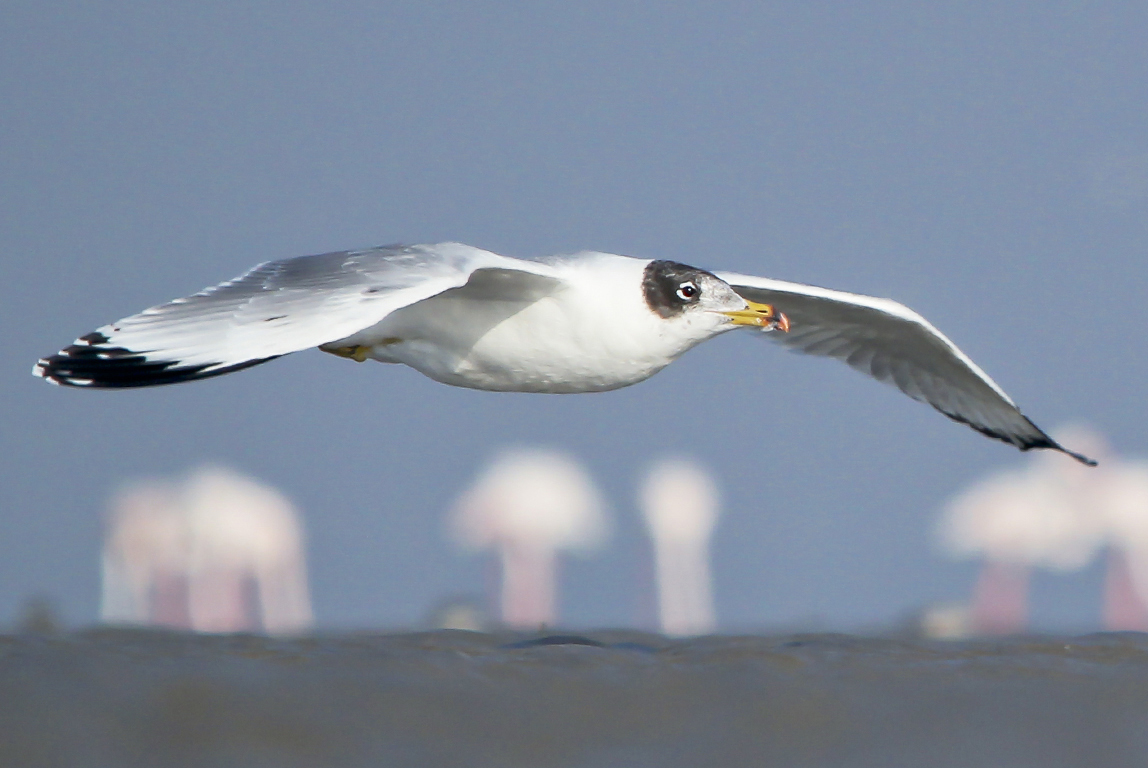
at Kutch

This species breeds in colonies in marshes and islands from southern Russia to Mongolia. It is migratory, wintering in the eastern Mediterranean, Arabia and India. This gull nests on the ground, laying between two and four eggs.

It occurs in western Europe only as a vagrant. In Great Britain a recent review left a single occurrence in 1859 as the only acceptable record of this bird. The species also occurs as a vagrant in differing parts of the Indian Ocean, south of its normal range, and along the northern and eastern coasts of Africa, where it visits annually on an irregular basis.

== Description ==
This is a very large gull, being easily the world's largest black-headed gull and the third largest species of gull in the world, after the great black-backed gull and the glaucous gull. It measures 55–72 cm (22–28 in) in length with a 142 to 170 cm (56 to 67 in) wingspan. Weight can vary from 0.96–2.1 kg (2.1–4.6 lb), with an average of 1.6 kg (3.5 lb) in males and 1.22 kg (2.7 lb) in females. Among standard measurements, the wing chord is 43.5 to 52 cm (17.1 to 20.5 in), the bill is 4.7 to 7.3 cm (1.9 to 2.9 in) and the tarsus is 6.5 to 8.4 cm (2.6 to 3.3 in). Summer adults are unmistakable, since no other gull of this size has a black hood. The adults have grey wings and back, with conspicuous white "mirrors" at the wing tips. The legs are yellow and the bill is orangey-yellow with a red tip.

In all other plumages, a dark mask through the eye indicates the vestiges of the hood. The call is a deep aargh cry. Young birds attain largely grey upperparts quite rapidly, but they take four years to reach maturity.

== Ecology ==
This bird has a deep, rather nasal flight-call which resembles the call of the lesser black-backed gull. Although they are noisy at colonies, Pallas's gulls are mostly silent when breeding.

These birds are predatory, taking fish, crustaceans, insects and even small mammals.

The Pallas's gull is one of the species to which the Agreement on the Conservation of African-Eurasian Migratory Waterbirds (AEWA) applies.

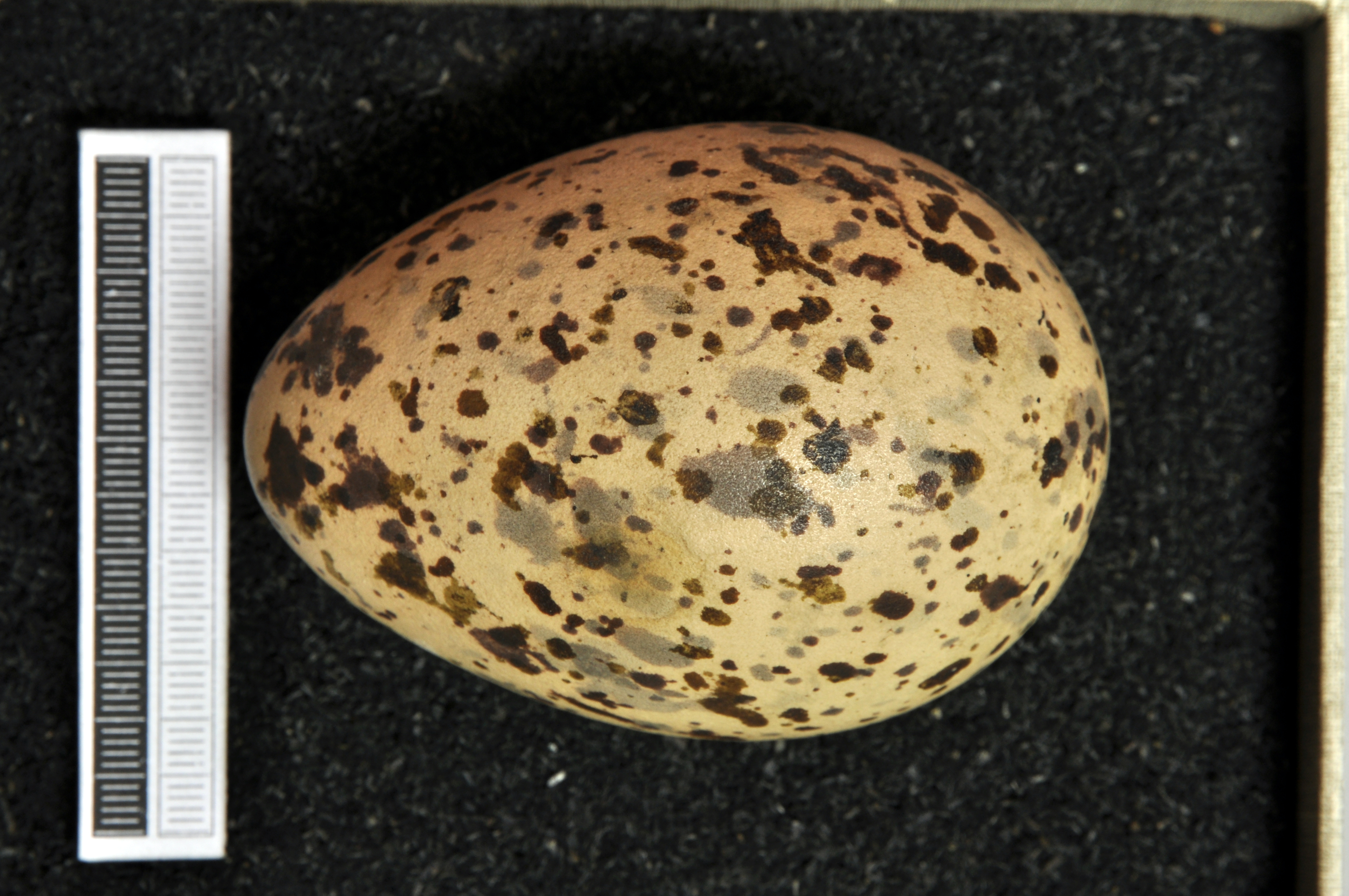
Egg, collection Museum Wiesbaden, Germany

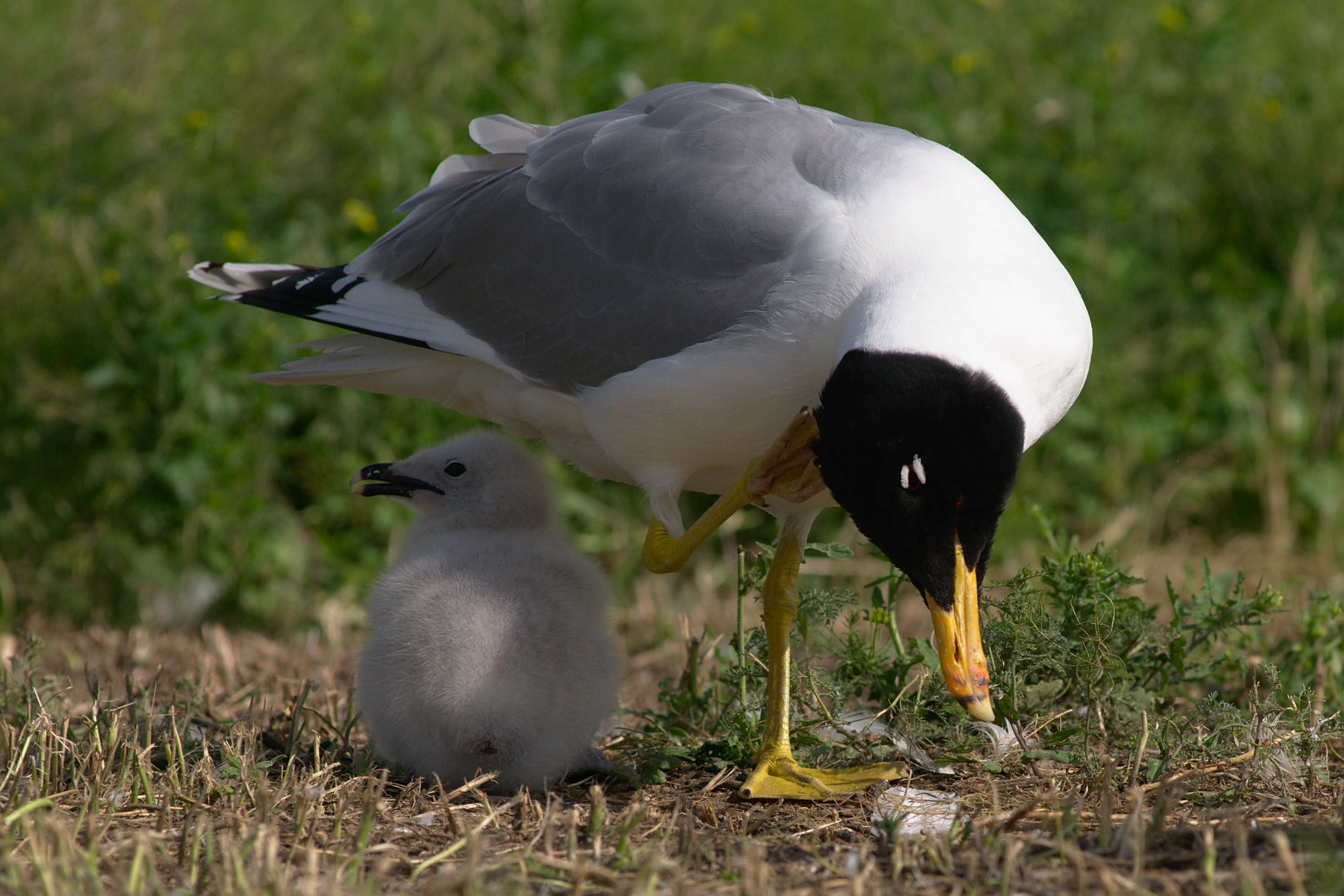
Adult with chick, Kalmykia, Russia.

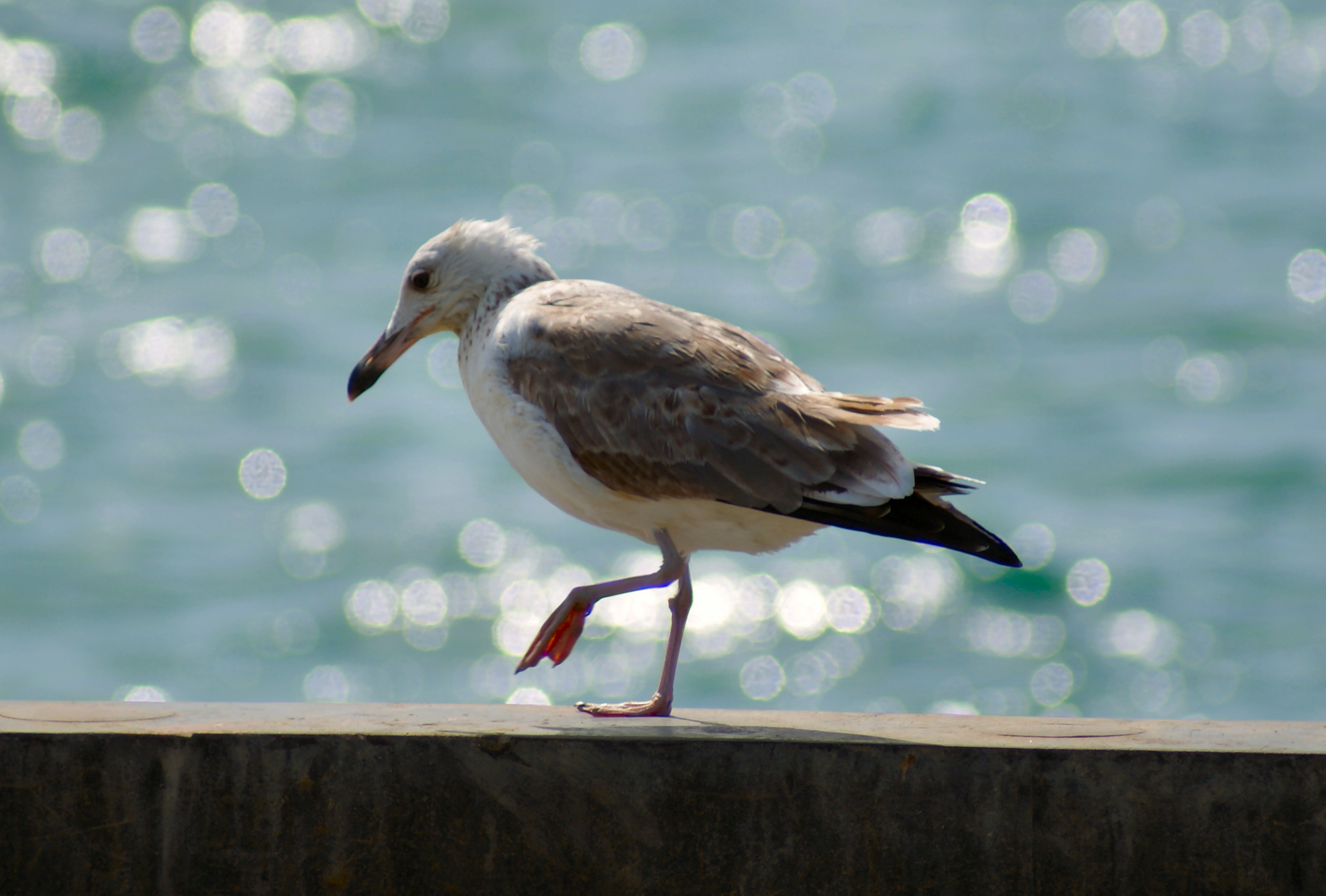
juvenile

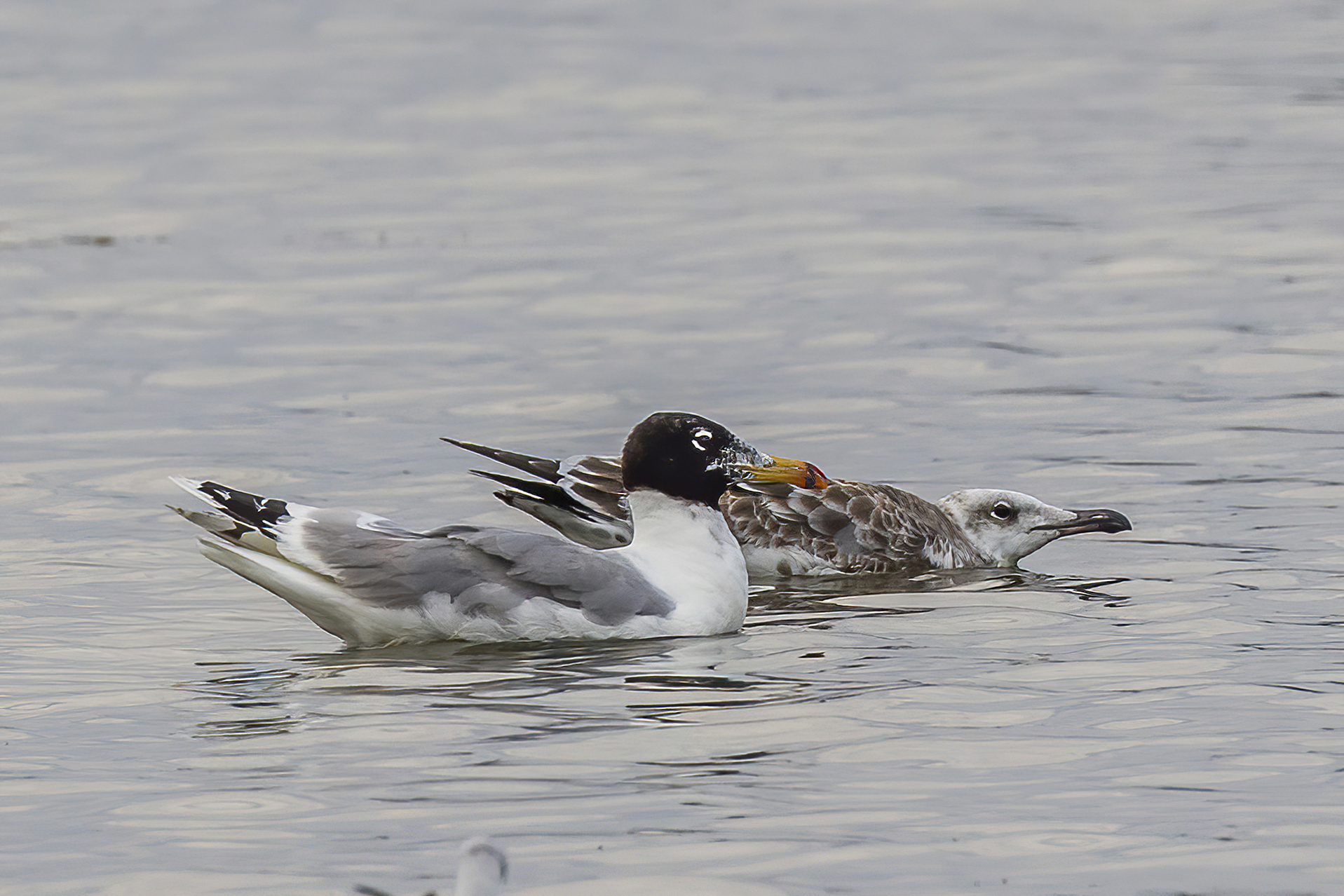
adult with juvenile, Romania

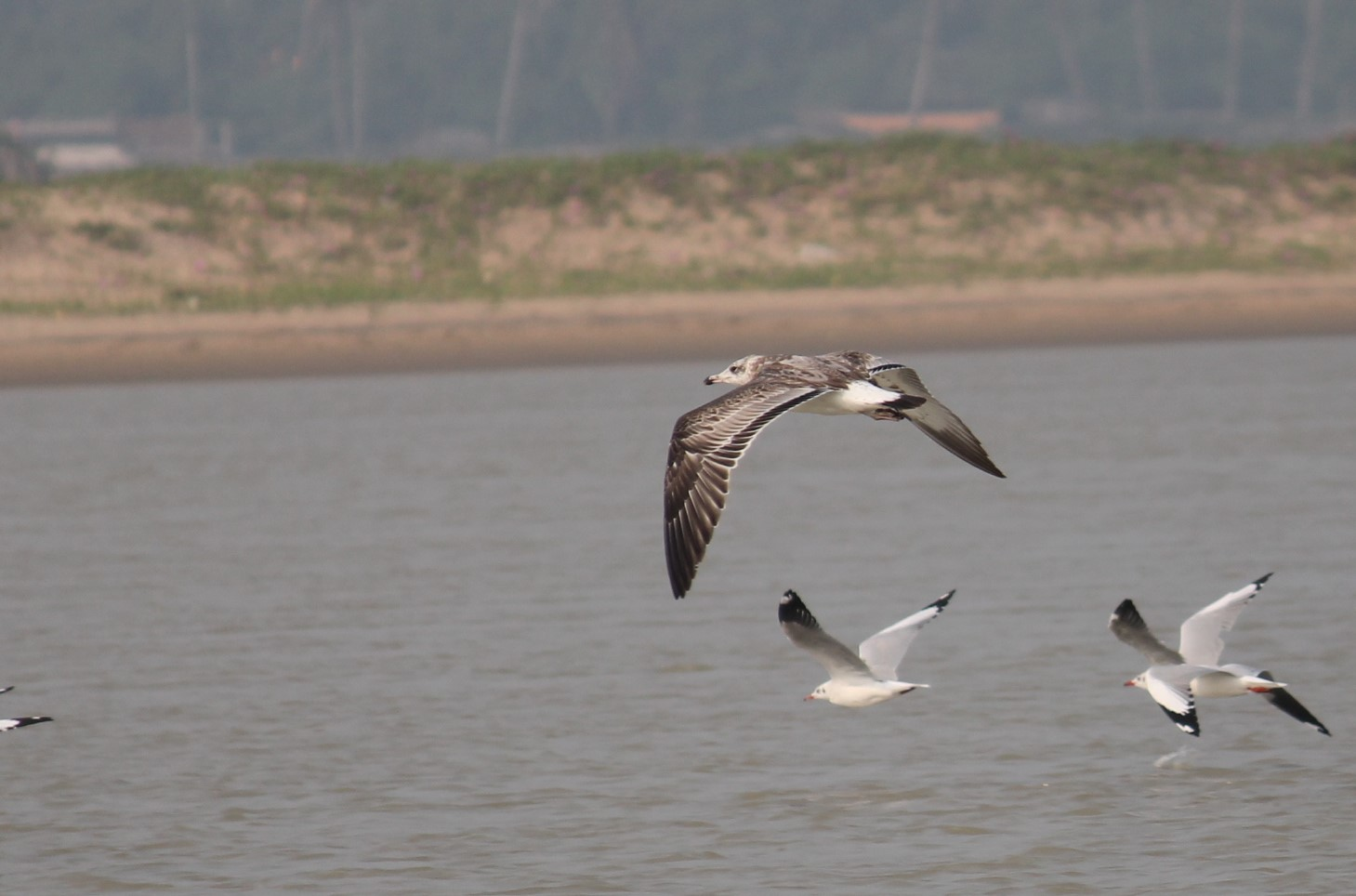
First-winter in India
