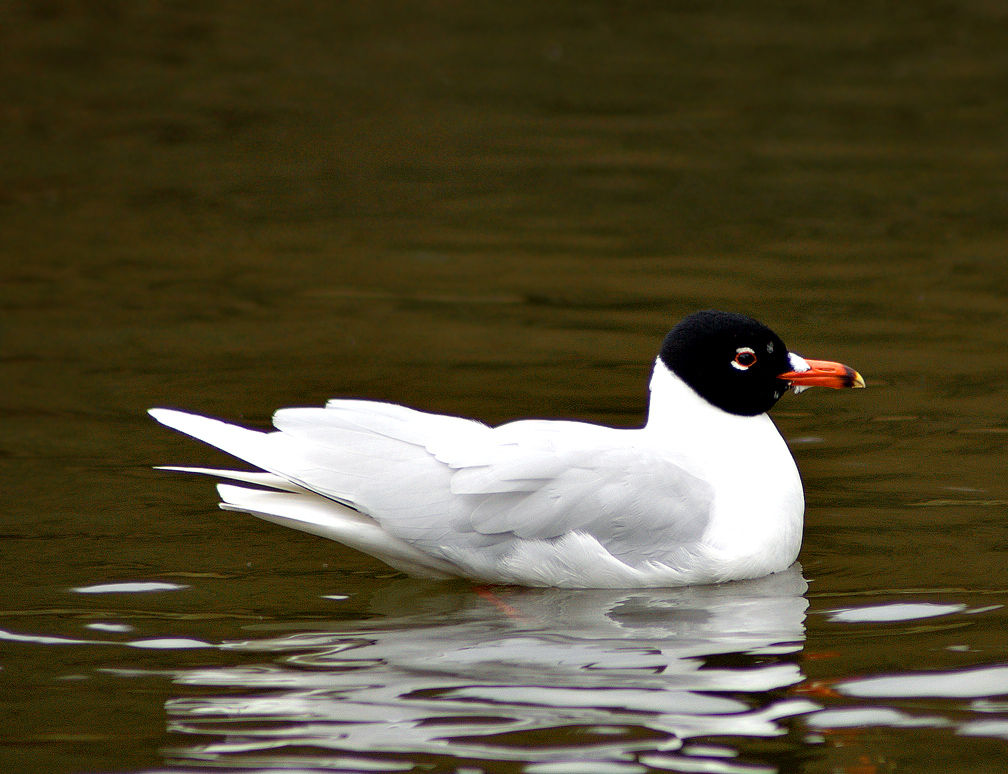
- Breeding plumage

Conservation status
- Least Concern (IUCN 3.1)

Scientific classification
- Kingdom: Animalia
- Phylum: Chordata
- Class: Aves
- Order: Charadriiformes
- Family: Laridae
- Genus: Ichthyaetus
- Species: I. melanocephalus

Binomial name
- Ichthyaetus melanocephalus (Temminck, 1820)
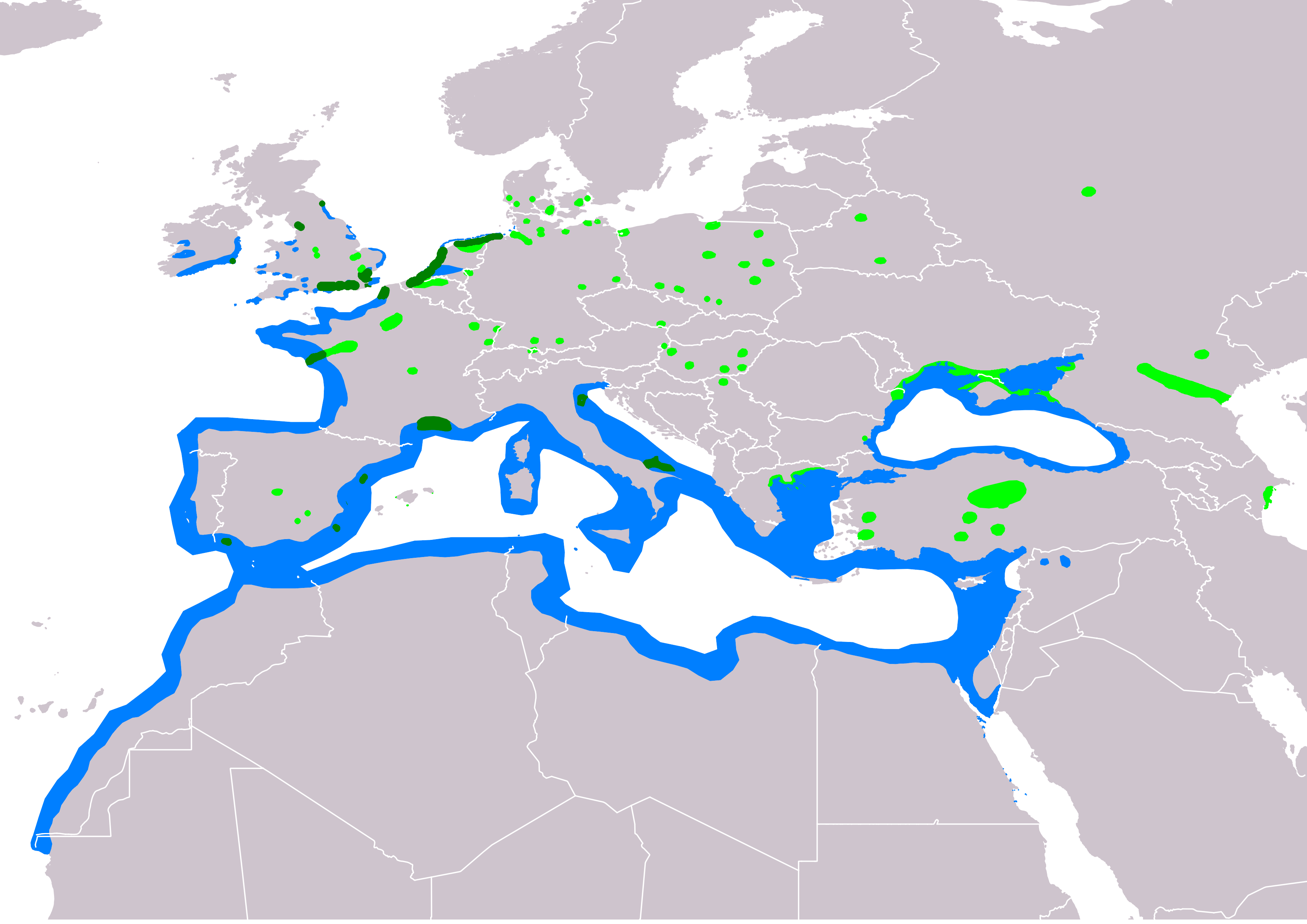
- Range of I. melanocephalus Breeding Resident Non-breeding

Synonyms
- Larus melanocephalus

= Mediterranean gull =

Species of bird

Adult and second-summer Mediterranean gulls, Den Hoorn, North Holland (2011)

The Mediterranean gull (Ichthyaetus melanocephalus) is a small gull. The scientific name is from Ancient Greek. The genus Ichthyaetus is from ikhthus, "fish", and aetos, "eagle", and the specific melanocephalus is from melas, "black", and -kephalos "-headed".

This gull breeds almost entirely in the Western Palearctic, mainly in the south east, especially around the Black Sea, and in central Turkey. There are colonies elsewhere in southern Europe, and this species has undergone a dramatic range expansion in recent decades. As is the case with many gulls, it has traditionally been placed in the genus Larus.

== Description ==
The Mediterranean gull is slightly larger and bulkier than the black-headed gull with a heavier bill and longer, darker legs. The breeding plumage adult is a distinctive white gull, with a very pale grey mantle and wings with white primary feathers without black tips. The black hood extends down the nape and shows distinct white eye crescents. The sharp-tipped, parallel sided, dark red bill has a black subterminal band. The non breeding adult is similar but the hood is reduced to an extensive dusky "bandit" mask through the eye. This bird takes two years to reach maturity. First year birds have a black terminal tail band and more black areas in the upperwings, but have pale underwings.

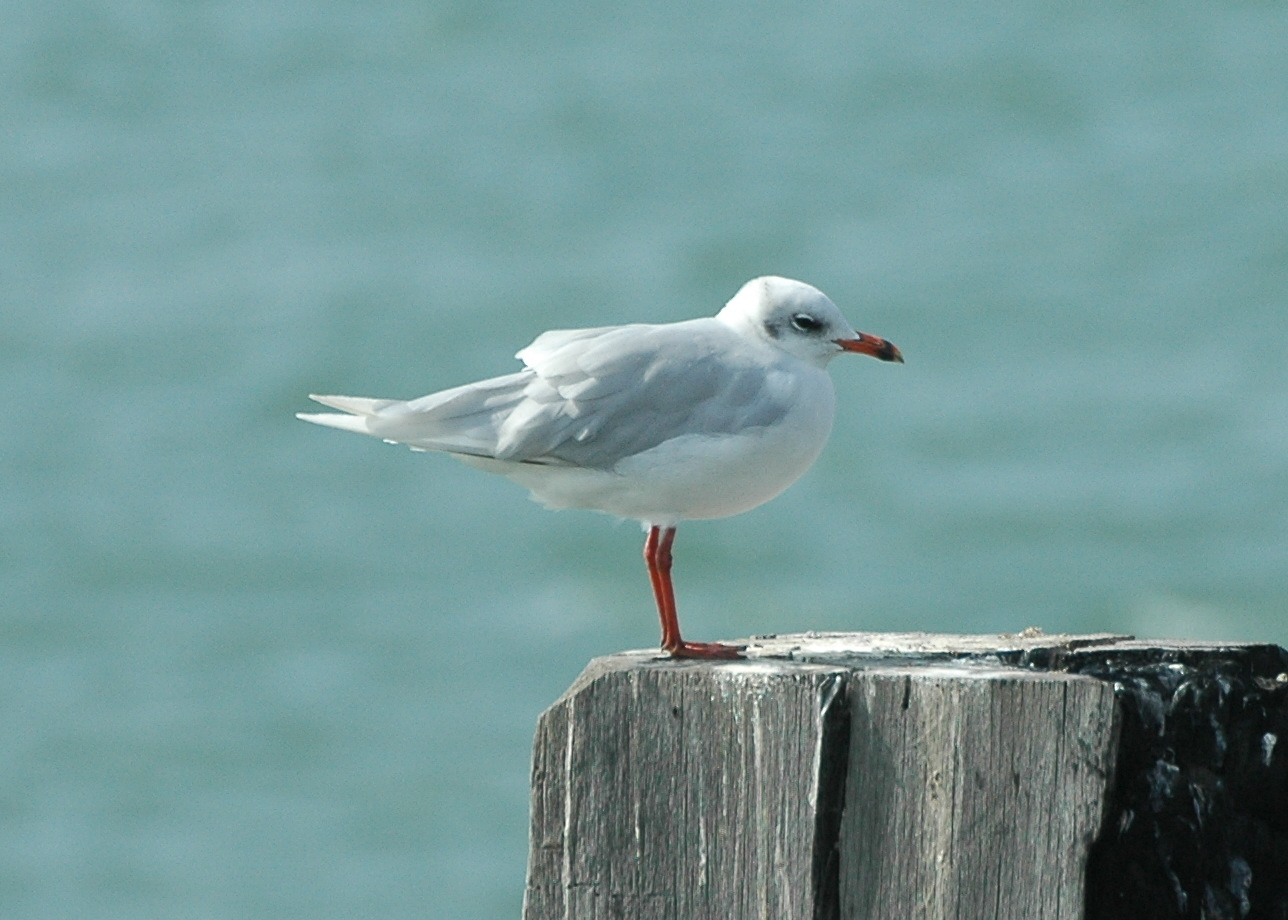
non-breeding plumage, UK

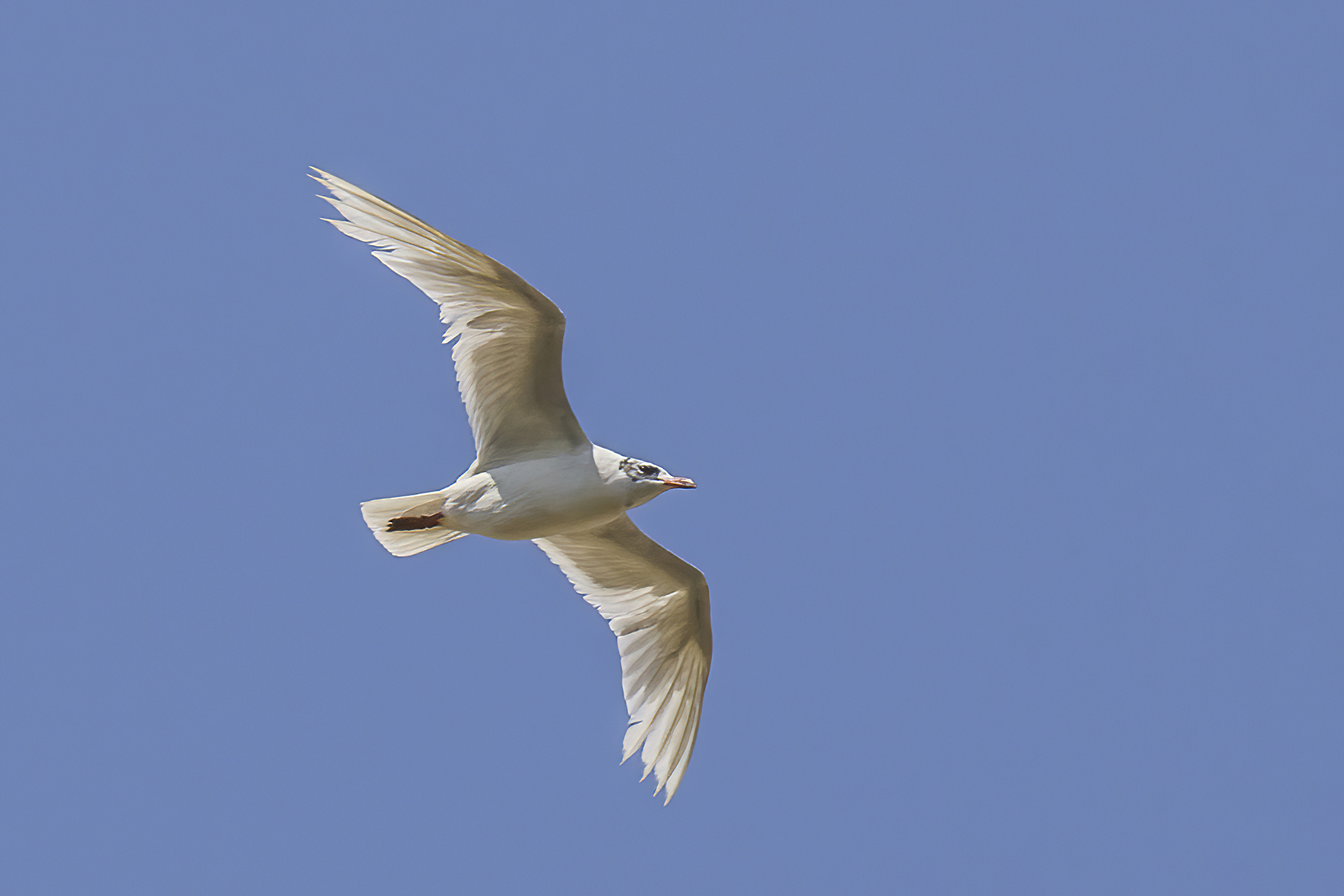
non-breeding plumage, Romania

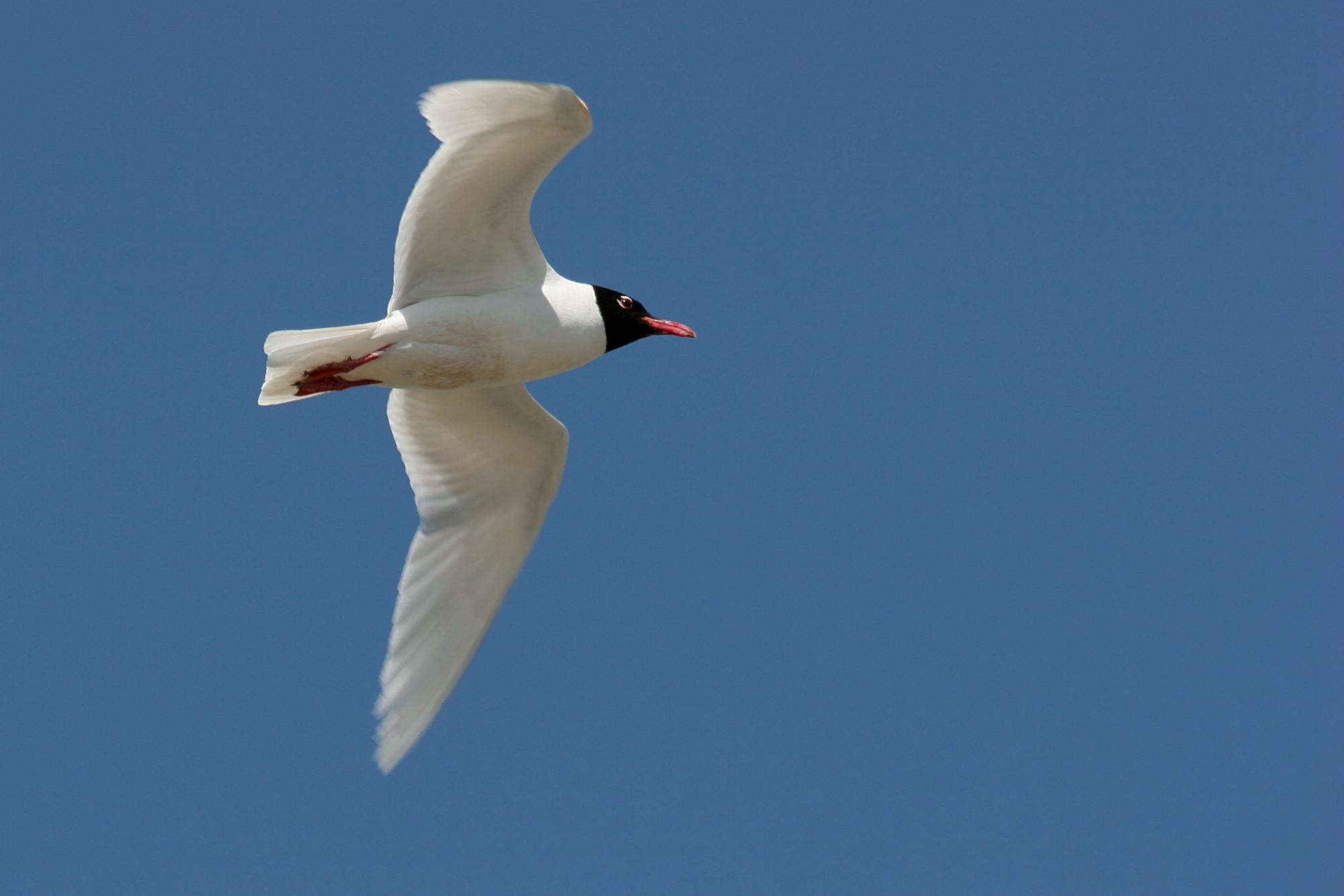
breeding plumage, Ukraine

== Distribution ==
Formerly restricted to the Black Sea and the eastern Mediterranean this species has now expanded over most of Europe as far as Great Britain and Ireland, with 37 sites: 543–592 pairs in the United Kingdom in 2008, breeding in Scotland for the first time in 2023. In Ireland breeding has been recorded in at least four counties. Breeding has also occurred in Belgium, the Netherlands, Denmark, Sweden, Estonia, Switzerland, the Czech Republic, Hungary and the Balkans.

In winter, this bird migrates to Mediterranean and Atlantic coasts.

== Ecology ==
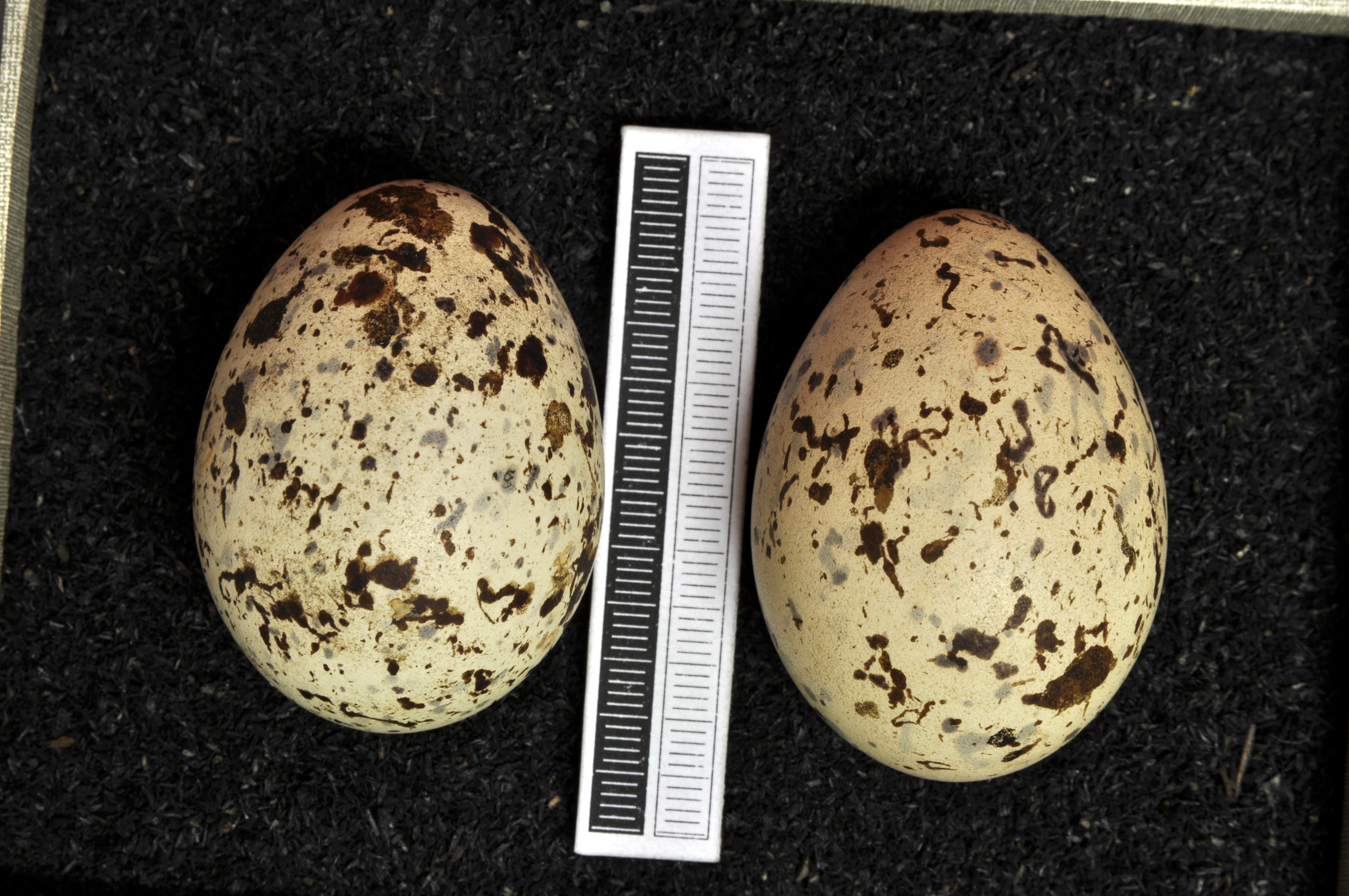
Eggs, Collection Museum Wiesbaden

This gull breeds in colonies in large reed beds or marshes, or on islands in lakes; where its population is small, it nests in black-headed gull colonies. Like most gulls, it is highly gregarious in winter, both when feeding or in evening roosts. It is not a pelagic species, and is rarely seen at sea far from coasts.

The Mediterranean gull's feeding habits are much an opportunistic omnivore, eating fish, worms, insects, eggs, young birds, offal and carrion.

This is a noisy species, especially at colonies, with a nasal "yeah" call.

== Conservation ==
The Mediterranean gull is one of the species to which the Agreement on the Conservation of African-Eurasian Migratory Waterbirds (AEWA) applies.
