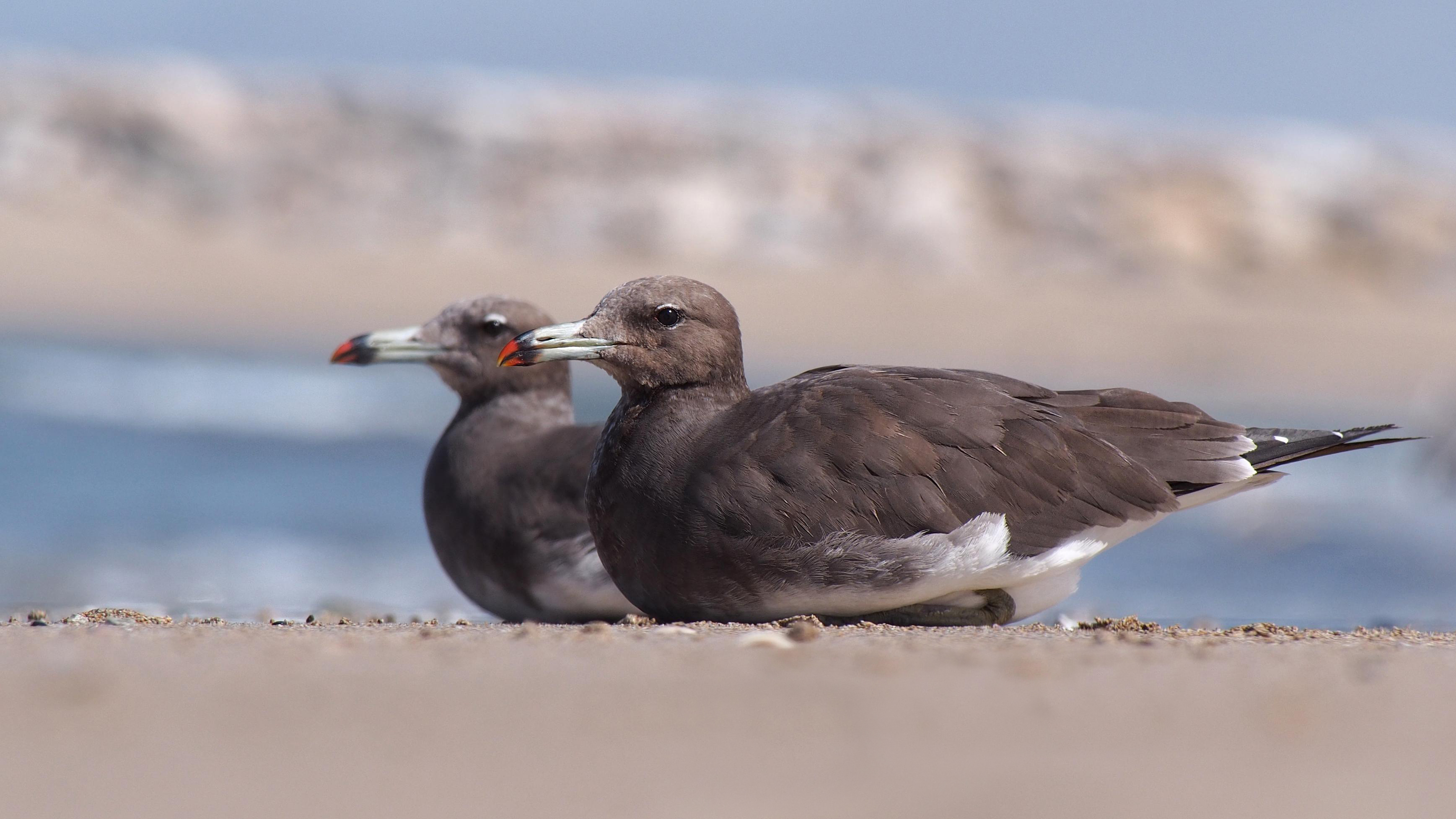
- Sooty gulls in Oman

Conservation status
- Least Concern (IUCN 3.1)

Scientific classification
- Kingdom: Animalia
- Phylum: Chordata
- Class: Aves
- Order: Charadriiformes
- Family: Laridae
- Genus: Ichthyaetus
- Species: I. hemprichii

Binomial name
- Ichthyaetus hemprichii (Bruch, 1855)

Synonyms
- Larus hemprichi; Larus hemprichii

= Sooty gull =

Species of bird

The sooty gull (Ichthyaetus hemprichii) is a species of gull in the family Laridae, also known as the Aden gull or Hemprich's gull. It is found in Bahrain, Djibouti, Egypt, Eritrea, India, Iran, Israel, Jordan, Kenya, Lebanon, Maldives, Mozambique, Oman, Pakistan, Palestine, Qatar, Saudi Arabia, Somalia, Sri Lanka, Sudan, Tanzania, United Arab Emirates, and Yemen. As is the case with many gulls, it has traditionally been placed in the genus Larus. The sooty gull is named in honour of the German naturalist Wilhelm Hemprich who died in 1825 while on a scientific expedition to Egypt and the Middle East with his friend Christian Gottfried Ehrenberg.

== Distribution and habitat ==
The sooty gull is native to the Red Sea, the Gulf of Aden, the Gulf of Oman, the Persian Gulf and its range extends as far east as Pakistan. It is also native to the east coast of Africa as far south as Tanzania and Mozambique. It occurs as a vagrant in India, Sri Lanka, the Maldives, Jordan, Lebanon, Palestine and Bahrain. It is a coastal bird, seldom going further out to sea than about 10 km (6 mi) beyond coastal reefs although it has occasionally been seen 140 km (87 mi) from land. It frequents ports and harbours, the coast, inshore islands and the intertidal zone. It seldom moves inland or visits freshwater locations. It is nomadic or partially migratory and many populations move southwards after breeding, though Red Sea populations seem to be relatively sedentary.

== Behaviour ==
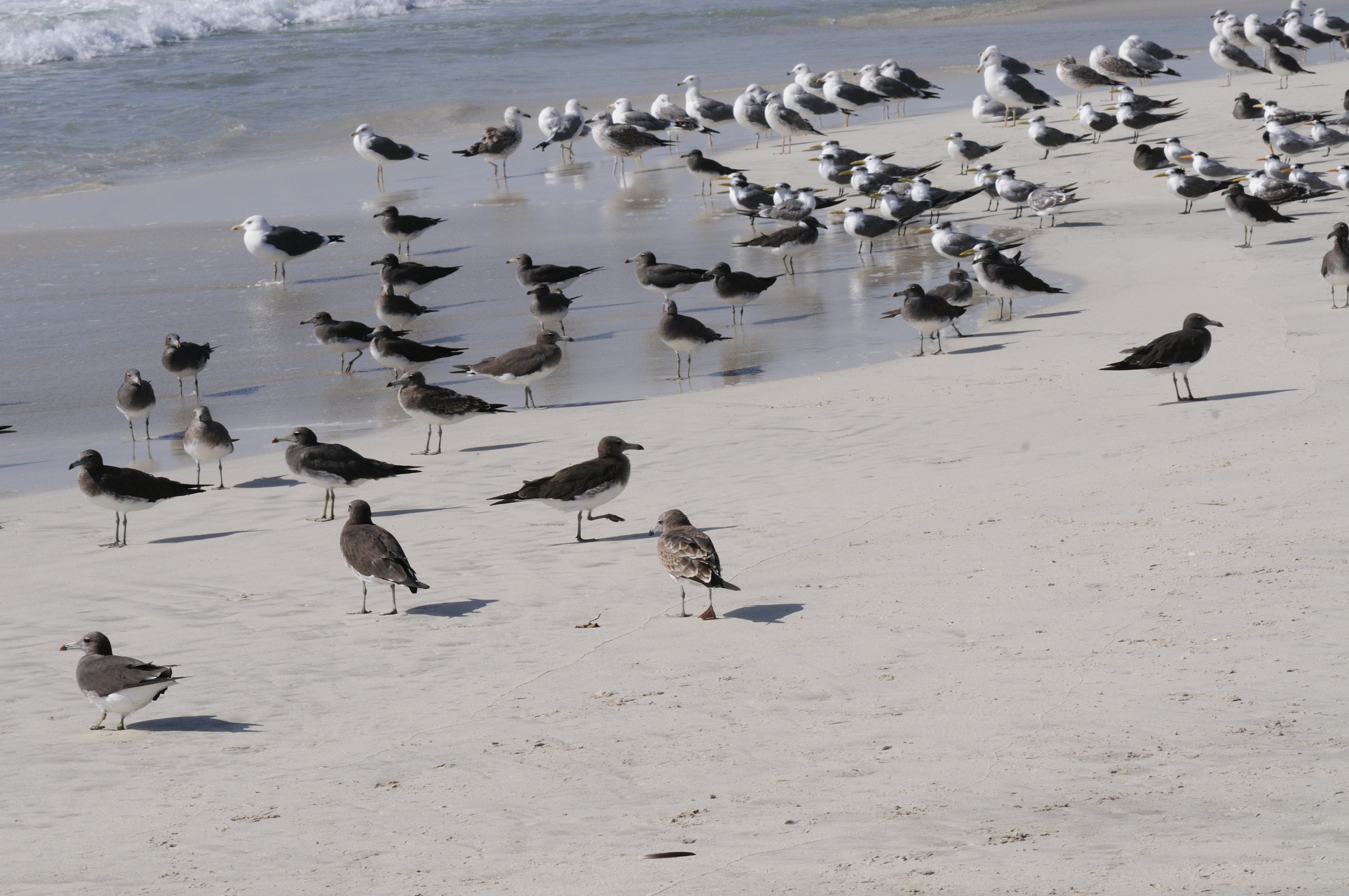
On the beach, Oman

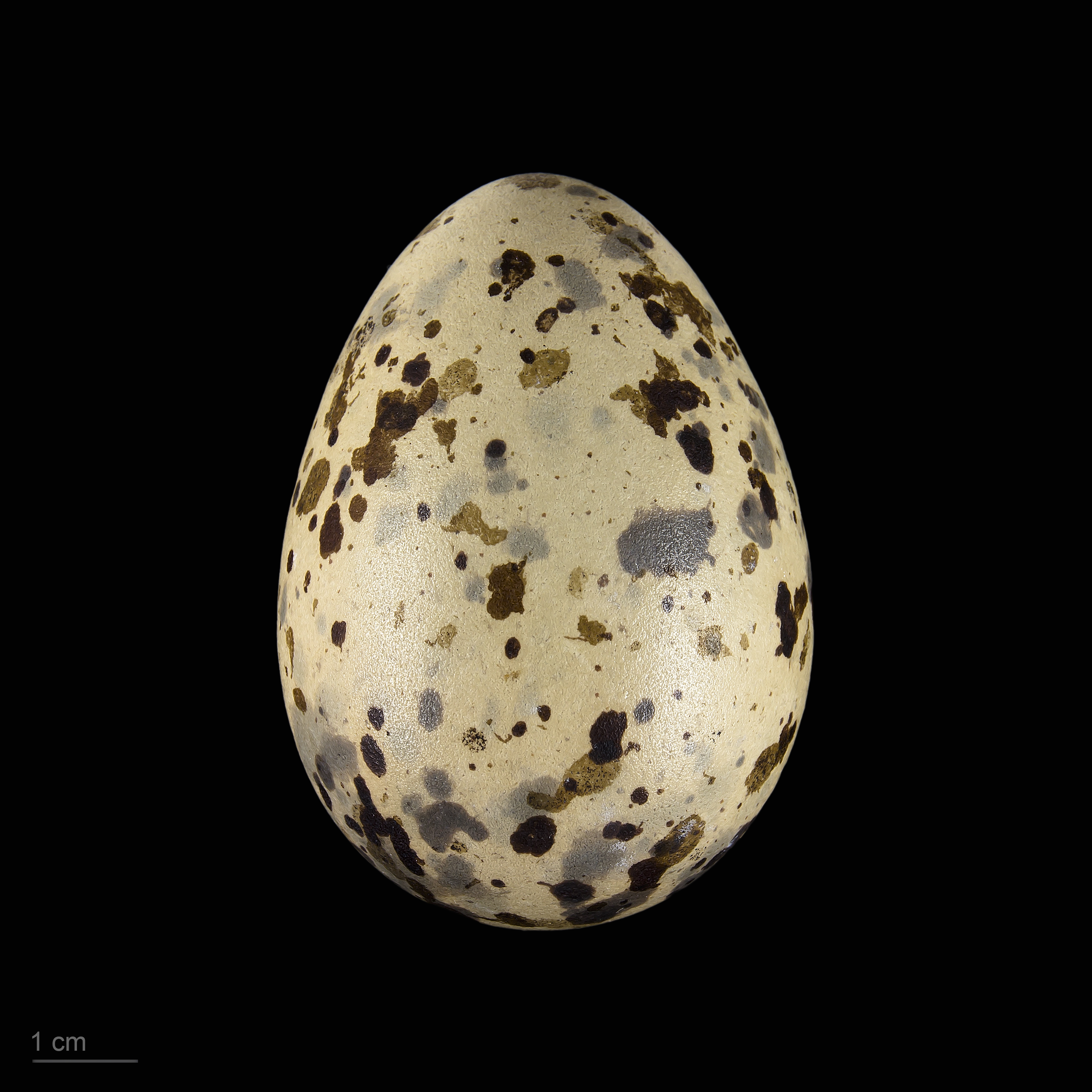
oeufs de Ichthyaetus hemprichii - MHNT

The sooty gull is a predator and scavenger. It feeds on discarded fish and fish offal, other small fish that it catches itself, prawns, newly hatched turtles and the eggs and chicks of other sea birds.

Breeding takes place during the summer. It usually nests in small colonies on inshore coral islands, particularly outer islands protected by reefs with rock, sand and sparse vegetation. Nests are sometimes solitary, particularly in Africa, or may be scattered among the nests of other colonial sea birds. The nest may consist of a bare scrape in the coral in an exposed position or may be protected by a coral overhang or sheltered beneath a low-growing mangrove or a seepweed bush.

== Status ==
The IUCN lists the sooty gull as being of "Least Concern". This is because it has a very wide range and its total population is large. The population trend is believed to be downwards but the rate of decrease is insufficient to warrant listing the bird in a more threatened category. The main threats faced by the bird are from the exploration of some of its traditional breeding grounds for oil, land reclamation, and the possibility of oil spills.
