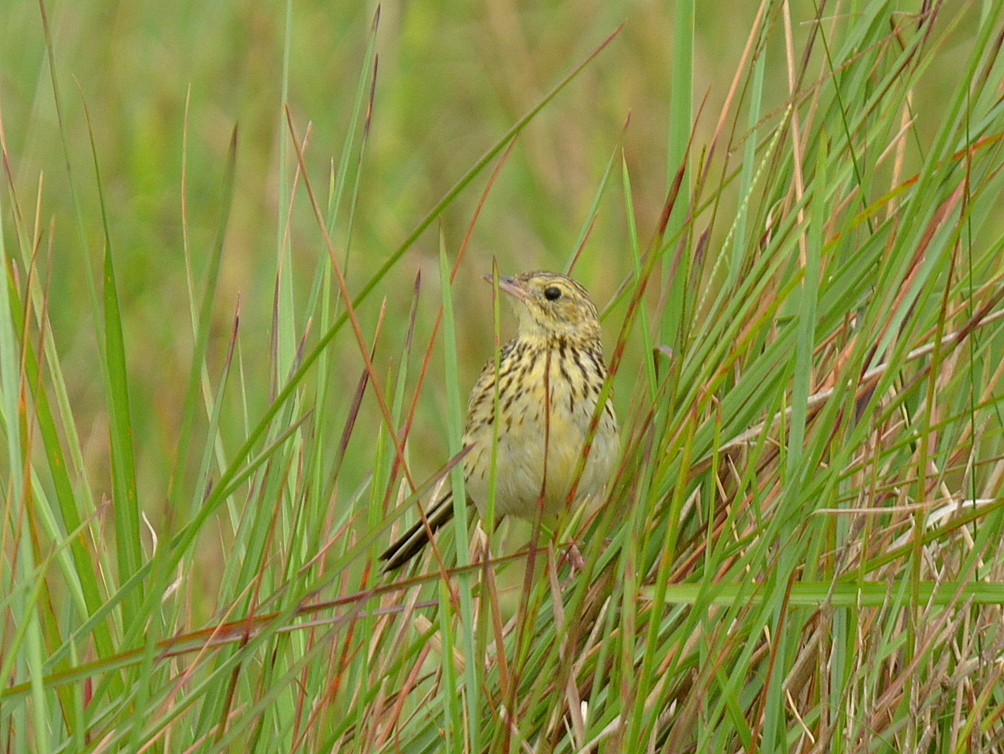

Conservation status
- Vulnerable (IUCN 3.1)

Scientific classification
- Kingdom: Animalia
- Phylum: Chordata
- Class: Aves
- Order: Passeriformes
- Family: Motacillidae
- Genus: Anthus
- Species: A. nattereri

Binomial name
- Anthus nattereri Sclater, PL, 1878

= Ochre-breasted pipit =

Species of bird

The ochre-breasted pipit (Anthus nattereri) is a Vulnerable species of bird in the family Motacillidae, the wagtails and pipits. It is found in Argentina, Brazil, Paraguay, and Uruguay.

== Taxonomy and systematics ==
The ochre-breasted pipit was originally described by Philip Sclater in 1878 with its current binomial Anthus nattereri. What is now the type specimen had originally been identified as a correndera pipit (A. correndera) but Sclater noted enough differences to reclassify the bird. His specific epithet honors Johann Natterer, who had collected the type specimen.

The ochre-breasted pipit is monotypic.

== Description ==
The ochre-breasted pipit is 13.5 to 15 cm (5.3 to 5.9 in) long. The sexes have the same plumage. Adults have a blackish brown head with a yellow-buff supercilium, a thin dark "moustache", and a black spot on the cheek. Their upperparts and wings are mostly blackish brown with bright buff or golden ochraceous-yellow feather edges that give a bold streaked appearance. Their rump is more rufous and less streaked than their back. Their tail's inner three pairs of feathers are dark brown. The next pair outward are medium brown with white tips, the next brownish white with a large dark brown wedge on the inner web, and the outermost pair like the previous with a smaller brown mark. Their throat is creamy, their breast golden-buff to orange with brown streaks, their flanks rufous-buff with brown streaks, and their belly unstreaked buffy white. They have a dark iris, a brown maxilla, a mostly pale mandible, and yellow-brown to reddish brown legs and feet.

== Distribution and habitat ==
The ochre-breasted pipit has a highly fragmented distribution. It is found in Brazil intermittently from central Minas Gerais south to central Rio Grande do Sul, in southern Paraguay, in northern and central Uruguay, and in northeastern Argentina's Corrientes Province. It inhabits a variety of landscapes, most of which are treeless. These include campo grassland, pastures, fields, and other open areas. In some areas it appears to favor regenerating burned or lightly grazed areas. It has been recorded in young Eucalyptus plantations during the breeding season. In elevation it mostly is found below 900 m (3,000 ft) but occurs locally higher in Brazil.

== Behavior ==
=== Movement ===
The ochre-breasted pipit is non-migratory but is believed to be somewhat nomadic in response to weather or climate conditions.

=== Feeding ===
The ochre-breasted pipit's diet has not been studied but is known to include small invertebrates. It forages on the ground.

=== Breeding ===
The ochre-breasted pipit apparently breeds between September and January. Males make an aerial display in which the hover about 25 m (80 ft) above the ground and then spiral down. The species' nest is a cup made from plant material placed on the ground by a grass tussock. The only known clutch was of four eggs; apparently only the female incubated. The shiny cowbird (Molothrus bonariensis) is a brood parasite.

=== Vocalization ===
The ochre-breasted pipit sings during the aerial display, a "very high, sharp, twittering series in 3-6 slightly lowered groups of notes without intervals, ending in a gliding-down èèèh-èèèh-èèèh".

== Status ==
The IUCN originally in 1988 assessed the ochre-breasted pipit as Threatened, then in 1994 as Endangered, and since 2000 as Vulnerable. Though its overall range is about 1,120,000 km^{2} (430,000 sq mi) its actual area of occupancy is much fragmented, much smaller, and not quantified. Its population size is not known and is believed to be decreasing. "The species is threatened by habitat loss, mainly through conversion of dry grasslands to cash-crop fields (mostly sugarcane, soybeans and rice), Eucalyptus plantations, cattle pastures, mining and urban expansion. Intensive grazing, the spread of invasive grasses and annual burning are having a severe impact." It is considered "scarce and very local" overall and rare in Brazil.
