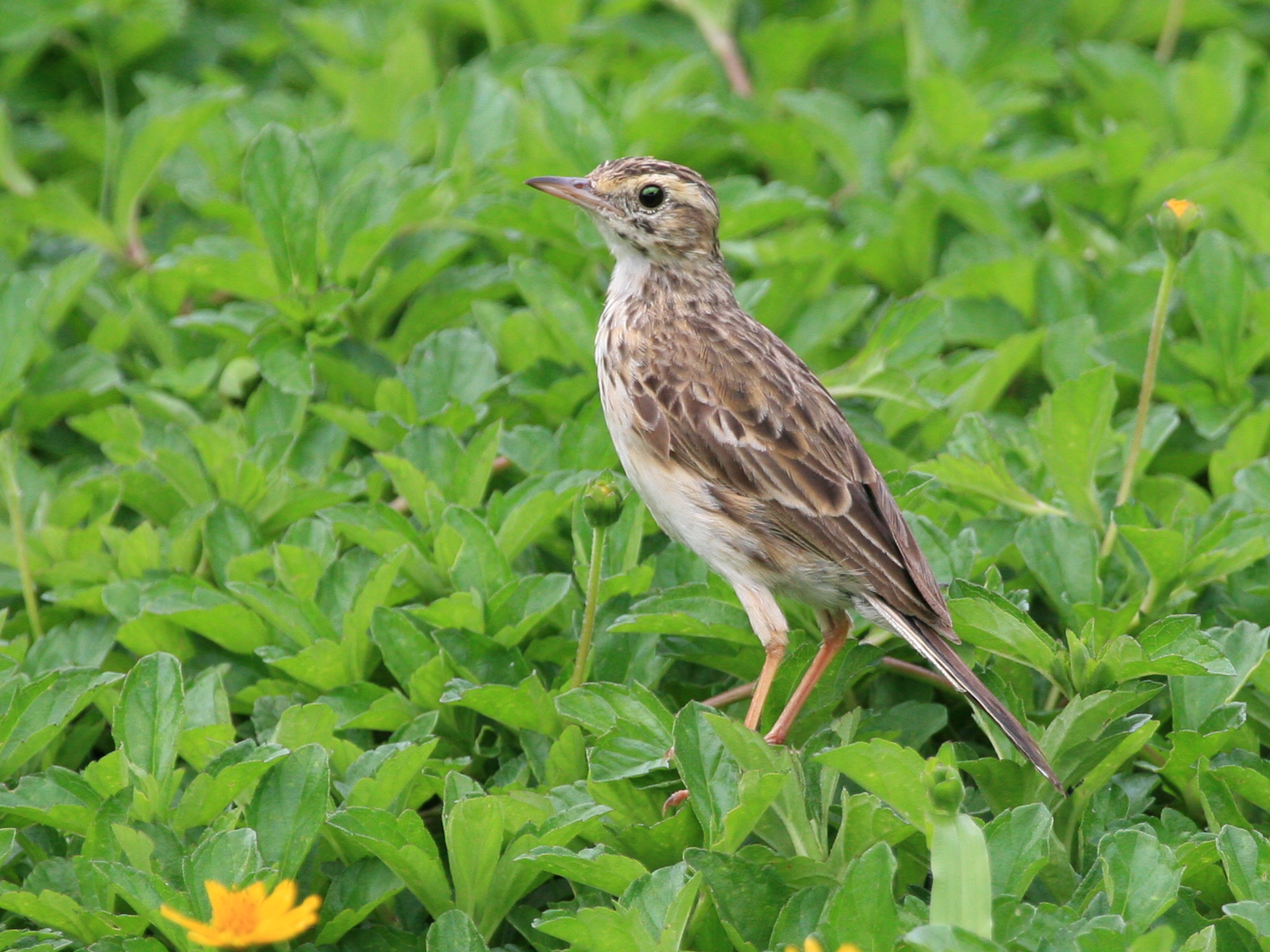

Scientific classification
- Domain: Eukaryota
- Kingdom: Animalia
- Phylum: Chordata
- Class: Aves
- Order: Passeriformes
- Family: Motacillidae
- Genus: Anthus
- Species: A. australis

Binomial name
- Anthus australis Vieillot, 1818

= Australian pipit =

Species of bird

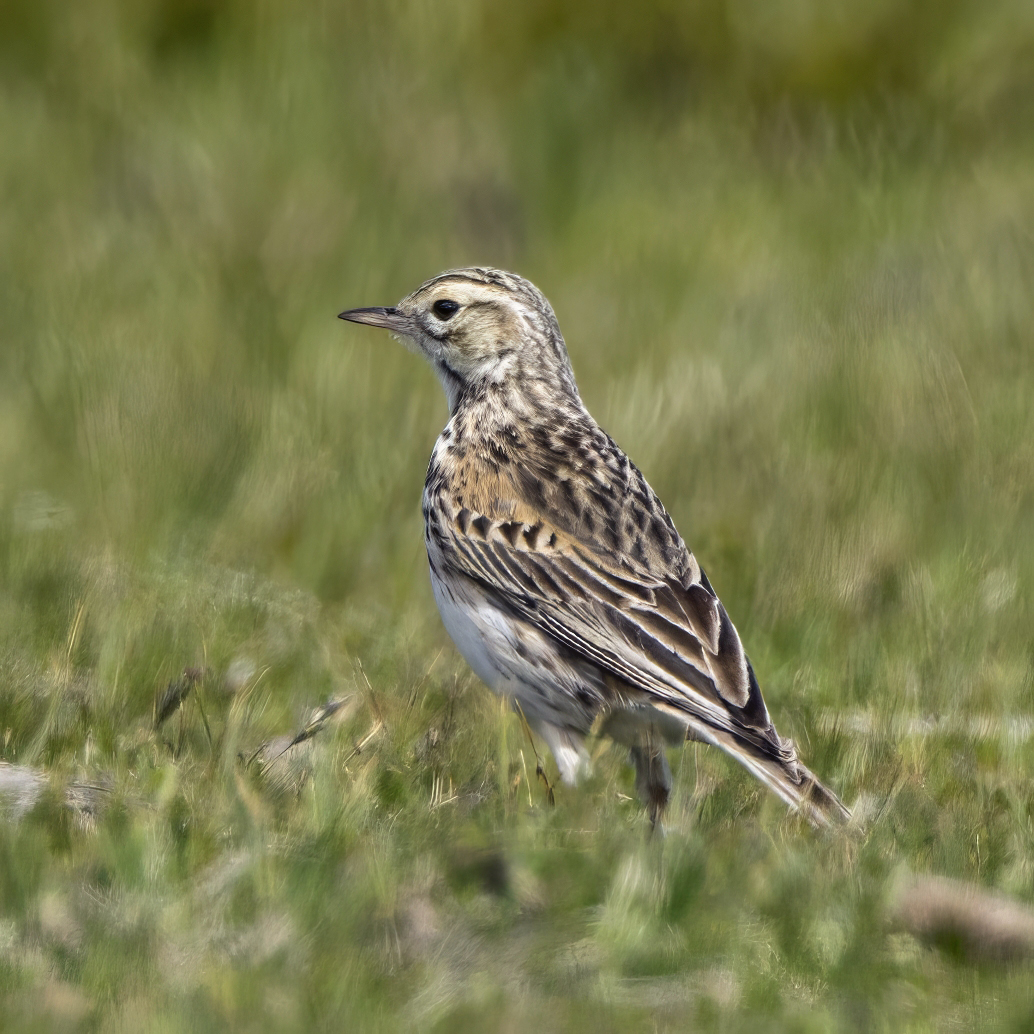
A. a. bistriatus, Tasmania

The Australian pipit (Anthus australis) is a fairly small passerine bird of open country in Australia and New Guinea. It belongs to the pipit genus Anthus in the family Motacillidae.

== Description ==
It is a slender bird, 16 to 19 cm long, and weighs about 40 grams. The plumage is pale brown above with dark streaks. The underparts are pale with streaks on the breast. There is a pale stripe over the eye and dark malar and moustachial stripes. The long tail has white outer-feathers and is often wagged up and down. The legs are long and pinkish-brown while the bill is slender and brownish.

It has a sparrow-like chirruping call and a drawn-out tswee call.

== Taxonomy ==
The Australian pipit was formerly grouped with other pipits as Richard's pipit Anthus novaeseelandiae. This species was split into Richard's, African, Mountain, Paddyfield and Australasian pipits. Many authors further split the Australasian pipit into two species: Australian pipit (Anthus australis) in Australia and New Guinea and New Zealand pipit (Anthus novaeseelandiae) in New Zealand.

A number of subspecies are recognised:

  - A. a. australis, A. n. bilbali & A. n. rogersi - mainland Australia
  - A. a. bistriatus - Tasmania
  - A. a. exiguus - New Guinea

== Ecology ==
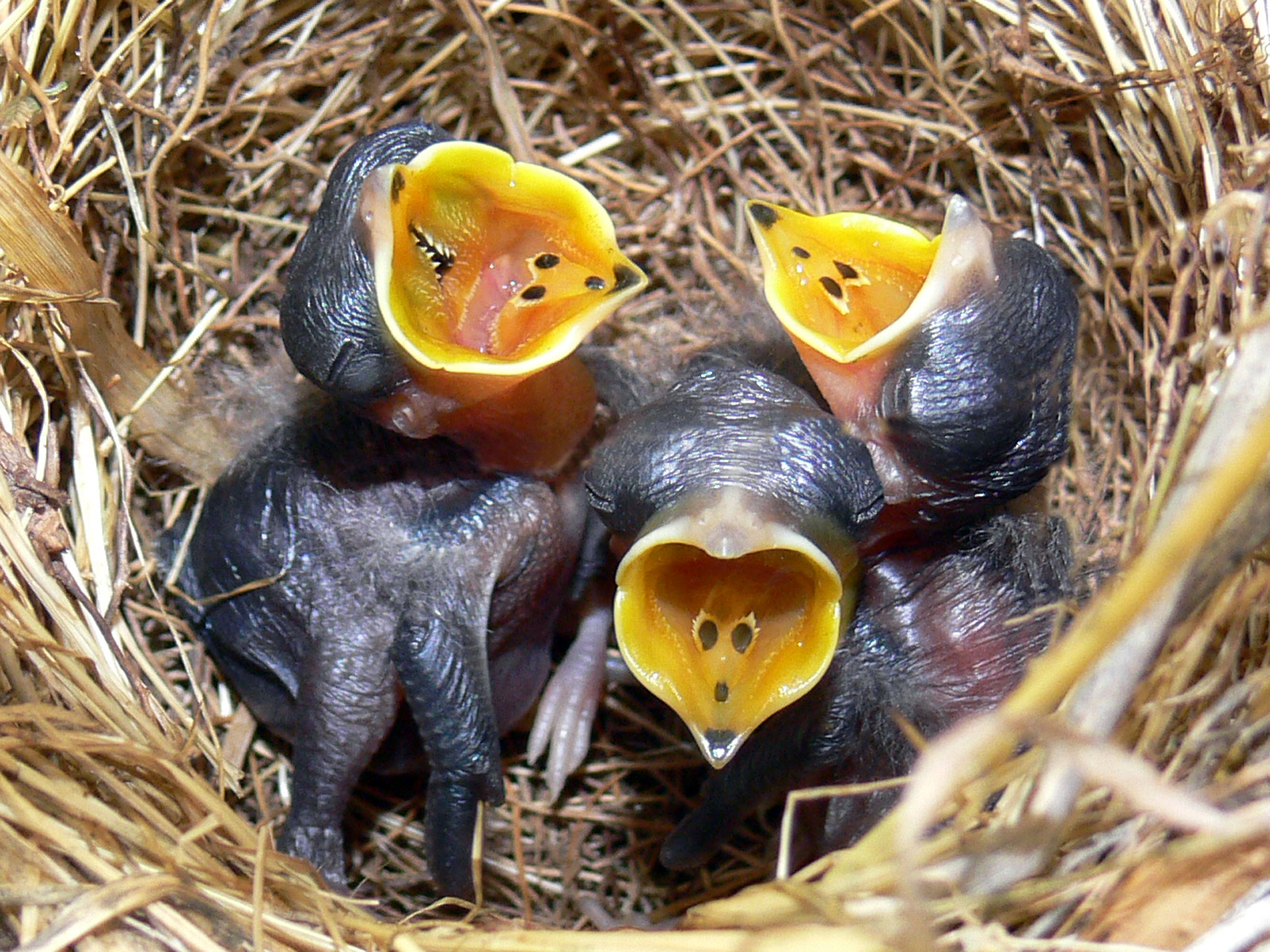
Chicks

It is a bird of open habitats such as grassland, farmland, roadsides, dry river beds, sand dunes and open woodland. It forages on the ground for small invertebrates such as beetles, spiders and insect larvae. It will also eat seeds such as those of grasses.

The breeding season begins in August. The cup-shaped nest is placed at the base of vegetation or in the shelter of a stone. It is made of grass and built by the female. Two to five eggs are laid, three or four being most common. They are buff-white with brown blotching and are incubated for 14 to 15 days. The young birds are fed by both parents and are able to fly after 14 to 16 days.
