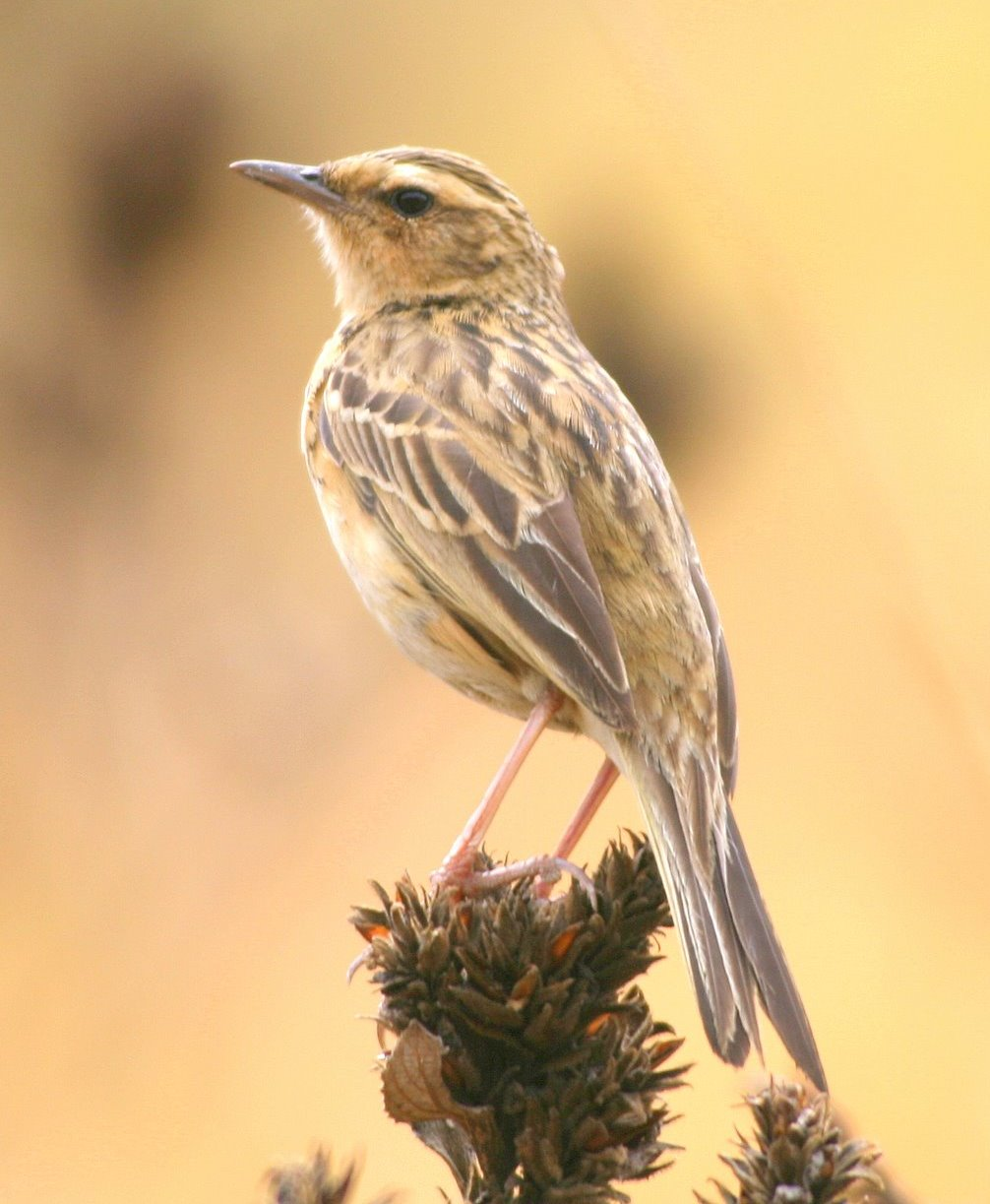

Conservation status
- Vulnerable (IUCN 3.1)

Scientific classification
- Kingdom: Animalia
- Phylum: Chordata
- Class: Aves
- Order: Passeriformes
- Family: Motacillidae
- Genus: Anthus
- Species: A. nilghiriensis

Binomial name
- Anthus nilghiriensis Sharpe, 1885

= Nilgiri pipit =

Species of bird

The Nilgiri pipit (Anthus nilghiriensis) is a distinctive species of pipit that is endemic to the high altitude hills of southern India. Richer brown in colour than other pipits in the region, it is distinctive in having the streaking on the breast continuing along the flanks. It is non-migratory and has a tendency to fly into low trees when disturbed and is closely related to the tree pipits Anthus hodgsoni and Anthus trivialis.

== Description ==
The Nilgiri pipit is about 12.6–14 centimetres (5.0–5.5 in) long and is richly coloured, has dark lores, a buff supercilium and throat. It lacks any malar stripes. The flanks, breast and sides of neck are brighter buff and that bill is completely dark. The crown is heavily streaked in black as are the upperparts. The outer tail feathers are also buff coloured and there is no white in the plumage. The streaking on the breast is fine and it extends along the flanks.

The first four primaries of the wing are almost equal and the fifth is about 1–2 mm shorter. The primaries from the second to the fifth are emarginate. The tail feathers are pointed and the second outer feather has a tapering triangle along the shaft and the third with a small triangle at the tip. Abnormal albino individuals have been reported.

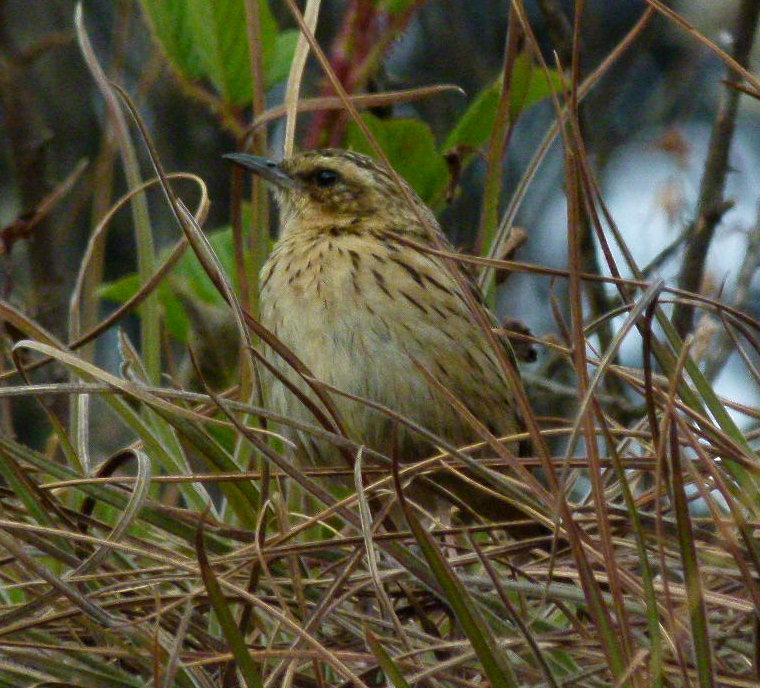
The streaking extends along the flanks

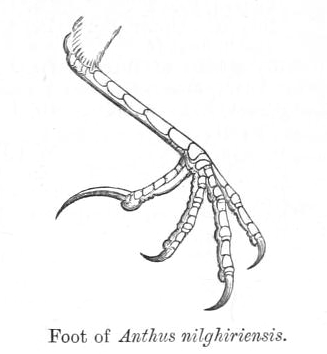
The hind claw is stout and curved

== Taxonomy ==
- - - - Anthus hodgsoni
      - Anthus trivialis
    - Anthus nilghiriensis
  - - Anthus gutturalis
    - Anthus ruficollis

Phylogeny of living relatives

The species was first described by Jerdon in 1840 under the name of Anthus rufescens, a name already used by Temminck for a different species. Blyth referred to it under the name of Anthus montanus. These are however invalid names and it was redescribed under replacement name of A. nilghiriensis by Richard Bowdler Sharpe in 1885.

The Nilgiri pipit is closely related to the tree pipits and is a sister to the clade containing Anthus trivialis and Anthus hodgsoni from which it diverged in the Pliocene.

== Distribution and habitat ==
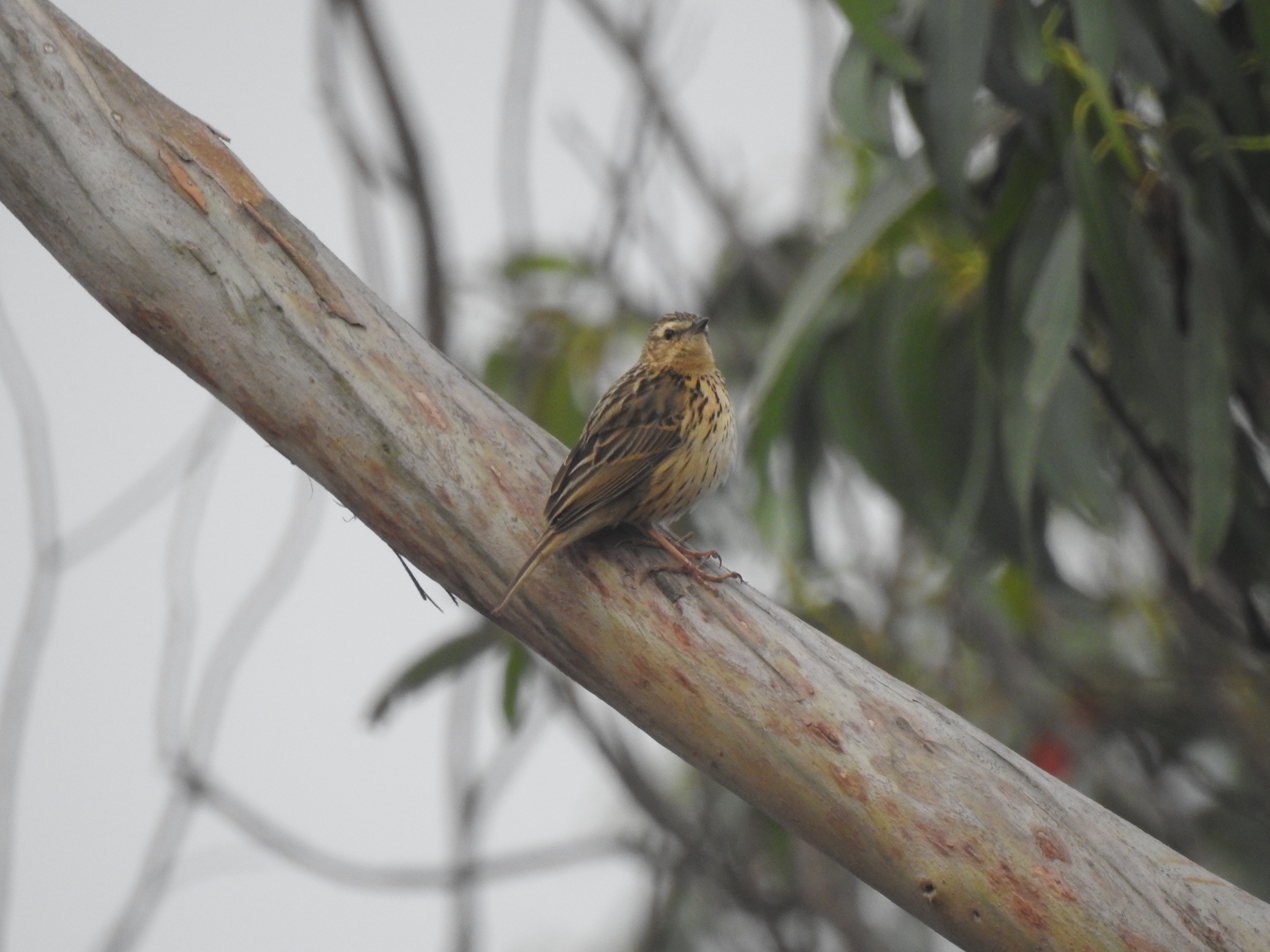
Nilgiri pipit in Kodaikanal Wildlife Sanctuary

The Nilgiri pipit is closely associated with short montane grasslands interspersed with marshy grounds and small streams mostly in hill slopes above 1,000 metres (3,300 ft) in the Ponmudi hills and above 1,500 metres (4,900 ft) in the Nilgiris, Palani and High Ranges. They have also been claimed to occur in the Kalakkad Mundanthurai Tiger Reserve but a 2014 study suggests that the species is restricted to the high altitude grassy peaks of the Nilgiris and the Anamalais. Museum specimens exist from the Palani ranges but habitat changes may have led to its reduction or extirpation as the species was not found in surveys in the 21st century.

== Behaviour ==
Nilgiri pipits are found singly or in pairs. When disturbed they usually fly into a low bush or tree. They breed in summer from April to July. The nest is a cup of grass in short grass. The clutch consists of two to three grey brown speckled eggs. They feed on grass seeds and insects with invertebrates becoming more important during the breeding season.

== Status ==
As of 2025, their total population is estimated to be between 2,200 – 4,400 mature individuals, with the upper bound based on a density estimate of about 0.1 birds per hectare in suitable habitat (440 km2). Their grassland habitat is threatened by wattle plantations and the colonization of grasslands by species such as broom (Cytisus scoparius) in the Nilgiris and by fire.
