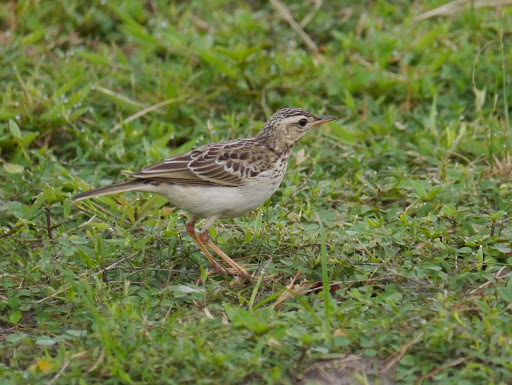

Conservation status
- Least Concern (IUCN 3.1)

Scientific classification
- Kingdom: Animalia
- Phylum: Chordata
- Class: Aves
- Order: Passeriformes
- Family: Motacillidae
- Genus: Anthus
- Species: A. pallidiventris

Binomial name
- Anthus pallidiventris Sharpe, 1885

= Long-legged pipit =

Species of bird

The long-legged pipit (Anthus pallidiventris), also known as the long-clawed pipit, is a species of bird in the family Motacillidae. It is found in Angola, Cameroon, Republic of the Congo, Democratic Republic of the Congo, Equatorial Guinea, and Gabon.

Its natural habitat is subtropical or tropical dry lowland grassland.

== Taxonomy ==
The long-legged pipit is divided into two subspecies with the following distribution:

- A. p. pallidiventris – occurs from Cameroon and Equatorial Guinea to Gabon and northwestern Angola
- A. p. esobe – occurs in central Congo-Kinshasa (upper Congo River)

== Description ==
The long-legged pipit, aptly named for its stilt-like legs and tall body. The beak is also relatively long. Its olive-gray plumage is distinctive, featuring a prominent moustache stripe, minimal chest streaking, and an unstreaked back. While it's the only pipit within its range during summer, it may mingle with other pipit species in winter. Even then, its long legs, minimal chest markings, and unstreaked back remain key identifiers.

Its song is a repetitive "tit-tidii"," and its calls include a "psip" contact call, a harsh "ptic-ptic", and a "poui-titit" flight call.

== Ecology ==
The long-legged pipit is found in natural grasslands, but also in pastures, farmland, airfields and in bare areas around villages and towns. Its diet consists of small grasshoppers and other flying insects, but also spiders. It forages on the ground, but can also jump up to catch flying insects. The pipit walks and runs with upright stance, constantly wagging tail up and down.

== Status ==
The species has a wide distribution range and the population is considered stable. The International Union for Conservation of Nature therefore categorizes it as "least concern".
