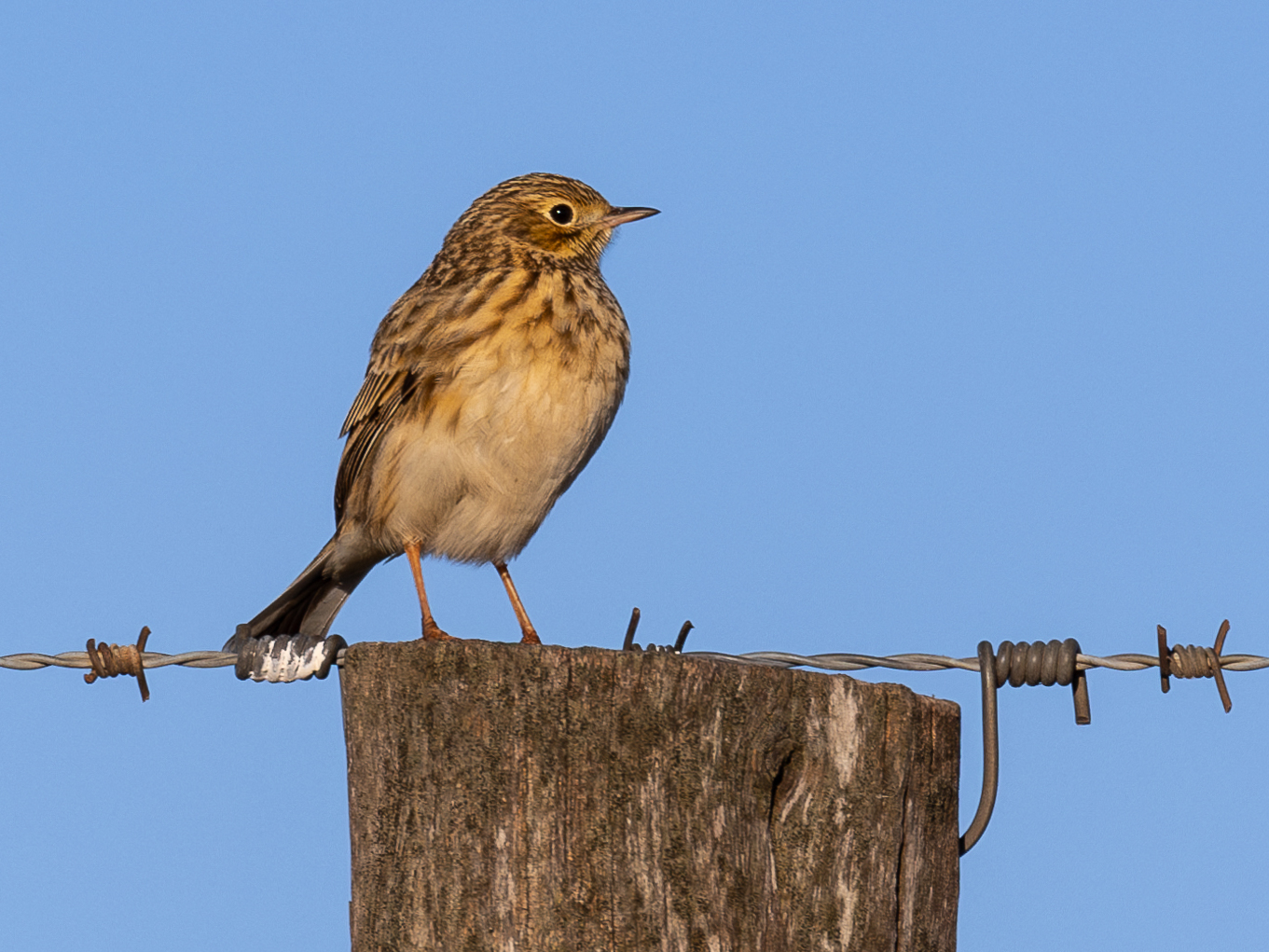

Conservation status
- Least Concern (IUCN 3.1)

Scientific classification
- Kingdom: Animalia
- Phylum: Chordata
- Class: Aves
- Order: Passeriformes
- Family: Motacillidae
- Genus: Anthus
- Species: A. chacoensis

Binomial name
- Anthus chacoensis Zimmer, 1952

= Pampas pipit =

Species of bird

The Pampas pipit (Anthus chacoensis) is a species of bird in the family Motacillidae, the wagtails and pipits. It is found in Argentina and Paraguay.

== Taxonomy and systematics ==
The Pampas pipit was described by John T. Zimmer in 1952 as a subspecies of the yellowish pipit (Anthus chii). After examining additional specimens of chacoensis and chii Zimmer concluded a year later that chacoensis deserved recognition as a full species. The species' first English name was Chaco pipit, and Campo pipit was proposed as an alternative. Because neither name accurately describes the species' range and primary habitat, the current "Pampas pipit" was adopted.

The Pampas pipit is monotypic.

== Description ==
The Pampas pipit is a very small member of its genus; it is about 14 cm (5.5 in) long. The sexes have the same plumage. Adults have a dark brown head with a pale area around the eye, a short dark "moustache", and a faint dark streak on the cheek. Their upperparts are dark brown with grayish feather edges that give a striped appearance. Their wings are blackish brown with pale buffy edges on the flight feathers. Their tail is mostly dark brown with mostly white outermost feathers. Their throat and underparts are white with dark spots on the breast and dark streaks on the flanks. They have a dark iris, a dark bill with a pinkish base to the mandible, and pinkish legs and feet.

== Distribution and habitat ==
The Pampas pipit is found from Concepción Department in east-central Paraguay south to south-central Buenos Aires Province in east-central Argentina. It nominally inhabits grasslands of the Pampas but is "now found almost entirely in agricultural fields!" (emphasis in original).

== Behavior ==
=== Movement ===
The Pampas pipit is a partial migrant. Much of the population that breeds in the southern part of its range migrates to the northern part for the non-breeding season. The species is found in Paraguay only as a non-breeding migrant.

=== Feeding ===
The Pampas pipit's diet has not been studied. It forages on the ground "in typical pipit fashion".

=== Breeding ===
Male Pampas pipits make a flight display that can reach 80 m (260 ft) above the ground and last more than an hour. Nothing else is known about the species' breeding biology.

=== Vocalization ===
The Pampas pipit sings during the flight display. Its song is a "long protracted series of more than 50 syllables, e.g. clicliclicliclidlidli… dlewdlew… dleeddleed… leecleeclee… cliclicli".

== Status ==
The IUCN originally in 1988 assessed the Pampas pipit as Threatened, then in 1994 as Near Threatened, and since 2000 as being of Least Concern. Its population size is not known but is believed to be stable. No immediate threats have been identified. It is considered fairly common. "Research [is] needed on its ecology and breeding behaviour."
