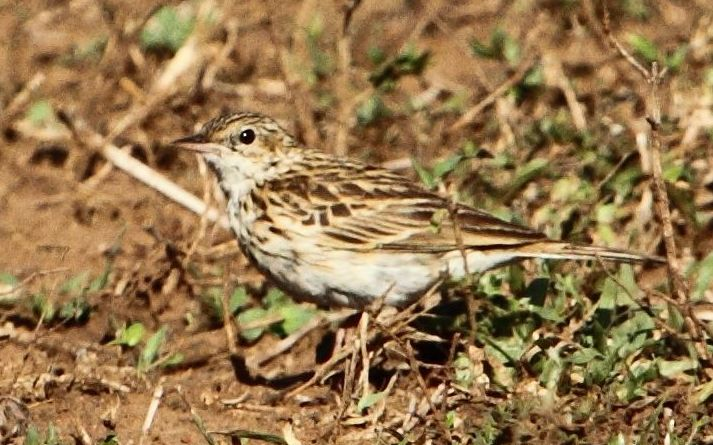

Conservation status
- Least Concern (IUCN 3.1)

Scientific classification
- Kingdom: Animalia
- Phylum: Chordata
- Class: Aves
- Order: Passeriformes
- Family: Motacillidae
- Genus: Anthus
- Species: A. caffer

Binomial name
- Anthus caffer Sundevall, 1850

= Bushveld pipit =

Species of bird

The bushveld pipit (Anthus caffer), also known as bush pipit or little pipit, is a species of bird in the pipit and wagtail family Motacillidae. It is found in Angola, Botswana, Eswatini, Ethiopia, Kenya, Malawi, Mozambique, South Africa, Tanzania, Zambia, and Zimbabwe. Its natural habitats are subtropical or tropical dry forests and dry savanna.

== Gallery ==
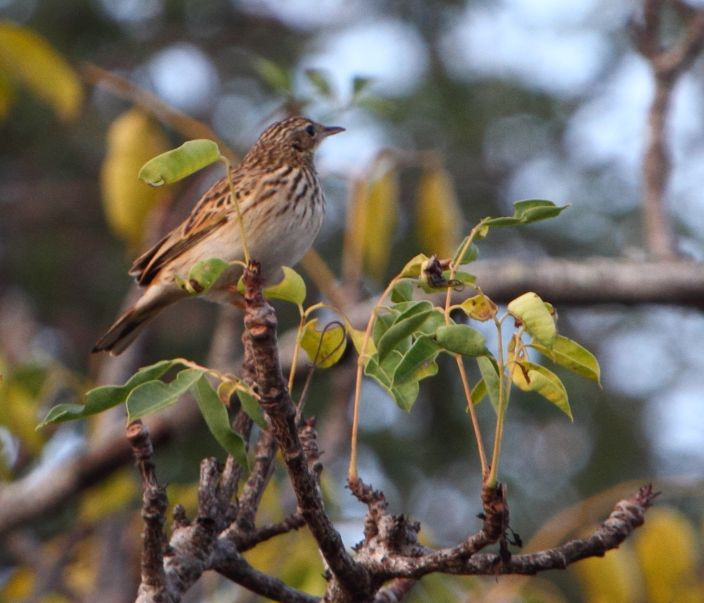

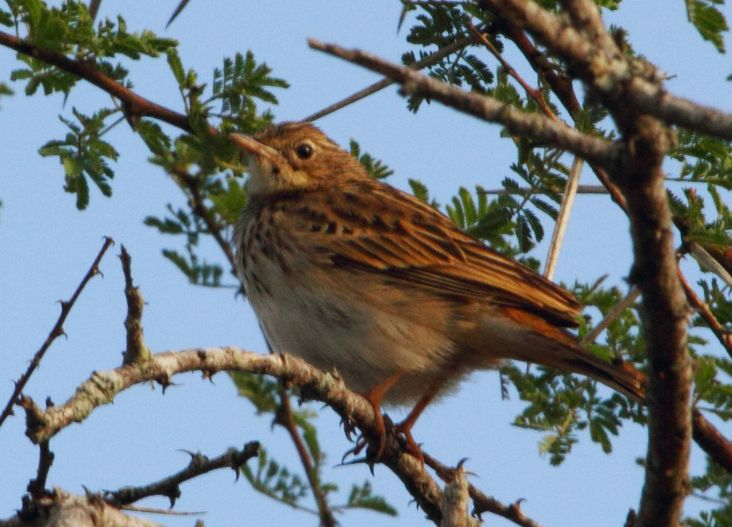

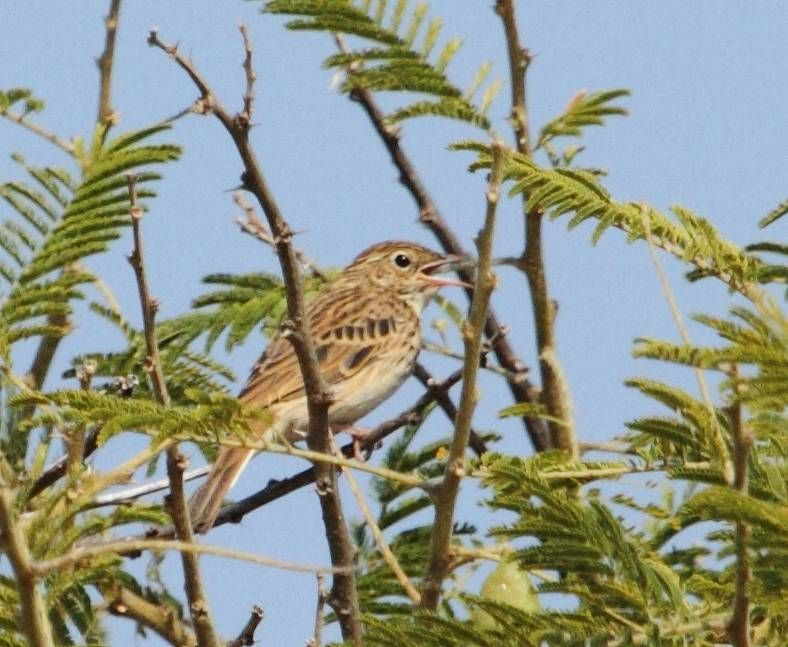

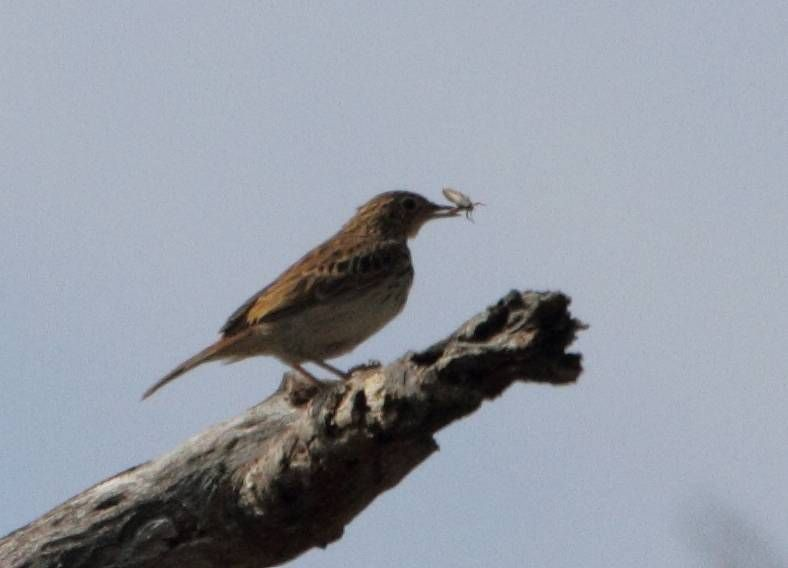

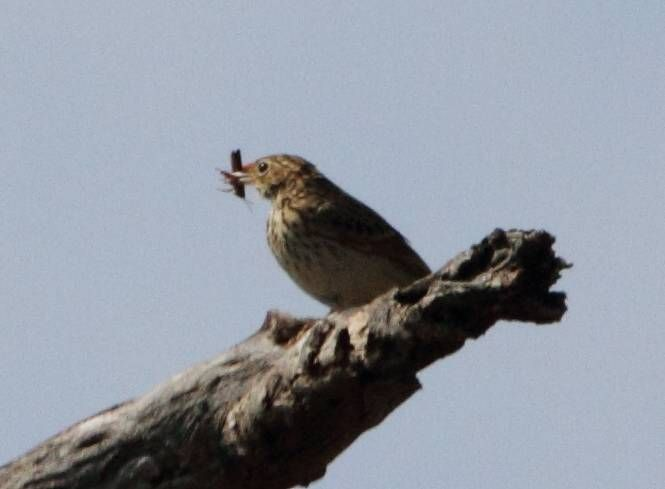
