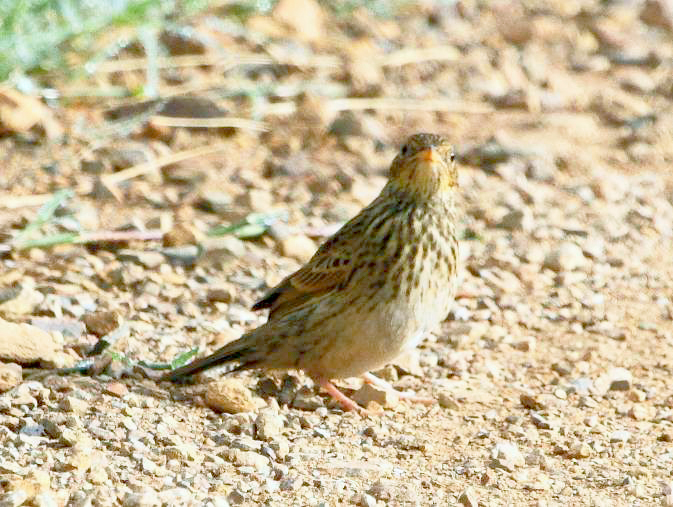

Conservation status
- Least Concern (IUCN 3.1)

Scientific classification
- Kingdom: Animalia
- Phylum: Chordata
- Class: Aves
- Order: Passeriformes
- Family: Motacillidae
- Genus: Anthus
- Species: A. brachyurus

Binomial name
- Anthus brachyurus Sundevall, 1850

= Short-tailed pipit =

Species of bird

The short-tailed pipit (Anthus brachyurus) is a species of bird in the family Motacillidae. It is found in Angola, Burundi, Republic of the Congo, Democratic Republic of the Congo, Gabon, Mozambique, Rwanda, Somalia, South Africa, Tanzania, Uganda, Zambia, and Zimbabwe. Its natural habitats are subtropical or tropical dry lowland grassland and subtropical or tropical seasonally wet or flooded lowland grassland.
