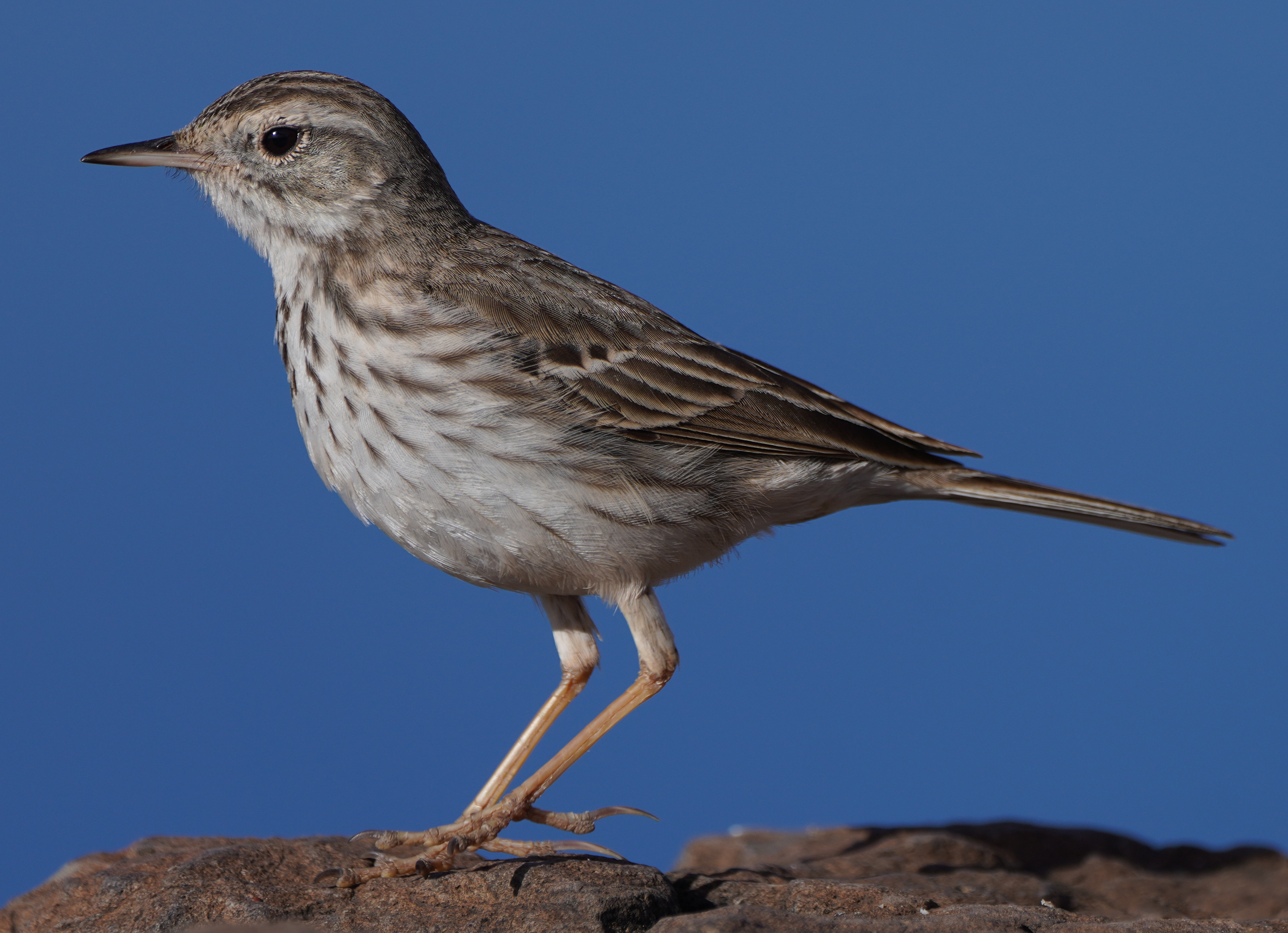

Conservation status
- Least Concern (IUCN 3.1)

Scientific classification
- Kingdom: Animalia
- Phylum: Chordata
- Class: Aves
- Order: Passeriformes
- Family: Motacillidae
- Genus: Anthus
- Species: A. berthelotii

Binomial name
- Anthus berthelotii Bolle, 1862

= Berthelot's pipit =

Species of bird

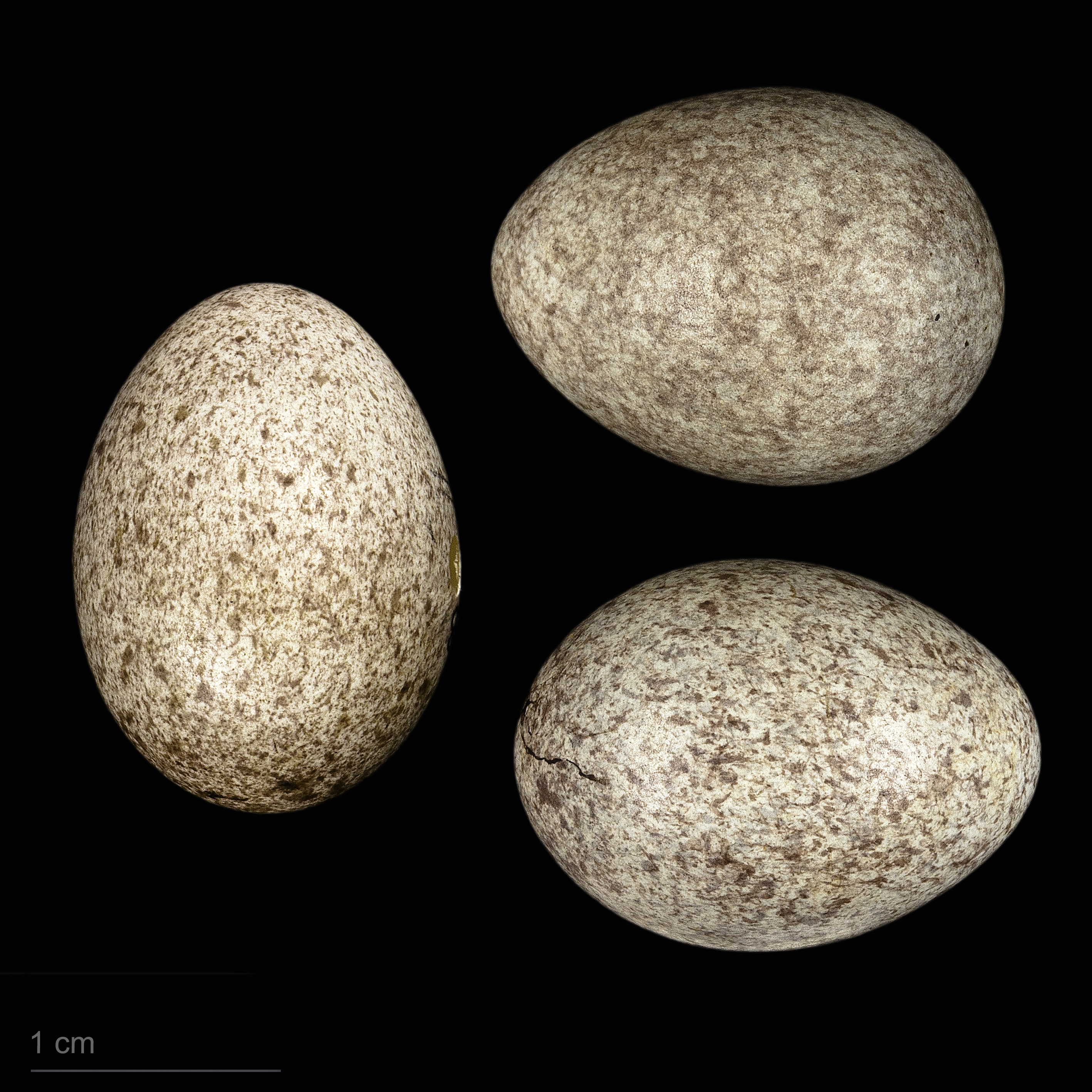
Anthus berthelotii - MHNT

Berthelot's pipit (Anthus berthelotii, English: /bɛərtəˈloʊ/ ber-tə-LOH, French: [bɛʁtəlo]) is a small passerine bird which breeds in Madeira and the Canary Islands. It is a common resident in both archipelagos.

Berthelot's pipit is found in open country. The nest is on the ground, with 3-5 eggs being laid.

This is a small pipit, 13–14 centimetres (5.1–5.5 in) in length. It is an undistinguished looking species on the ground, mainly grey above and whitish below, with some breast streaking. It has a whitish supercilium and eyering, with dark eye and moustachial stripes. The sexes are similar, but juveniles are browner than adults.

This species appears shorter tailed and larger headed than meadow pipit. Its call is a "schrip" like yellow wagtail, and the song, given in flight, is a chattery "tsivrr tsivrr tsivrr tsivrr".

This species is named after the French naturalist Sabin Berthelot, one-time resident of the Canary Islands, by Carl Bolle.
