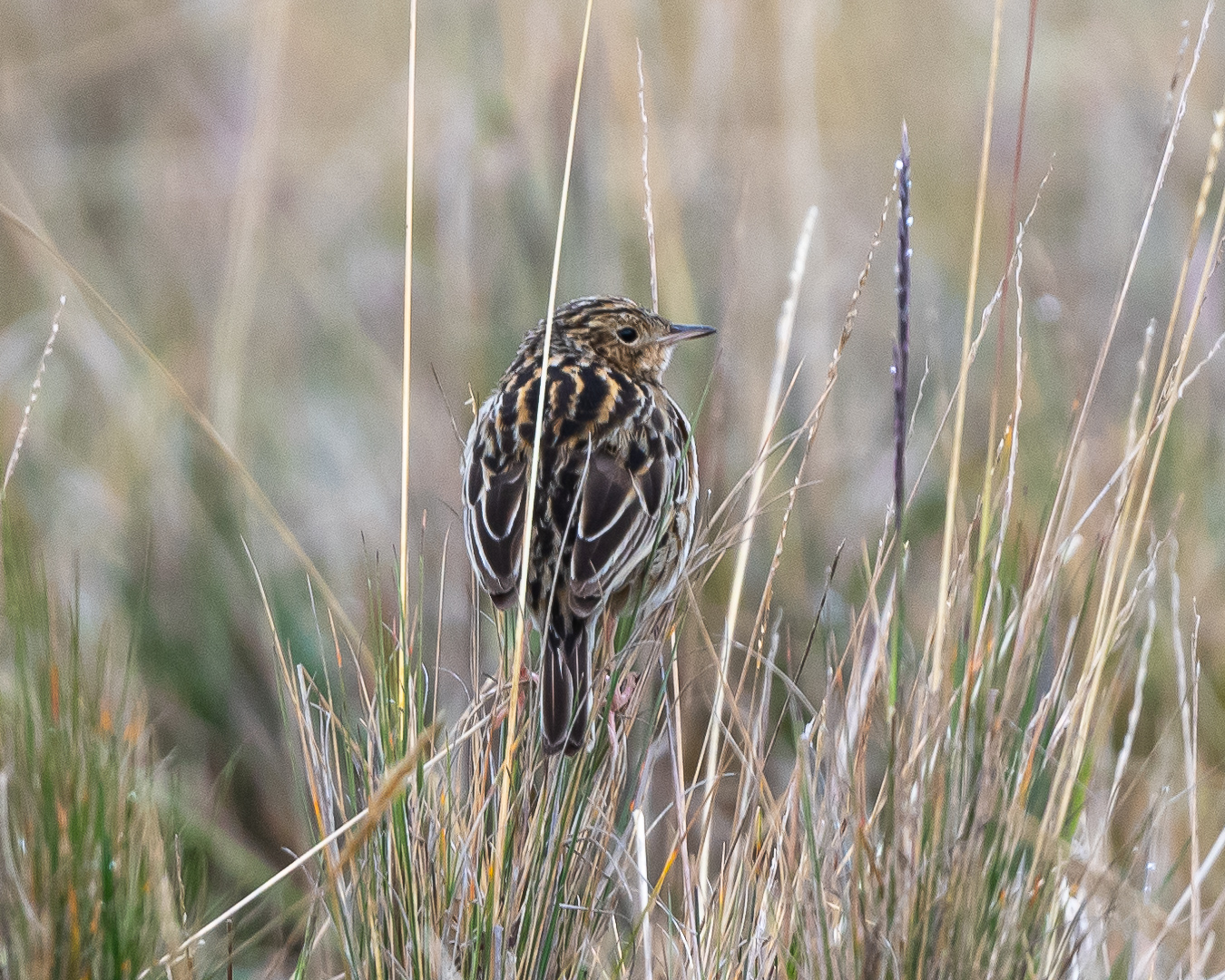

Conservation status
- Least Concern (IUCN 3.1)

Scientific classification
- Kingdom: Animalia
- Phylum: Chordata
- Class: Aves
- Order: Passeriformes
- Family: Motacillidae
- Genus: Anthus
- Species: A. bogotensis

Binomial name
- Anthus bogotensis Sclater, PL, 1855

= Paramo pipit =

Species of bird

The paramo pipit (Anthus bogotensis) is a species of bird in the family Motacillidae, the wagtails and pipits. It is found in Argentina, Bolivia, Colombia, Ecuador, Peru, and Venezuela.

== Taxonomy and systematics ==
The paramo pipit was described in 1855 with its current binomial Anthus bogotensis.

The paramo pipit has these four subspecies:

- A. b. meridae Zimmer, JT, 1953
- A. b. bogotensis Sclater, PL, 1855
- A. b. immaculatus Cory, 1916
- A. b. shiptoni (Chubb, C, 1923)

Some authors have suggested that A. b. meridae might deserve treatment as a full species. The Clements taxonomy recognizes some distinction within the species, calling it the "paramo pipit (meridae)" and the other three the "paramo pipit (bogotensis group)".

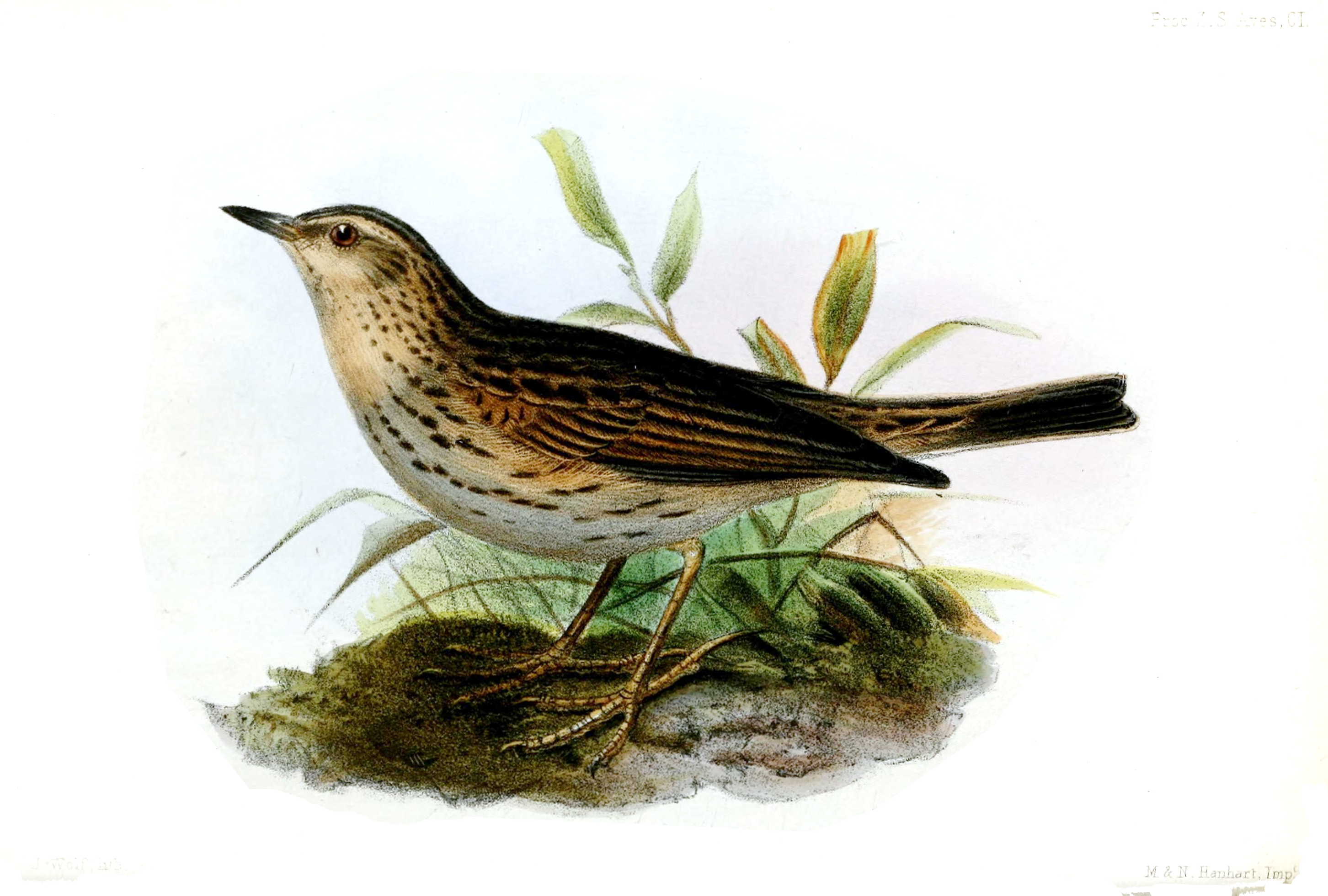
Illustration by Joseph Wolf, 1855

== Description ==
The paramo pipit is about 15 cm (5.9 in) long. The sexes have the same plumage. Adults of the nominate subspecies A. b. bogotensis have a dusky to cinnamon-brown head with a buffy supercilium and a thin white eye-ring. Their upperparts are dusky to cinnamon-brown with bold buff and blackish streaks. Their wing coverts are dusky with buffy tips that show as two thin wing bars. Their flight feathers are dusky with buffy brown edges. Their tail is mostly dusky. The outermost pair of feathers have a whitish outer web and a buffy inner web and the next pair inward (T5) have a whitish tip. Their throat is light buff and their underparts darker buff with sparse dark streaks on the breast and flanks. Subspecies A. b. meridae has wider wing bars than the nominate and buffy tips on T5. A. b. shiptoni has very faint wing bars and buffy white to white underparts that sometimes lack streaks on their sides. A. b. immaculatus is like shiptoni but with buffy white streaks on the crown and a buffy white supercilium. All subspecies have a brown iris, a dusky maxilla, a pale mandible, and pinkish legs and feet.

== Distribution and habitat ==
The paramo pipit has a disjunct distribution. The subspecies are found thus:

- A. b. meridae: Venezuelan Andes in northern Táchira, Mérida, and Trujillo
- A. b. bogotensis: from southern Táchira south intermittently through Colombia's Eastern and Central Andes, in the Andes through Ecuador, and on the Andes' western slope of northern Peru to Ancash Department
- A. b. immaculatus: east slope of the Andes from north-central Peru south to Bolivia's Cochabamba Department
- A. b. shiptoni: northwestern Argentina's Tucumán Province

The paramo pipit is a bird of open treeless landscapes, especially its namesake páramo and puna grasslands. It favors flatter areas with a mix of short grasses, bunch grass, and bogs, and also occurs in nearby pastures and cultivated land. In elevation it ranges between 2,200 and 4,100 m (7,200 and 13,500 ft) in Venezuela, between 3,100 and 3,600 m (10,200 and 11,800 ft) in Colombia, mostly between 3,000 and 4,000 m (9,800 and 13,100 ft) in Ecuador, and between 2,950 and 4,400 m (9,700 and 14,400 ft) in Peru.

== Behavior ==
=== Movement ===
The paramo pipit is a year-round resident but is thought to make some elevational movements between seasons.

=== Feeding ===
The paramo pipit feeds on insects and seeds. It forages singly, in pairs, and in small flocks, walking and running on the ground among grass, shrubs, and other low vegetation.

=== Breeding ===
The paramo pipit's breeding season has not been defined though it apparently includes March in the northern part of its range and November in Peru. Males make a display flight with a gliding descent. The species' nest is a cup made from grass and rootlets lined with finer materials and placed in a clump of grass on the ground. The clutch size, incubation period, time to fledging, and details of parental care are not known.

=== Vocalization ===
The paramo pipit sings during the aerial display, "a long, nasal, wheezy buzz followed by high, chattery notes, nyeeezzzzz, dziit-it, dziit-it, chit-it-it-it-it-it”. It sings a shorter and simpler version while perched on a rock or shrub.

== Status ==
The IUCN has assessed the paramo pipit as being of Least Concern. It has a very large range; its population size is not known and is believed to be stable. No immediate threats have been identified. It is considered locally fairly common in Venezuela, locally common in Colombia, and fairly common in Peru. It is uncommon to locally common in Ecuador.
