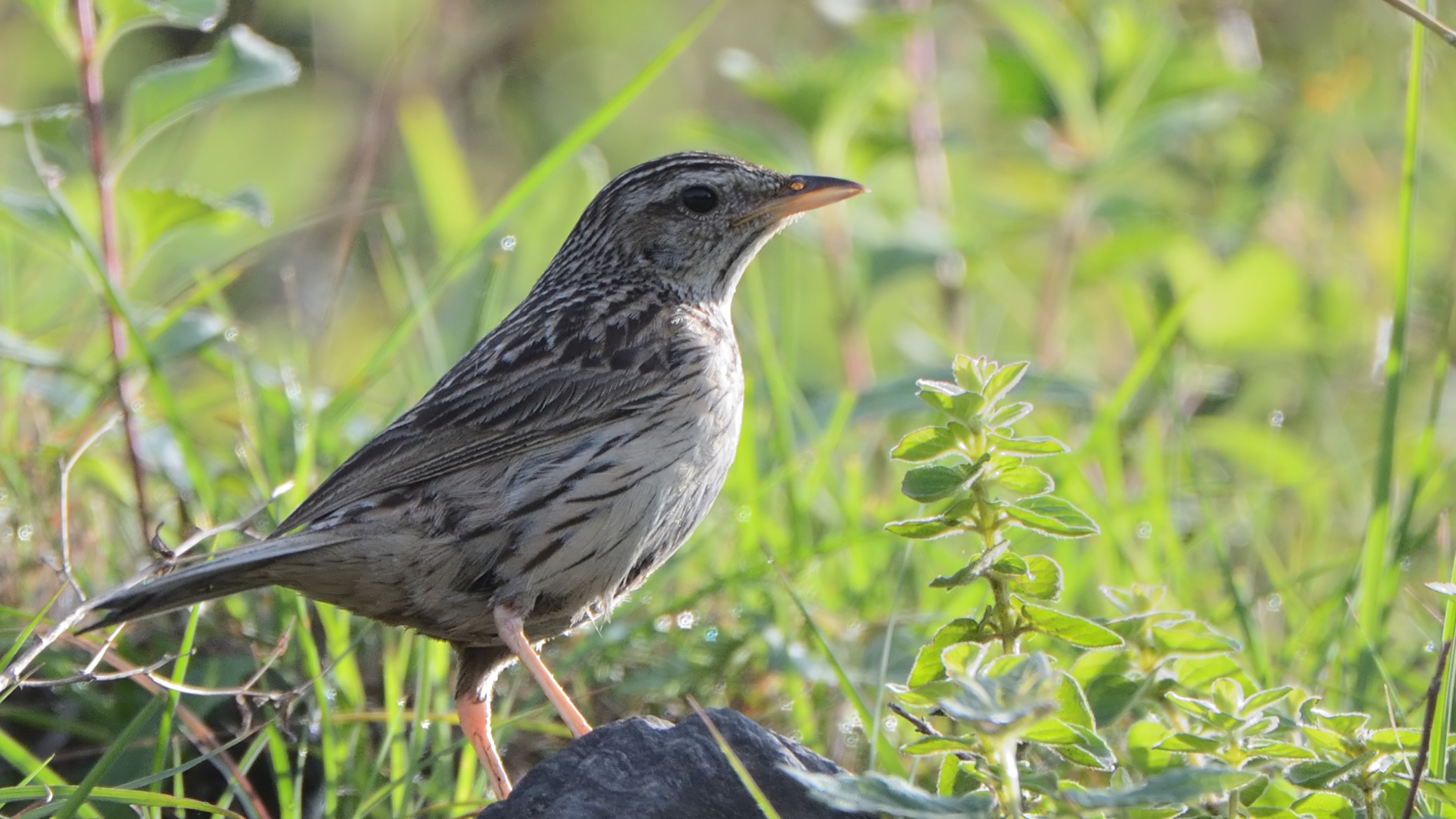

Conservation status
- Least Concern (IUCN 3.1)

Scientific classification
- Kingdom: Animalia
- Phylum: Chordata
- Class: Aves
- Order: Passeriformes
- Family: Motacillidae
- Genus: Anthus
- Species: A. sylvanus

Binomial name
- Anthus sylvanus (Hodgson, 1845)

= Upland pipit =

Species of bird

The upland pipit (Anthus sylvanus) is a species of bird in the family Motacillidae. It is found in Afghanistan, China, Hong Kong, India, Nepal, and Pakistan. As its name suggests, it inhabits mountains, typically open areas with grassland at elevations above 500m.

== Gallery ==
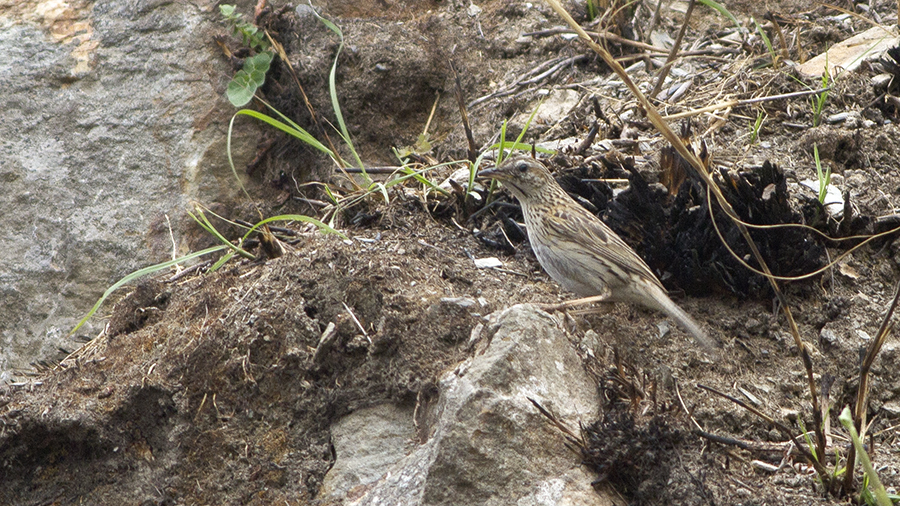
From Pangot village, Uttarakhand, India.

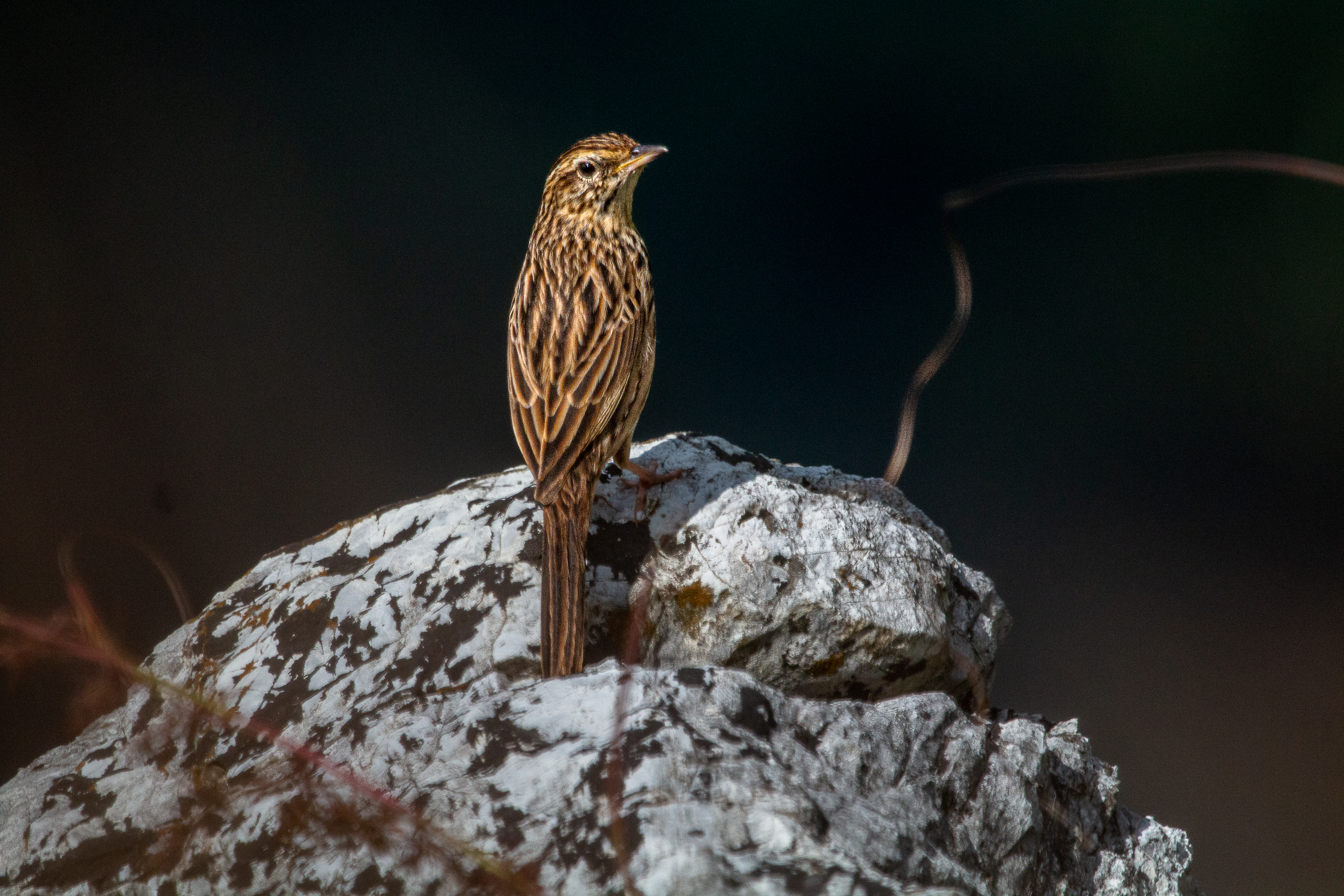
from Nepal
