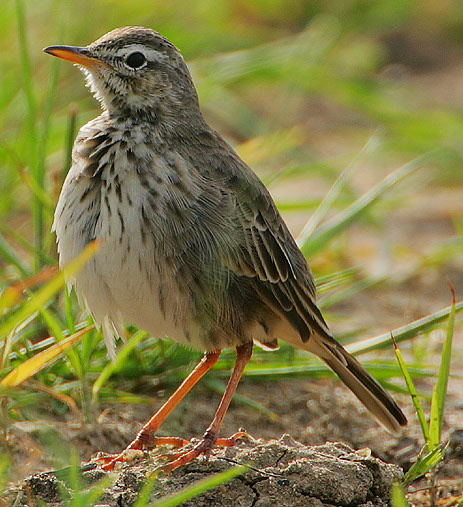

Conservation status
- Least Concern (IUCN 3.1)

Scientific classification
- Kingdom: Animalia
- Phylum: Chordata
- Class: Aves
- Order: Passeriformes
- Family: Motacillidae
- Genus: Anthus
- Species: A. melindae

Binomial name
- Anthus melindae Shelley, 1900

= Malindi pipit =

Species of bird

The Malindi pipit (Anthus melindae) is a species of bird in the family Motacillidae. It is found in Kenya and Somalia. Its natural habitats are subtropical or tropical dry lowland grassland and subtropical or tropical seasonally wet or flooded lowland grassland. It is threatened by habitat loss.
