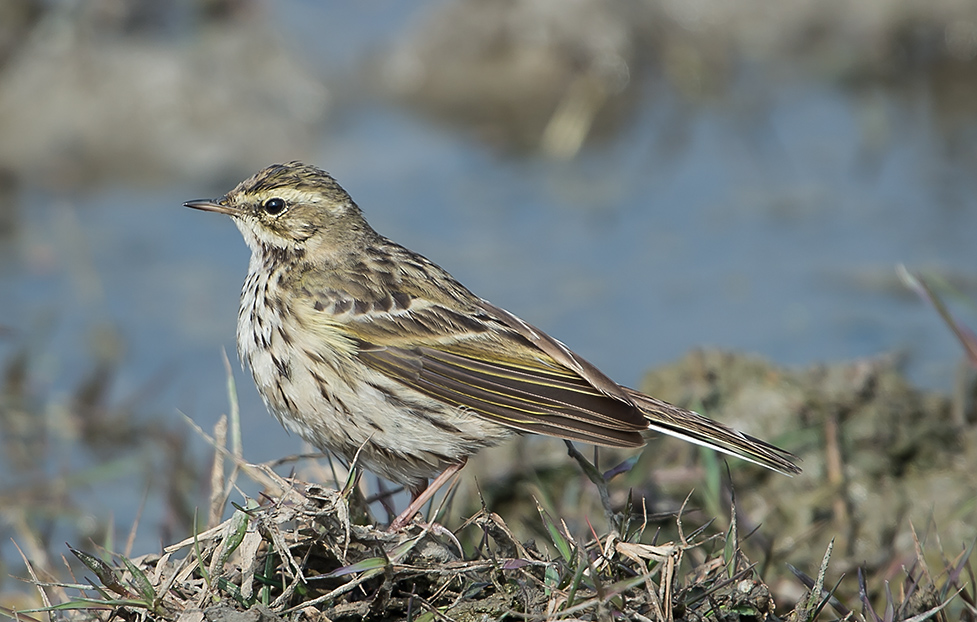

Conservation status
- Least Concern (IUCN 3.1)

Scientific classification
- Kingdom: Animalia
- Phylum: Chordata
- Class: Aves
- Order: Passeriformes
- Family: Motacillidae
- Genus: Anthus
- Species: A. roseatus

Binomial name
- Anthus roseatus Blyth, 1847

= Rosy pipit =

Species of bird

The Rosy pipit (Anthus roseatus) is a species of bird in the family Motacillidae. It is found in Afghanistan, Bangladesh, Bhutan, China, India, South Korea, Myanmar, Nepal, Pakistan, Thailand and Vietnam.

== Gallery ==
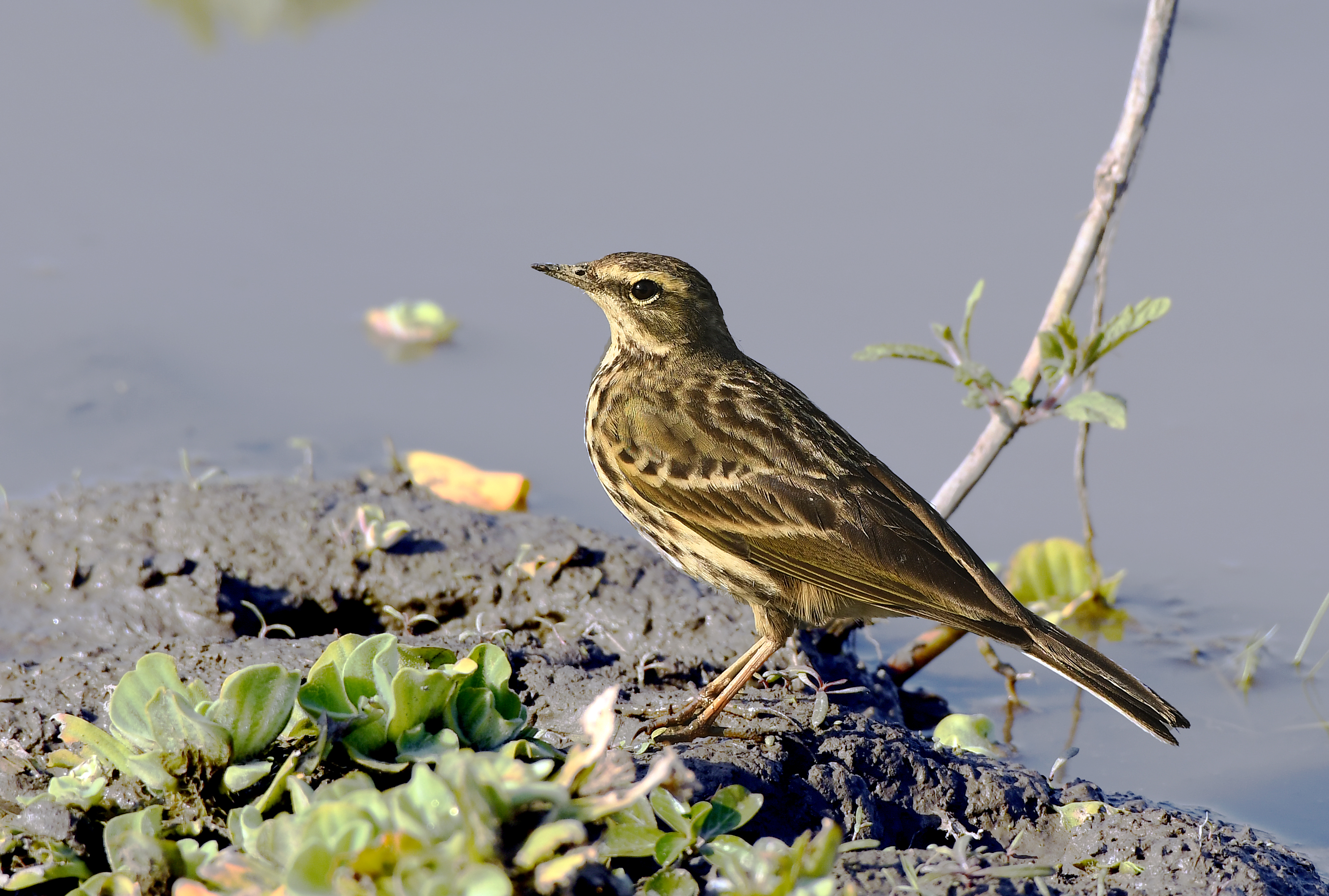
At Kaziranga National Park, Assam, India

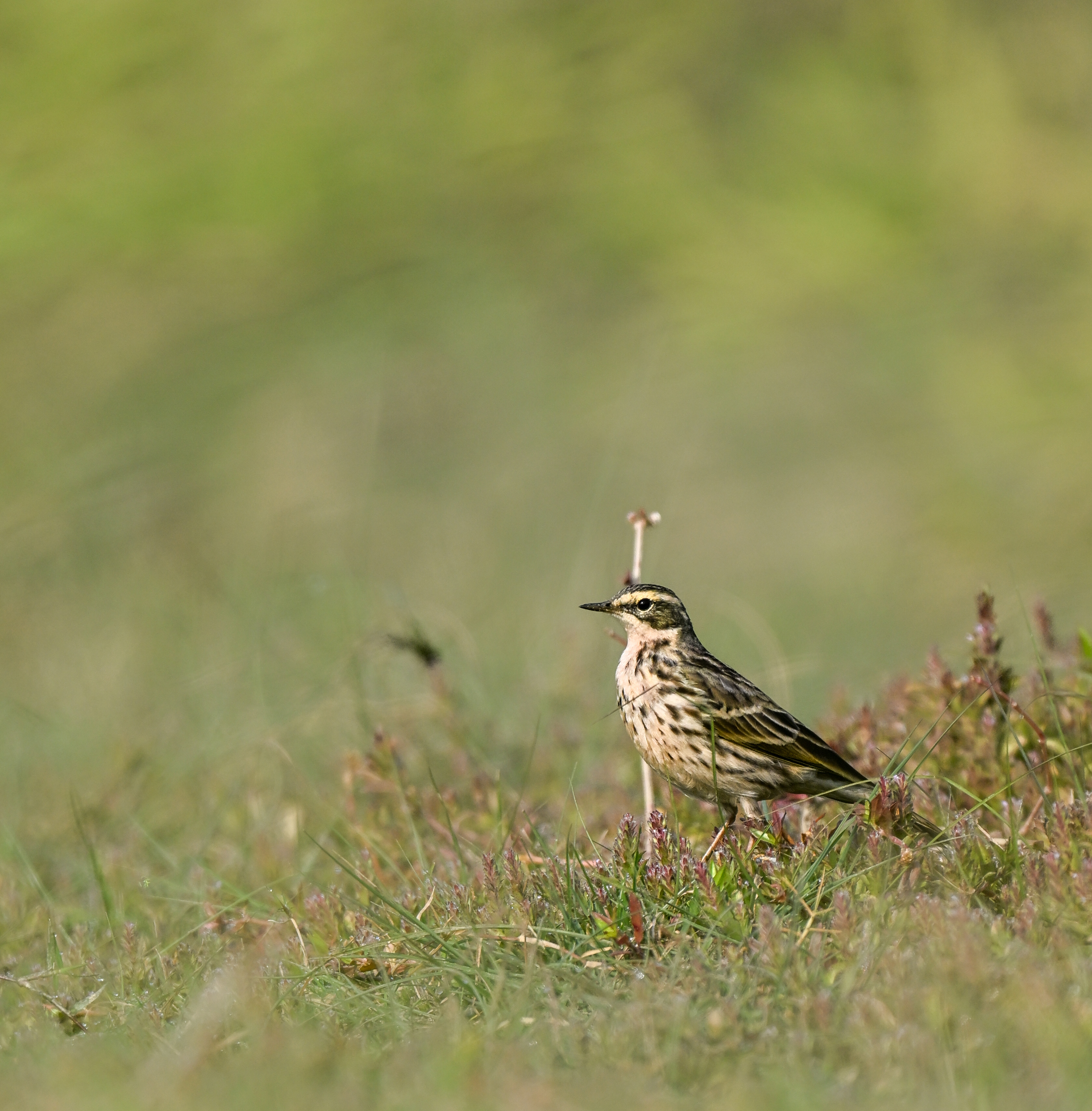
At Subansiri Grassland, Dhemaji District, Assam, India
