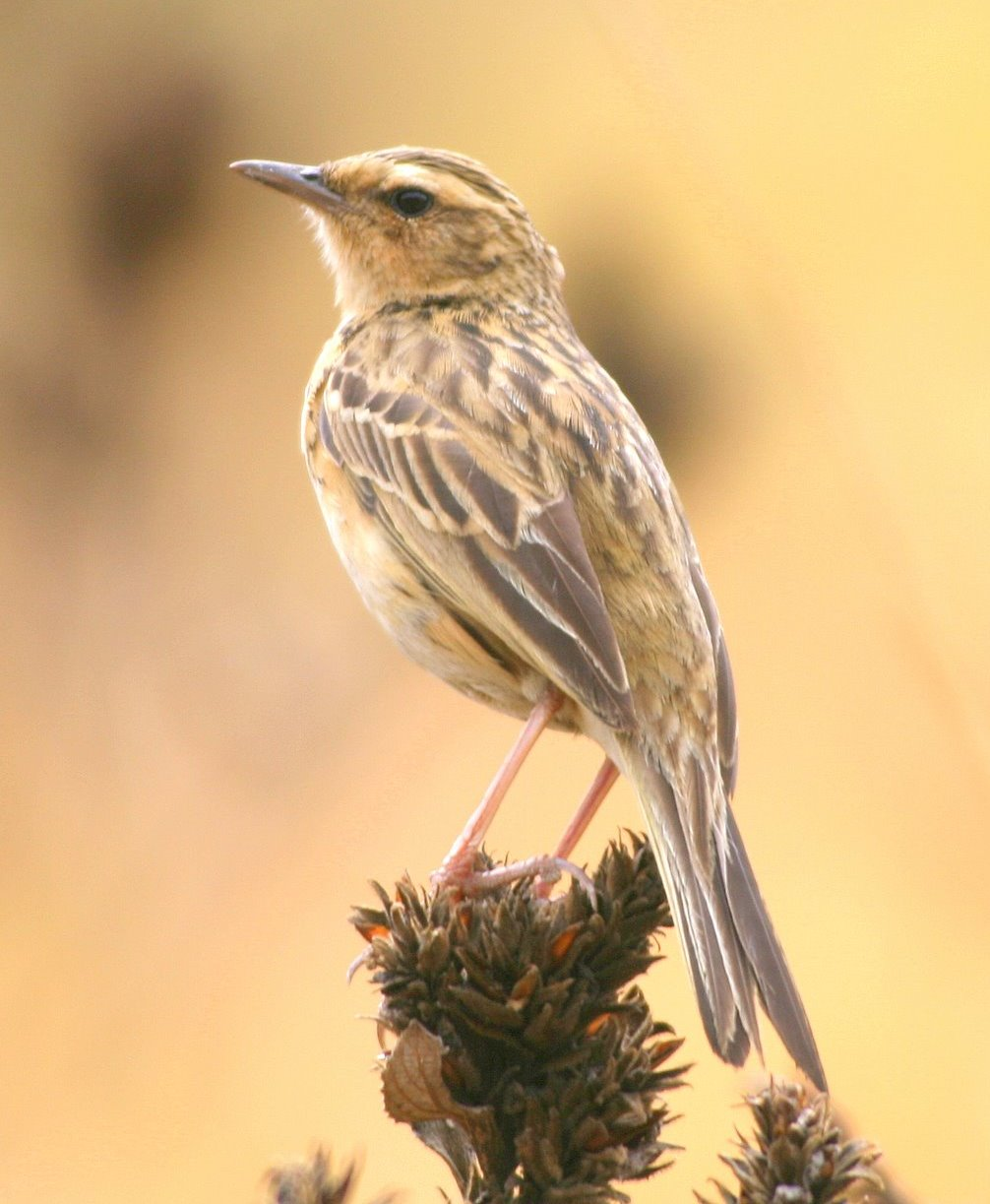
- Nilgiri pipit (Anthus nilghiriensis)

Scientific classification
- Kingdom: Animalia
- Phylum: Chordata
- Class: Aves
- Order: Passeriformes
- Family: Motacillidae
- Genus: Anthus; Bechstein, 1805

Type species
- Alauda pratensis Linnaeus, 1758

Species
- see text.

Synonyms
- Corydalla Vigors, 1825

= Pipit =

Pipits

Genus of birds

The pipits are a cosmopolitan genus, Anthus, of small passerine birds with medium to long tails. Along with the wagtails and longclaws, the pipits make up the family Motacillidae. The genus is widespread, occurring across most of the world, except the driest deserts, rainforest and the mainland of Antarctica.

They are slender, often drab, ground-feeding insectivores of open country. Like their relatives in the family, the pipits are monogamous and territorial. Pipits are ground nesters, laying up to six speckled eggs.

== Taxonomy and systematics ==
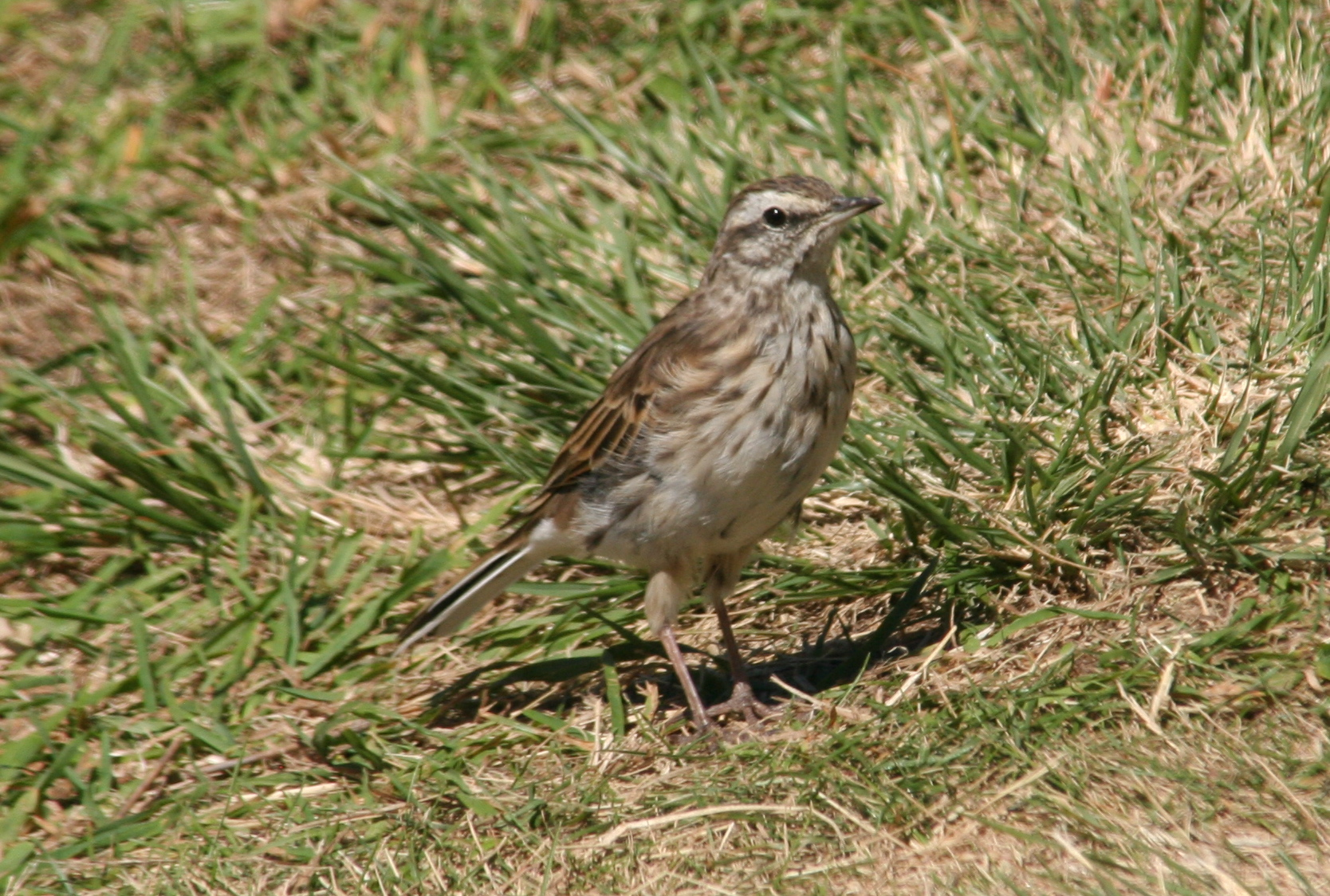
A New Zealand pipit Anthus novaeseelandiae. This species was formerly considered conspecific with the Australian pipit Anthus australis under the name Australasian pipit.

The genus Anthus was introduced in 1805 by German naturalist Johann Matthäus Bechstein. The type species was later designated as the meadow pipit. The generic name Anthus is the Latin word for a small bird of grasslands mentioned by Pliny the Elder.

Molecular studies of the pipits suggested that the genus arose in East Asia around seven million years ago (Mya), during the Miocene, and that the genus had spread to the Americas, Africa, and Europe between 5 and 6 Mya. Speciation rates were high during the Pliocene (5.3 to 2.6 Mya), but slowed down during the Pleistocene. Repeated dispersal between continents seems to have been important in generating new species in Eurasia, Africa, and North America, rather than species arising by radiation once a continent was reached. In South America, however, vicariance appears to have played an important role in speciation.

=== Extant species ===
The genus has more than 40 species, making it the largest genus in terms of numbers in its family. The exact species limits of the genus are still a matter of some debate, with some checklists recognising only 34 species. For example, the New Zealand pipit A. novaeseelandiae, which is currently treated as four subspecies found in New Zealand, formerly also included Australian pipit A. australis of Australia, Richard's pipit A. richardi of northern Asia, paddyfield pipit A. rufulus of southern Asia, and the African pipit A. cinnamomeus of Africa as subspecies. Conversely, it is also possible that the New Zealand subspecies found on its outlying Subantarctic Islands be split from the main islands species. In part the taxonomic difficulties arise due to the extreme similarities in appearance across the genus.

The family has an additional species, the golden pipit, Tmetothylacus tennelus, which belongs to a distinct, monotypic genus. This species is apparently intermediate in appearance between the pipits and the longclaws, and is probably more closely related to the longclaws. One species, the yellow-breasted pipit, is sometimes split out into a genus Hemimacronyx, which is considered to be intermediate between the longclaws and pipits. The split was originally proposed based on morphological features, but it has also found support based upon genetic analysis.

== Description ==
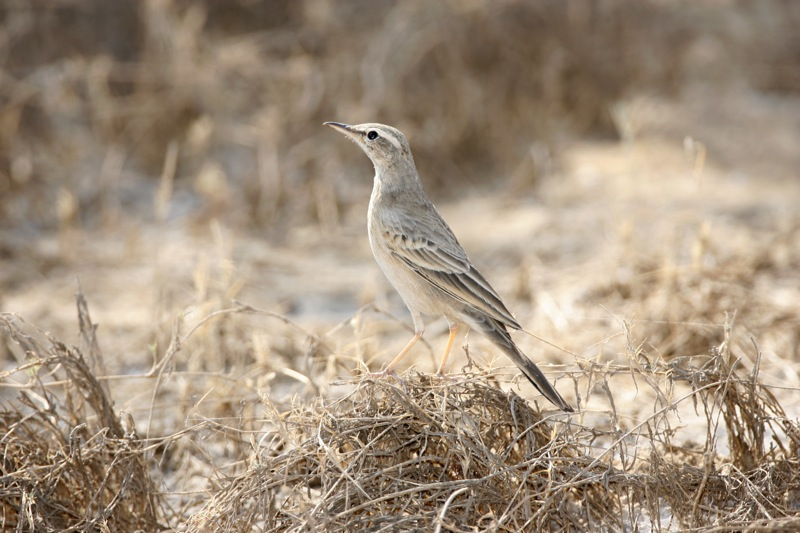
The plumage colour of the long-billed pipit is typical of the genus, although this subspecies lacks the extensive streaking many other pipits, including other subspecies, have on the breast

The pipits are generally highly conservative in appearance. They are generally 16–21 cm (6.3–8.3 in) in length, although the smallest species, the short-tailed pipit, is only 11.5–12.5 cm (4.5–4.9 in). In weight, they range from 15–40 g (0.53–1.41 oz). The largest species may be the alpine pipit. Like all members of the family, they are slender, short-necked birds with long tails and long, slender legs with elongated (in some cases very elongated) hind claws. The length of the hind claw varies with the habits of the species, more arboreal species have shorter, more curved hind claws than the more terrestrial species. The bills are generally long, slender, and pointed. In both size and plumage, few differences are seen between the sexes. One unusual feature of the pipits, which they share in common with the rest of their family, but not the rest of the passerines, is that the tertials on the wing entirely cover the primary flight feathers. This is thought to be a feature to protect the primaries, which are important to flight, from the sun, which causes the feathers to fade and become brittle if not protected.

The plumage of the pipits is generally drab and brown, buff, or faded white. The undersides are usually darker than the top, and a variable amount of barring and streaking is seen on the back, wings, and breast. The drab, mottled-brown colours provide some camouflage against the soil and stones on which they are generally found. A few species have slightly more colourful breeding plumages; for example, the rosy pipit has greenish edges on the wing feathers. The yellow-breasted pipit, if it is retained in this genus, is quite atypical in having bright yellow plumage on the throat, breast, and belly.

Pipits are morphologically similar to some larks, but the two groups are quite distantly related; the lark family Alaudidae is part of the superfamily Sylvioidea, rather than the Passeroidea, where the pipits are placed. Morphological differences between the two groups of birds are, in fact, plentiful. Anatomical differences include a differently structured syrinx, differences in the structure of the tarsi, and in many lark genera, the presence of a distinct 10th primary, a fourth tertial, and feathers at least partially covering the nostrils. Bill shape differs between larks and pipits, with larks having an evenly sloping culmen, whereas most pipits have a small hump over the nostrils, and lark bills are generally heavier, reflecting differences in diet. Differences occur in the feather tracts of the two groups; while many larks have crests, no pipit does; pipits have only one prominent row of scapulars, whereas larks have two.

== Distribution and habitat ==
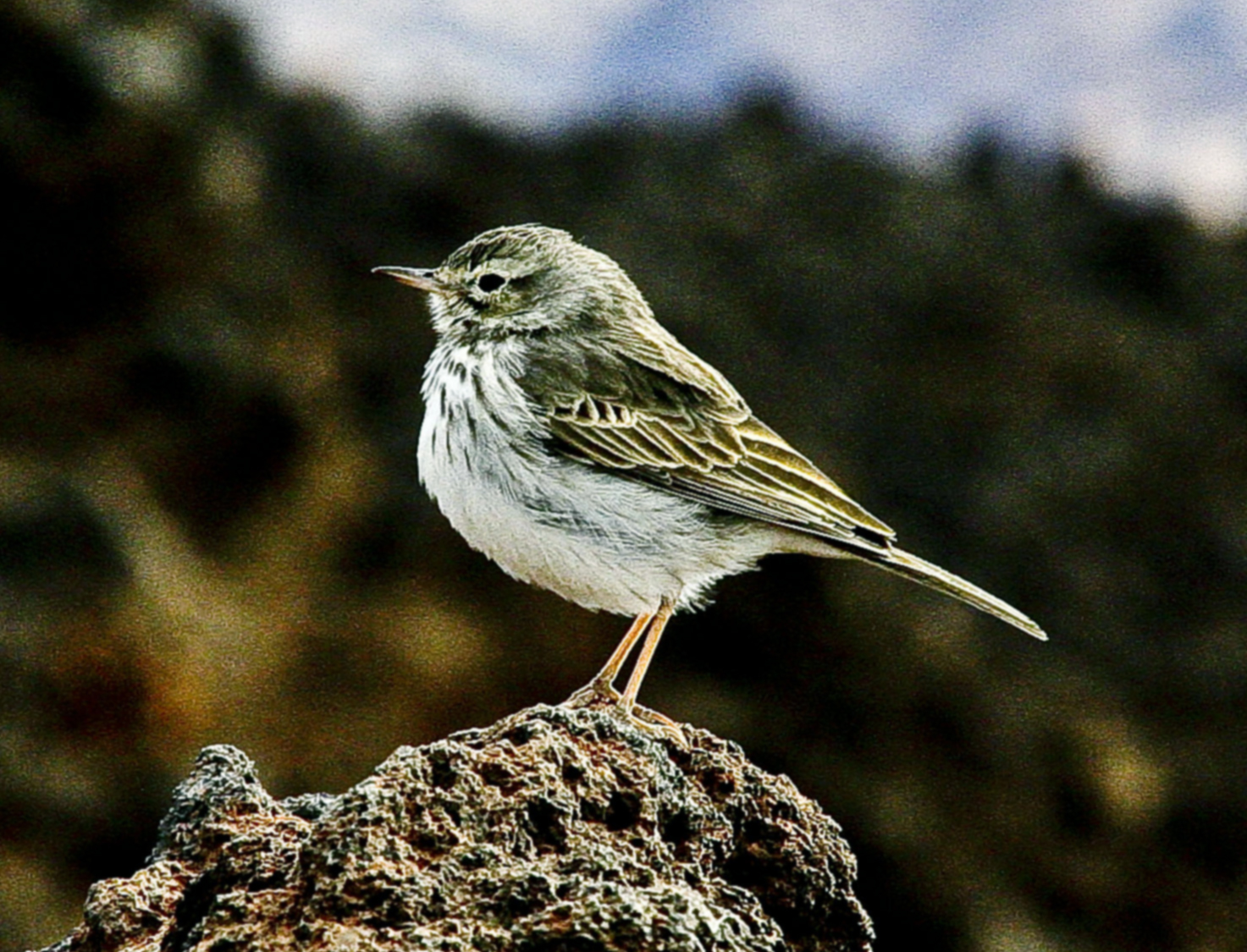
Berthelot's pipit is restricted to the Atlantic islands of Madeira and the Canary Islands

The pipits have a cosmopolitan distribution, occurring across most of the world's land surface. They are the only genus in their family to occur widely in the Americas (two species of wagtails marginally occur in Alaska, as well). Three species of pipits occur in North America, and seven species occur in South America. The remaining species are spread throughout Eurasia, Africa, and Australia, along with two species restricted to islands in the Atlantic. Some six species occur on more than one continent.

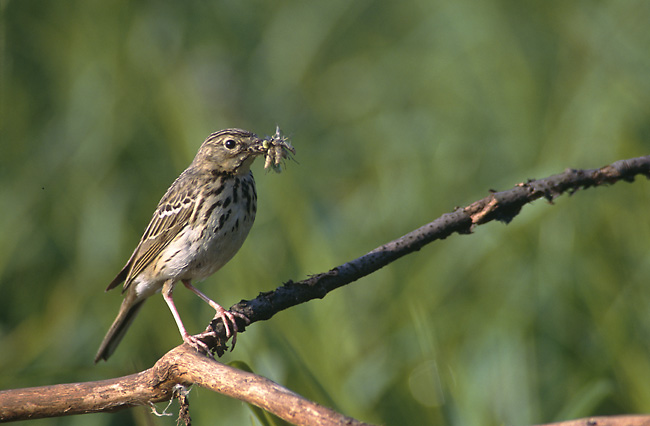
The tree pipit breeds in Europe and Northern Asia and winters in India and Africa.

As might be expected from a genus with such a wide distribution, the pipits are found in an equally wide range of habitats. They occur in most types of open habitat, although they are absent from the very driest deserts. They are mostly associated with some kind of grassland, from sea-level to alpine tundra. The rock pipit and South Georgia pipit are found in the rocks and cliffs of the seashore, whereas several species are restricted (for part of the year in some cases) to alpine areas. The family also ranges from the northern tundra and the subantarctic islands of New Zealand and the South Georgia group to the tropics. They are absent from tropical rainforest, but a few species are associated with open woodland, for example the wood pipit of southern Africa, which is found in open woodland savanna and miombo woodland.

The pipits range from entirely sedentary to entirely migratory. Insular species such as Berthelot's pipit, which is endemic to Madeira and the Canary Islands, are entirely sedentary, as are some species in warmer areas like the Nilgiri pipit. Other species are partly nomadic during the nonbreeding season, like the long-legged pipit of central Africa or the ochre-breasted pipit of South America. These seasonal movements are in response to conditions in the environment, and are poorly understood and unpredictable. Longer, more regular migrations between discrete breeding and wintering grounds are undertaken by several species. The tree pipit, which breeds in Europe and northern Asia, winters in Asia and sub-Saharan Africa, a pattern of long-distance migration shared with other northerly species. Species may also be partly migratory, with northern populations being migratory but more temperate populations being resident (such as the meadow pipit in Europe). The distances involved do not have to be that long; the mountain pipit of southern Africa breeds in the Drakensberg of South Africa and migrates north only as far as Angola and Zambia. Migration is usually undertaken in groups and may happen both during the day and at night. Some variation happens in this, for example, Sprague's pipit of North America apparently only migrates by day.

== Behaviour and ecology ==
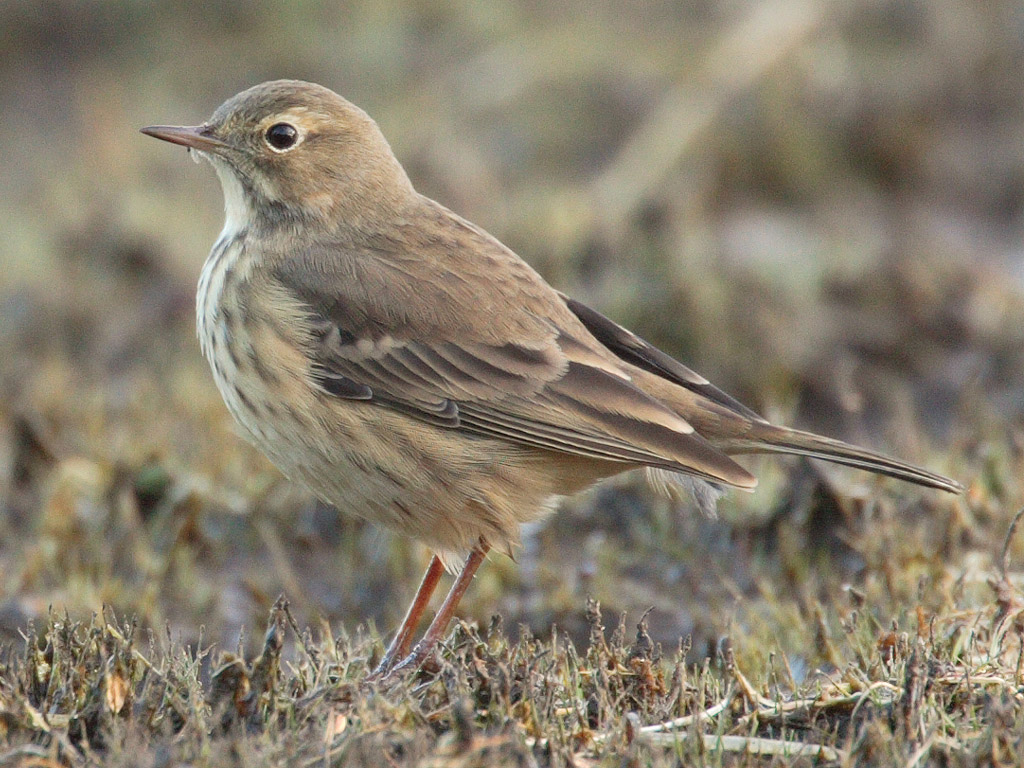
American pipits will wag their tail from side to side as well as up and down

The pipits are active terrestrial birds that usually spend most of their time on the ground. They will fly in order to display during breeding, while migrating and dispersing, and also when flushed by danger. A few species make use of trees, perching in them and flying to them when disturbed. Low shrubs, rocks and termite nests may also be used as vantage points. Like their relatives the wagtails, pipits engage in tail-wagging. The way in which a pipit does this can provide clues to its identity in otherwise similar looking species. Upland pipits, for example, flick their tails quite quickly, as opposed to olive-backed pipits which wag their tails more gently. In general pipits move their tails quite slowly. The American pipit wags its tail both up and down and from side to side. The exact function of tail-wagging is unclear; in the related wagtails it is thought to be a signal to predators of vigilance.

=== Feeding ===
The diet of the pipits is dominated by small invertebrates. Insects are the most important prey items; among the types taken include flies and their larvae, beetles, grasshoppers and crickets, true bugs, mantids, ants, aphids and particularly the larvae and adults of moths and butterflies. Outside of insects other invertebrates taken include spiders and, rarely, worms and scorpions. They are generally catholic in their diet, the composition of their diet apparently reflecting the abundance of their prey in the location (and varying with the season). The diet consumed by adults may vary to that of the young birds; for example adult tree pipits take large numbers of beetles but do not feed many to their chicks. Species feeding on the seashore are reported to feed on marine crustaceans and molluscs. A few species have been reported to feed on small fish, beating them in the manner of a kingfisher having caught them. Rock pipits have also been observed feeding on fish dropped by puffins. These fish, which include sand eels and rocklings, were dropped by puffins being harassed by gulls. A few species also are reported as consuming berries and seeds.

== Species list ==
The genus contains 46 species:

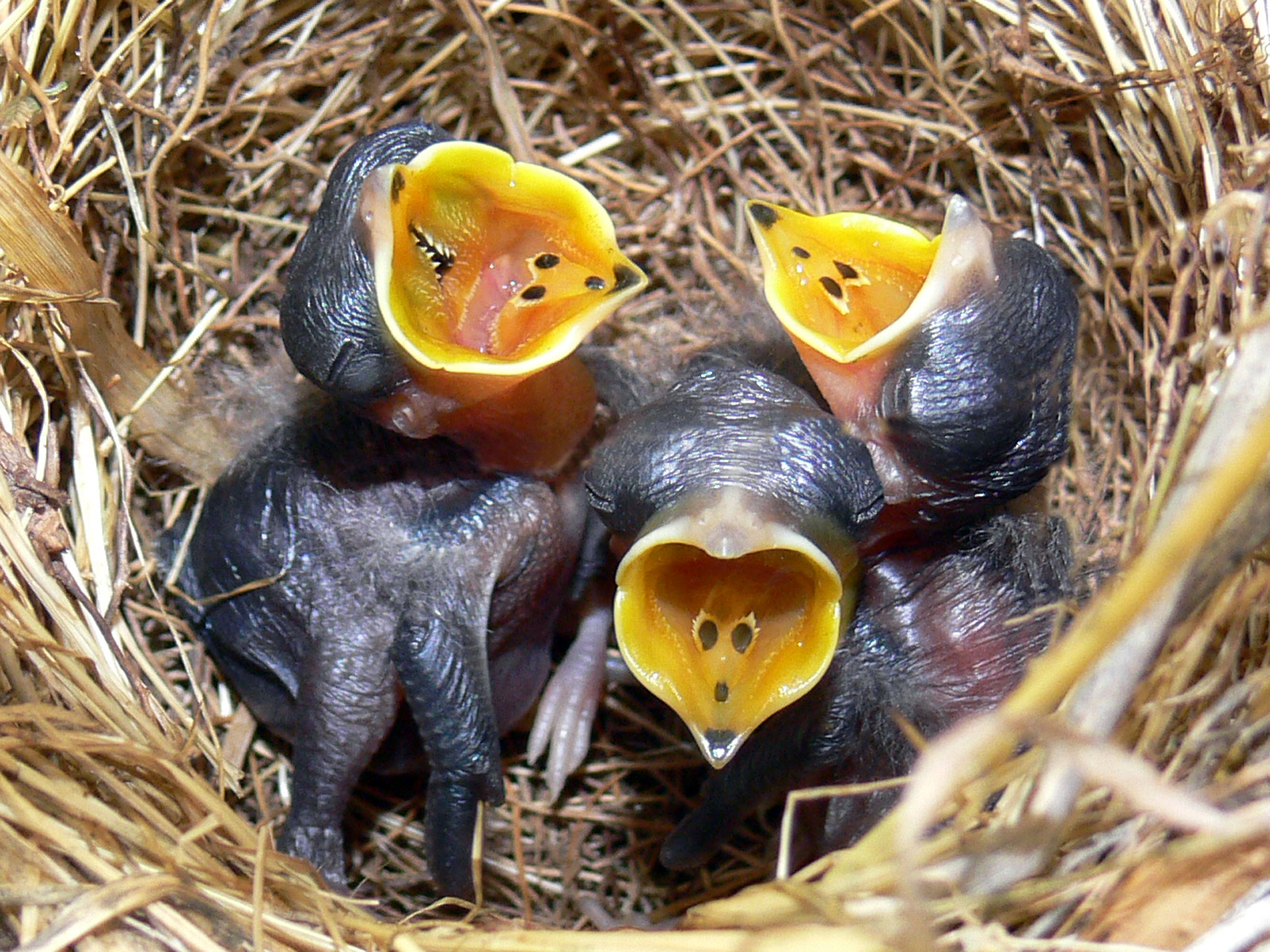
Australian pipit chicks in the nest

Image	Common name	Scientific name
	Upland pipit	Anthus sylvanus
	Blyth's pipit	Anthus godlewskii
	Mountain pipit	Anthus hoeschi
	Tawny pipit	Anthus campestris
	Berthelot's pipit	Anthus berthelotii
	Long-billed pipit	Anthus similis
	Buffy pipit	Anthus vaalensis
	Wood pipit	Anthus nyassae
	Nicholson's pipit	Anthus nicholsoni
	New Zealand pipit	Anthus novaeseelandiae
	Australian pipit	Anthus australis
	Long-legged pipit	Anthus pallidiventris
	Malindi pipit	Anthus melindae
	Plain-backed pipit	Anthus leucophrys
	African pipit	Anthus cinnamomeus
	Richard's pipit	Anthus richardi
	Paddyfield pipit	Anthus rufulus
	Striped pipit	Anthus lineiventris
	African rock pipit	Anthus crenatus
	Sokoke pipit	Anthus sokokensis
	Short-tailed pipit	Anthus brachyurus
	Bushveld pipit	Anthus caffer
	Sprague's pipit	Anthus spragueii
	Yellowish pipit	Anthus chii
	Short-billed pipit	Anthus furcatus
	Puna pipit	Anthus brevirostris
	Peruvian pipit	Anthus peruvianus
	Pampas pipit	Anthus chacoensis
	Hellmayr's pipit	Anthus hellmayri
	Paramo pipit	Anthus bogotensis
	Ochre-breasted pipit	Anthus nattereri
	South Georgia pipit	Anthus antarcticus
	Correndera pipit	Anthus correndera
	Pechora pipit	Anthus gustavi
	Madanga	Anthus ruficollis
	Alpine pipit	Anthus gutturalis
	Nilgiri pipit	Anthus nilghiriensis
	Tree pipit	Anthus trivialis
	Olive-backed pipit	Anthus hodgsoni
	Red-throated pipit	Anthus cervinus
	Rosy pipit	Anthus roseatus
	Siberian pipit	Anthus japonicus
	American pipit	Anthus rubescens
	Meadow pipit	Anthus pratensis
	European rock pipit	Anthus petrosus
	Water pipit	Anthus spinoletta
