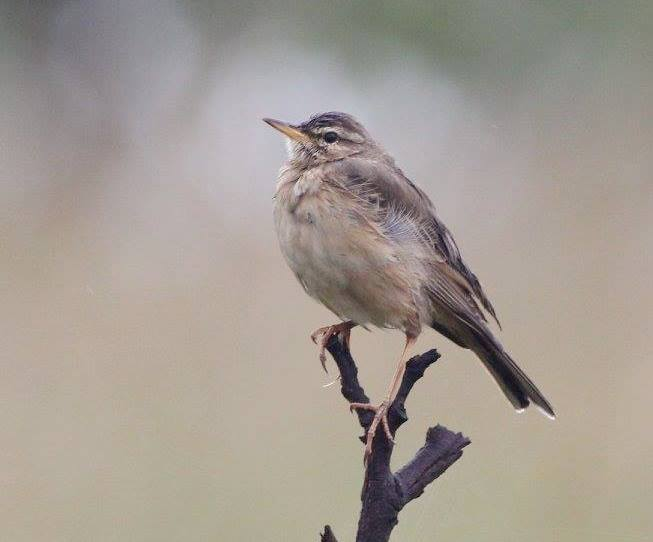

Conservation status
- Least Concern (IUCN 3.1)

Scientific classification
- Kingdom: Animalia
- Phylum: Chordata
- Class: Aves
- Order: Passeriformes
- Family: Motacillidae
- Genus: Anthus
- Species: A. nyassae

Binomial name
- Anthus nyassae Neumann, 1906

= Wood pipit =

Species of bird

The wood pipit or woodland pipit (Anthus nyassae) is a small passerine bird belonging to the pipit genus Anthus in the family Motacillidae. It was formerly included in the long-billed pipit (Anthus similis) but is now frequently treated as a separate species. It is a bird of miombo woodland in south-central Africa, unlike the long-billed pipit which inhabits open grassland. It perches in trees when flushed but forages on the ground for invertebrates.

== Description ==
It is 16-18 centimetres long. The upperparts are warm brown with dark streaks while the underparts are pale with some streaking on the breast. The bird has a dark eyestripe, white supercilium and pale outer tail-feathers. Juveniles have dark spots above and have more streaking below than the adults. The bird's song is high-pitched and monotonous.

The long-billed pipit is very similar but has a slightly longer bill and tail, a smaller pale area in the outer tail-feathers and a slightly lower voice.

== Range ==
The range of the wood pipit extends from south-east Gabon eastwards to southern and western Tanzania and southwards as far as north-east Namibia, northern Botswana, Zimbabwe and north-west Mozambique. At least three subspecies are recognized: A. n. nyassae, A. n. frondicolus and A. n. schoutedeni. Some authors recognize a fourth subspecies, A. n. chersophilus.
