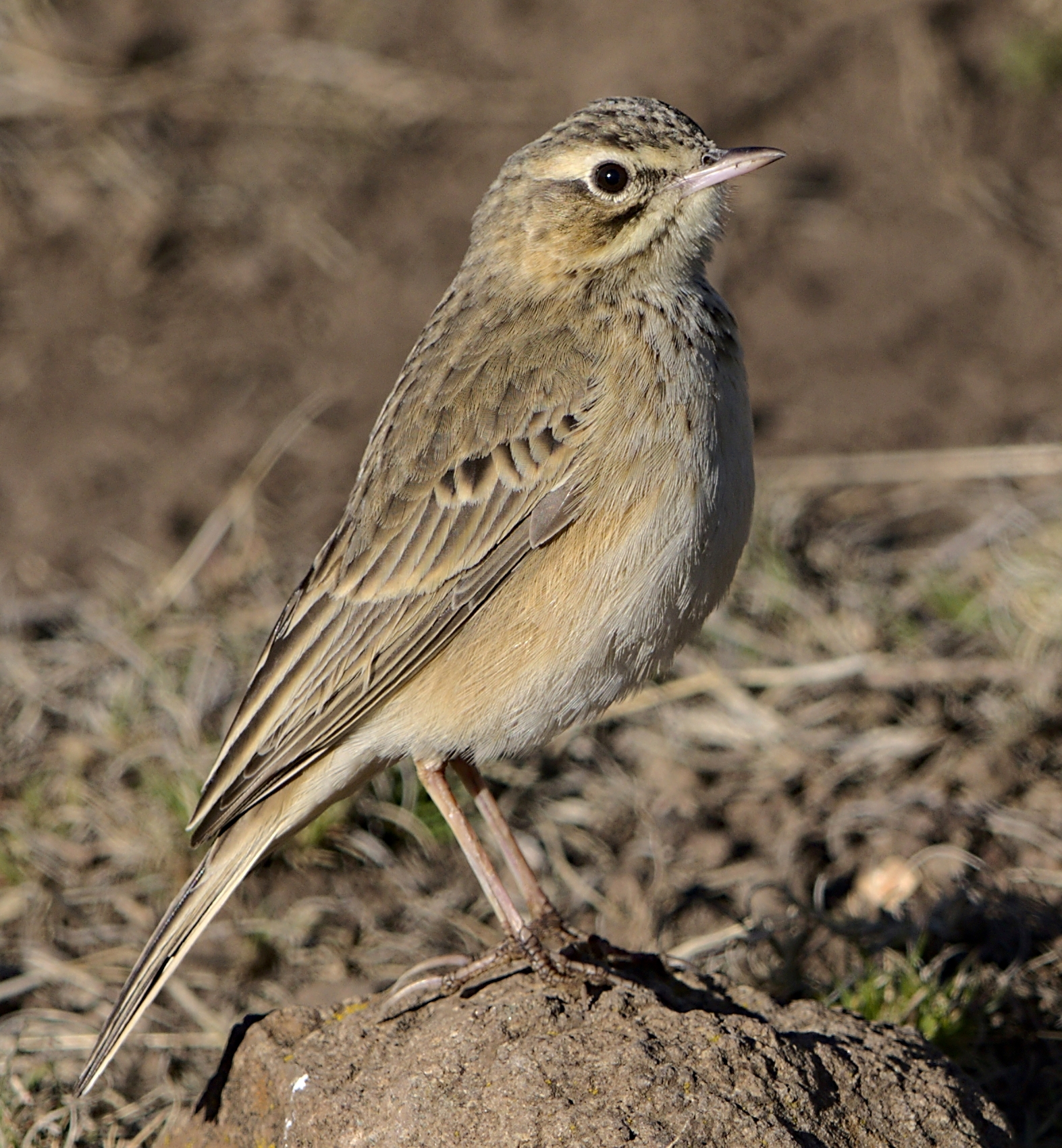
- At Naude's Neck Pass, South Africa

Conservation status
- Near Threatened (IUCN 3.1)

Scientific classification
- Kingdom: Animalia
- Phylum: Chordata
- Class: Aves
- Order: Passeriformes
- Family: Motacillidae
- Genus: Anthus
- Species: A. hoeschi

Binomial name
- Anthus hoeschi Stresemann, 1938
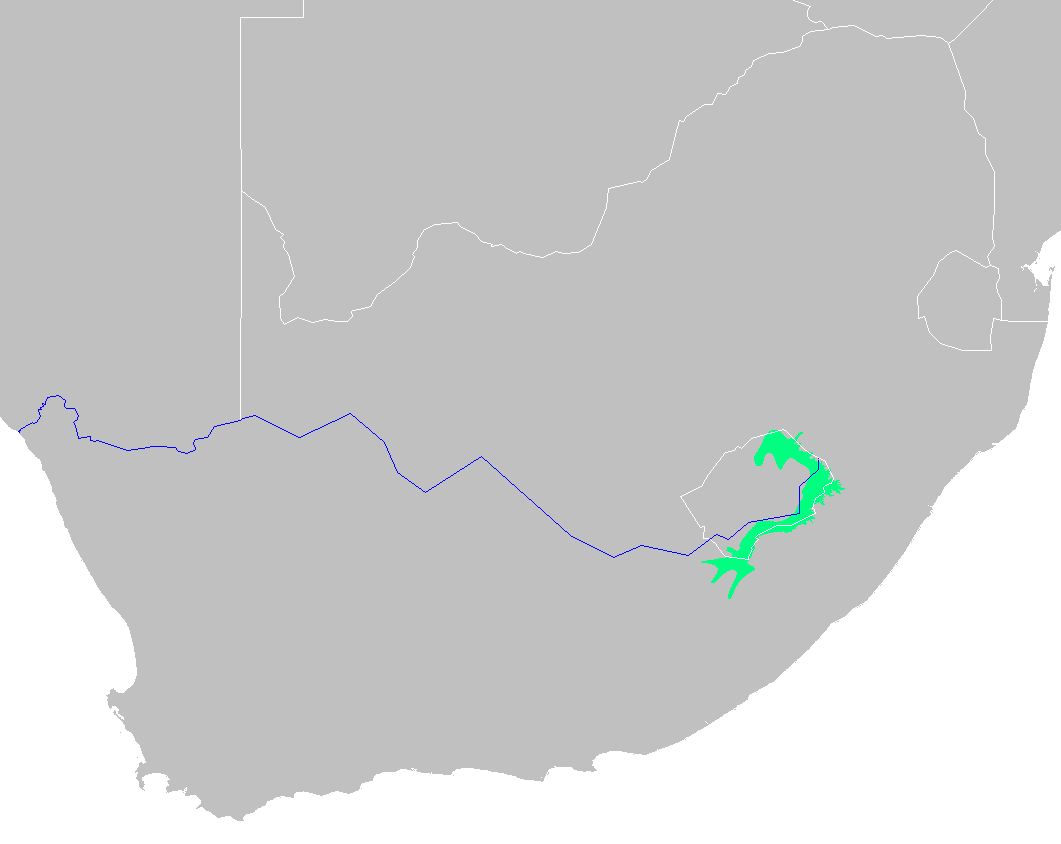
- Approximate summer range: the Drakensberg alti-montane grasslands

= Mountain pipit =

Species of bird

The mountain pipit (Anthus hoeschi) is a species of bird in the family Motacillidae.

Its breeding range is in Lesotho and adjacent South Africa. Its non-breeding range possibly includes Botswana, the DRC, Namibia and Zambia. Its natural overwintering habitat is subtropical or tropical grassland, and it breeds in temperate high altitude grassland in summer.
