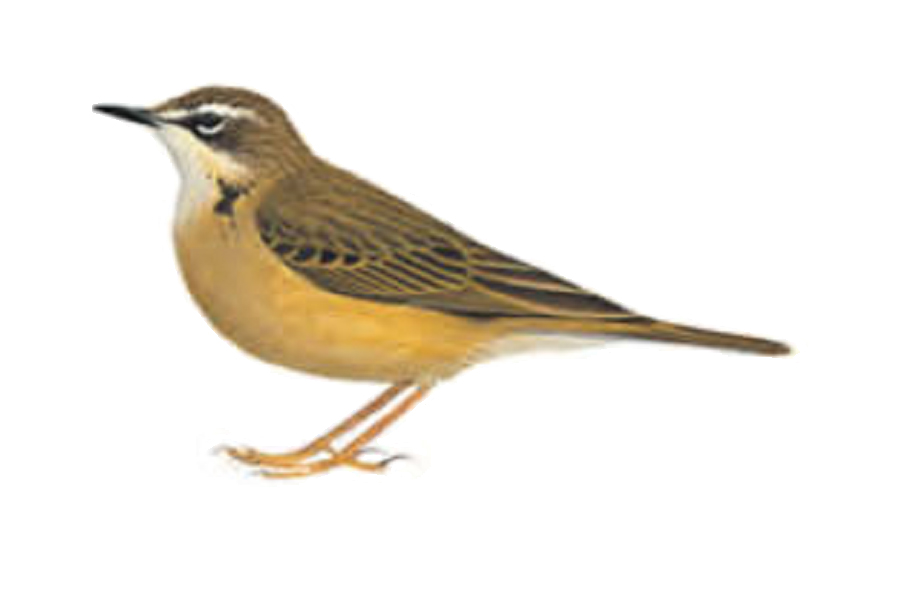

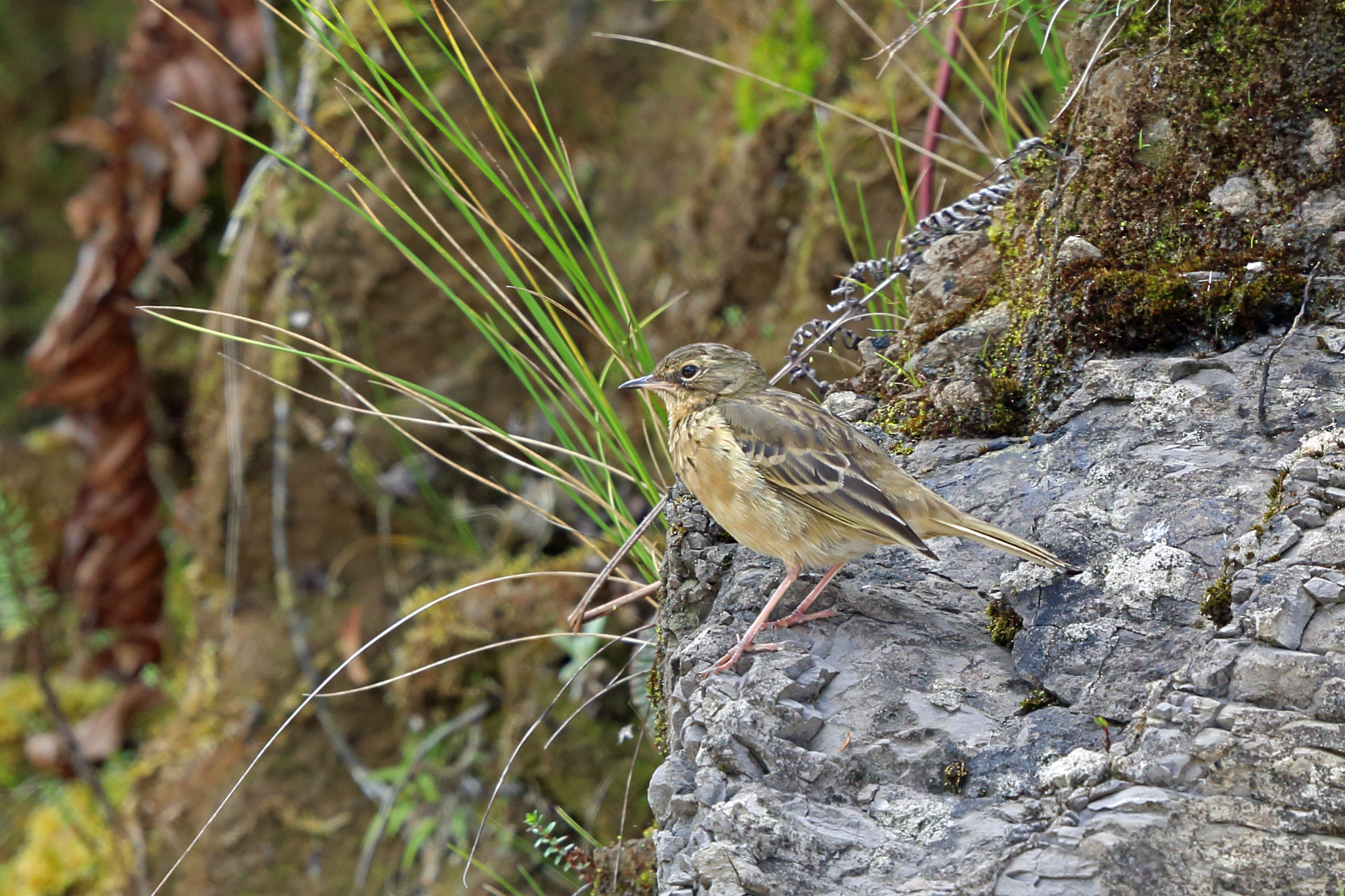

Conservation status
- Least Concern (IUCN 3.1)

Scientific classification
- Kingdom: Animalia
- Phylum: Chordata
- Class: Aves
- Order: Passeriformes
- Family: Motacillidae
- Genus: Anthus
- Species: A. gutturalis

Binomial name
- Anthus gutturalis De Vis, 1894

SubspeciesSubspecies
- Anthus gutturalis wollastoni; Anthus gutturalis rhodedendri; Anthus gutturalis gutturalis

= Alpine pipit =

Species of bird

The alpine pipit (Anthus gutturalis) is a species of bird in the family Motacillidae. It is found in New Guinea.

== Description ==
The alpine pipit is a medium-sized bird that lives in the alpine grasslands. It has a light brown back and wings with tan colored tips to its back feathers. Its chest is a strong tan color, matching the color of its similar tan tips of its back feathers and wings. The pipit has a skinny pointed beak. Directly under the tail, the bird has medium length red legs attached to long-toed pronged feet. The pipit also has three long tail feathers that extend about two inches off the back of its body.

== Bird sng ==
Alpine pipit sing when they are in flight right above the ground. The alpine pipit's song sounds like "tsee tsee'' repeatedly. It is a high-pitched quick noise. The pipit does this many times for a long period of time, making a high-pitched bird song.

Bird song recording: Click Here to Listen

== Diet and foraging ==
Alpine pipits eats insects and their larvae. Alpine pipit eat arthropods, grass seeds, berries and green herbaceous matter. Alpine pipit forage on the ground, waddling, and will also forage in groups. Alpine pipit fly up to rocks, bushes, or trees on the forest's edges when they are threatened. Alpine pipits will also hold their bill at a 45-degree angle towards the sky while scavenging.

== Habitat ==
The alpine pipit is native to Indonesia: Papua New Guinea. It lives in alpine grassland at the highest part of the mountain ranges in Papua New Guinea. These mountains are from 3200m to 4500m high, and sometimes the alpine pipit will go down to mountains 2500 m high. The alpine pipit is often found near shrubs and short grass. The system it lives in is terrestrial, and its habitat type is grassland.

== Conservation ==
The globally threat ranking is under the "Least Concern" category. The species is restricted to West Papua, but this does not seem to effect the population, as the population trend is stable.

== Breeding ==
Alpine pipit breed in the wet season during the months April, September, and October. Their single nestlings have been found during this time, and they are made up of fine grass and located on a steep bank. Alpine pipits do not migrate for breeding since they stay in the same locations all year round.
