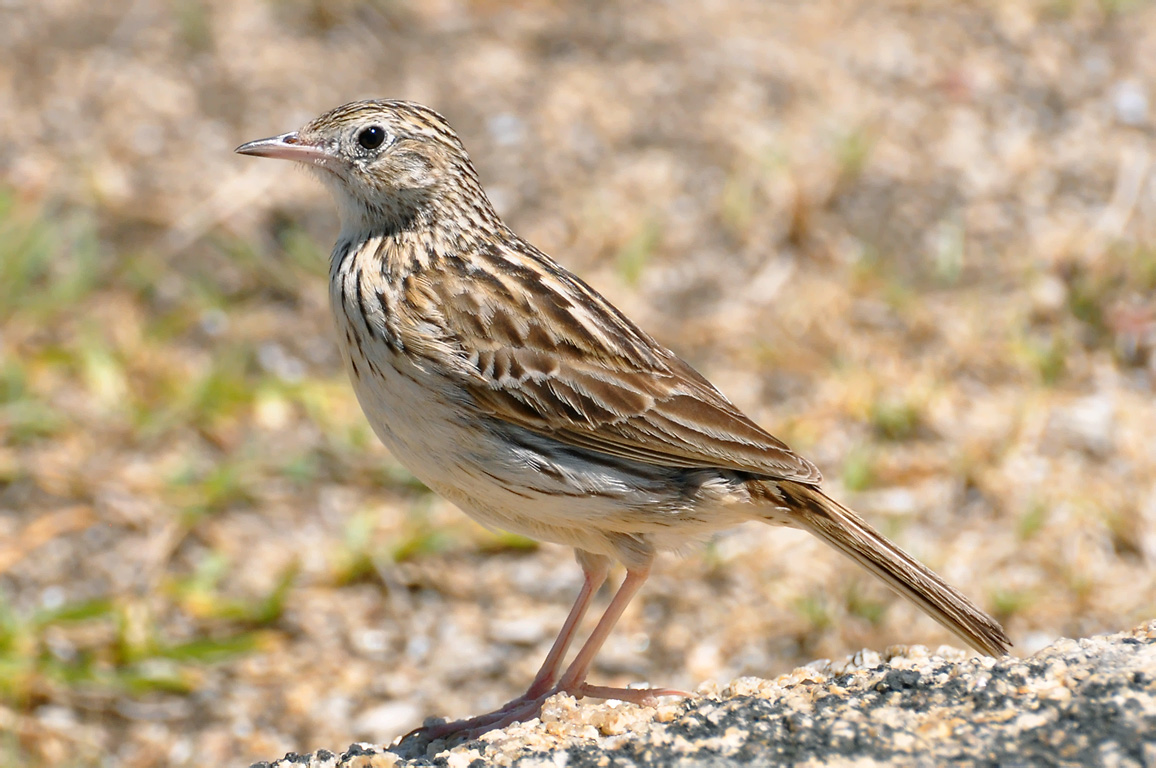
- Nominate A. c. correndera at Cabo Polonio, Rocha, Uruguay

Conservation status
- Least Concern (IUCN 3.1)

Scientific classification
- Kingdom: Animalia
- Phylum: Chordata
- Class: Aves
- Order: Passeriformes
- Family: Motacillidae
- Genus: Anthus
- Species: A. correndera

Binomial name
- Anthus correndera Vieillot, 1818

= Correndera pipit =

Species of bird

The correndera pipit (Anthus correndera) is a species of bird in the family Motacillidae, the wagtails and pipits. It is found in Argentina, Bolivia, Brazil, Chile, the Falkland Islands, Peru, Uruguay, and as a vagrant to Paraguay.

== Taxonomy and systematics ==
The correndera pipit was originally described by Louis Pierre Vieillot in 1818 with its current binomial Anthus correndera.

The correndera pipit has these five subspecies:

- A. c. calcaratus Taczanowski, 1875
- A. c. correndera Vieillot, 1818
- A. c. catamarcae Hellmayr, 1921
- A. c. chilensis (Lesson, RP, 1839)
- A. c. grayi Bonaparte, 1850

Some authors have suggested that the nominate subspecies A. c. correndera and subspecies A. c. catamarcae could form a separate species or two separate species. Others have proposed that the South Georgia pipit (A. antarcticus) be treated as a sixth subspecies.

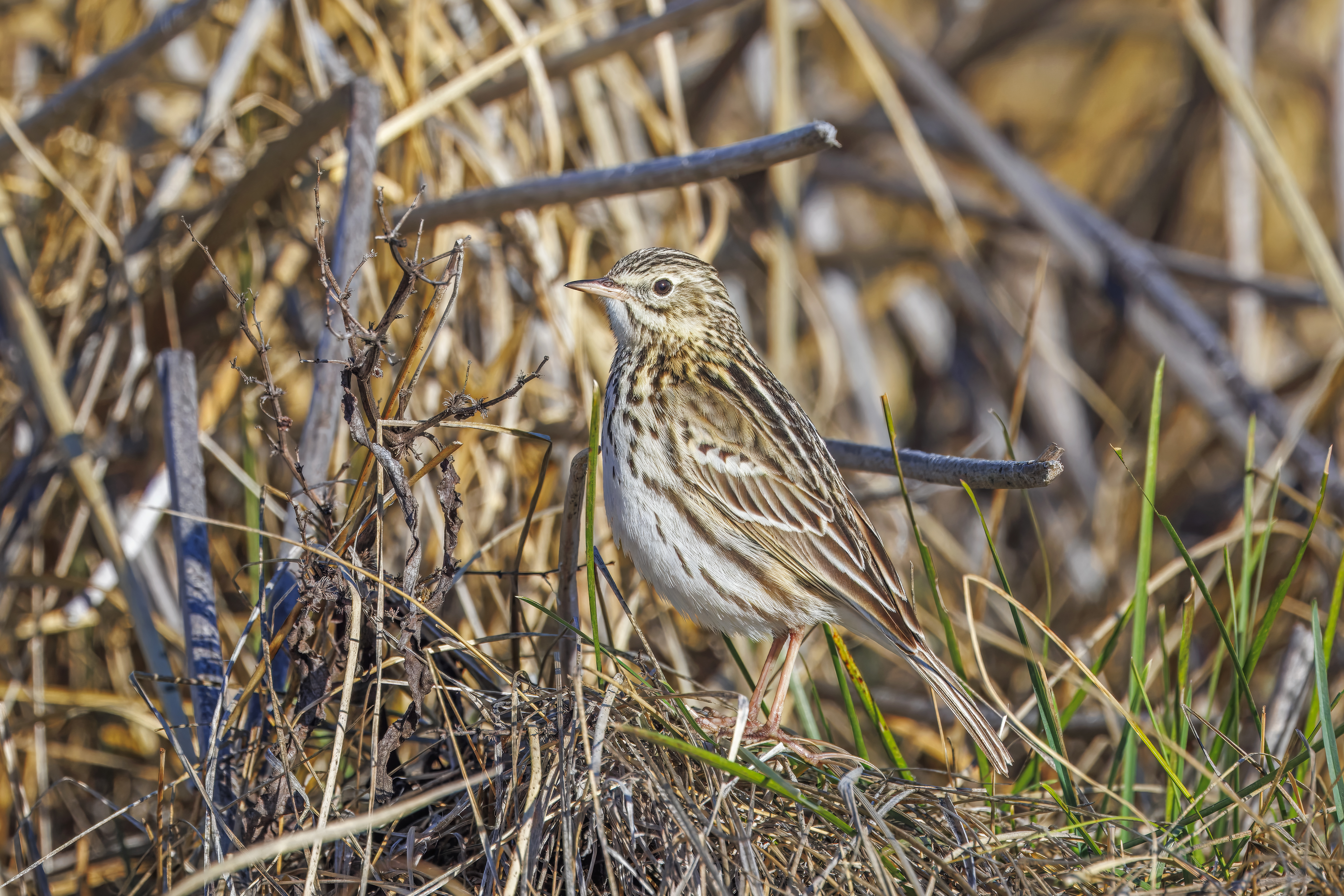
A. c. chilensis, El Calafate, Argentina

== Description ==
The correndera pipit is 14 to 16 cm (5.5 to 6.3 in) long and weighs about 15 to 26 g (0.53 to 0.92 oz). The sexes have the same plumage. Adults of the nominate subspecies have a dusky head with a whitish supercilium, a whitish eye-ring, a thin blackish "moustache", and a blackish streak on the cheek. Their upperparts are dusky with heavy cinnamon-buff streaks and a white streak on each shoulder. Their wings are dusky with white edges on the primaries and buffy white edges on the coverts; the latter show as two wing bars. Their tail is mostly dusky with much white to whitish on the outer two pairs of feathers. Their throat and underparts are buffy white to whitish with large dark spots across the breast and black streaks on the flanks. All subspecies have a dark iris, a dark maxilla, a dark mandible with a paler base, and brown to pinkish brown legs and feet.

The other subspecies of the correndera pipit differ from the nominate and each other thus:

- A. c. calcaratus: much darker than nominate, with cinnamon tinge on the upperparts, a rufous rump, and buff underparts
- A. c. chilensis: darker and more buffy upperparts than nominate, with pale buff streaks on the mantle, a rufous tinge on the rump, white only on the outermost pair of tail feathers, and thinner streaks on the breast that extend onto the upper belly
- A. c. catamarcae: darker upperparts and deeper rufous on the rump than chilensis
- A. c. grayi: largest subspecies; smaller spots and streaks on the underparts than nominate

== Distribution and habitat ==
The subspecies of the correndera pipit are found thus:

- A. c. calcaratus: central Peru from southeastern Ancash and western Huánuco south to western Junín; southern Peru in southeastern Cuzco and central Puno
- A. c. correndera: Santa Catarina and Rio Grande do Sul in far southern Brazil, southern Paraguay, Uruguay, and northern Argentina (but see below)
- A. c. catamarcae: northern Chile's Antofagasta Region, southwestern Bolivia, and northwestern Argentina's Catamarca Province
- A. c. chilensis: from Chile's Atacama Region east across Argentina and south in both countries to Tierra del Fuego
- A. c. grayi: the Falkland Islands

The South American Classification Committee lists the correndera pipit as a non-resident vagrant in Paraguay.

The subspecies of the correndera pipit inhabit different landscapes. The nominate and A. c. calcaratus primarily are found in somewhat arid puna grassland and also in pastures, agricultural lands, bogs, and wet lakeshores. The nominate is often seen along grassy roadsides. In elevation they mostly range from 2,500 to 4,450 m (8,200 to 14,600 ft) but in Peru A. c. calcaratus reaches 4,600 m (15,100 ft). Subspecies A. c. catamarcae and A. c. chilensis inhabit the Patagonian steppe, grasslands, and the edges of wetlands from sea level to about 1,250 m (4,100 ft). A. c. grayi favors large tracts of coarse white grass in wet areas.

== Behavior ==
=== Movement ===
The correndera pipit is a partial migrant, though most populations are year-round residents. Members of the southernmost population of subspecies A. c. chilensis move north for the austral winter. In addition, some individuals in the northeastern population move north beyond the year-round range for that season.

=== Feeding ===
The correndera pipit's diet has not been detailed but is known to include larval and adult insects and other invertebrates; it probably includes seeds as well. It forages while walking and running on the ground.

=== Breeding ===
The correndera pipit's breeding season in most of mainland South America spans from June to December. It possibly breeds year-round in Peru. On the Falklands it breeds between September and December. Males make a flight display that rises as high as 40 m (130 ft) where it hovers; it glides down and often reascends several times. The species' nest is a cup made from grass lined with finer plant fibers and hair, and is usually hidden in a depression in the ground. The clutch is two to four eggs. The incubation period, time to fledging, and details of parental care are not known.

=== Vocalization ===
The correndera pipit sings during the flight display. One description of its song is a "cheerful, unstructured series of twittering, like fitfit-wrrrruh, fit-frit-oh-frút, and fit-frit-oh-wrrrruh"; the wrrrruh is a "toneless, nasal trill". Another description is "a variable, rich series of gurgling, warbling, and trilling phrases". Its call is "a rising, buzzy tjzee?".

== Status ==
The IUCN has assessed the correndera pipit as being of Least Concern. It has a very large range; its population size is not known but is believed to be stable. No immediate threats have been identified. It is considered common to fairly common and widespread overall; it is common in the Falklands. It is "fairly common but apparently local" in Peru and "common to frequent" in Brazil.
