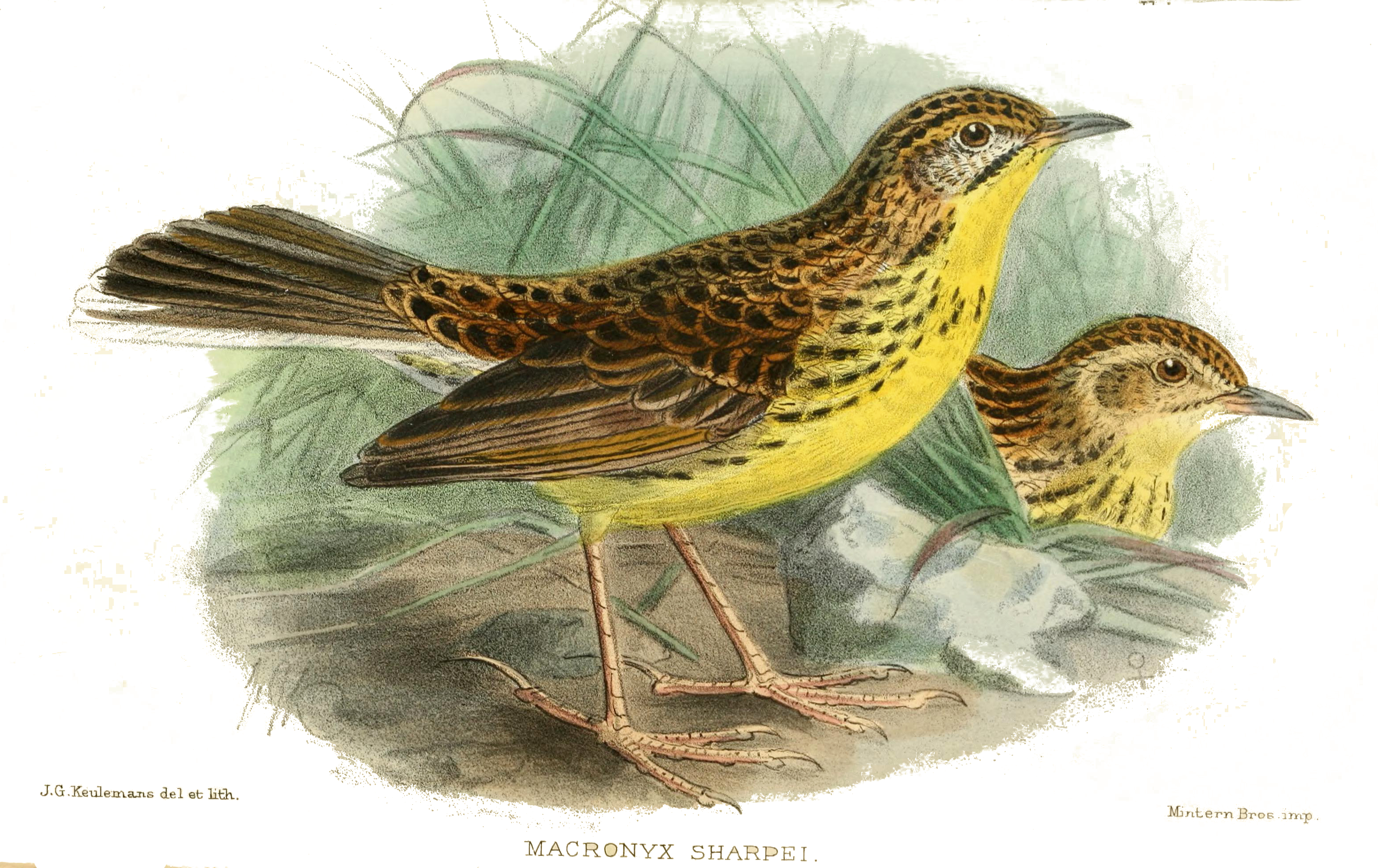

Conservation status
- Endangered (IUCN 3.1)

Scientific classification
- Kingdom: Animalia
- Phylum: Chordata
- Class: Aves
- Order: Passeriformes
- Family: Motacillidae
- Genus: Macronyx
- Species: M. sharpei

Binomial name
- Macronyx sharpei Jackson, 1904

= Sharpe's longclaw =

Species of bird

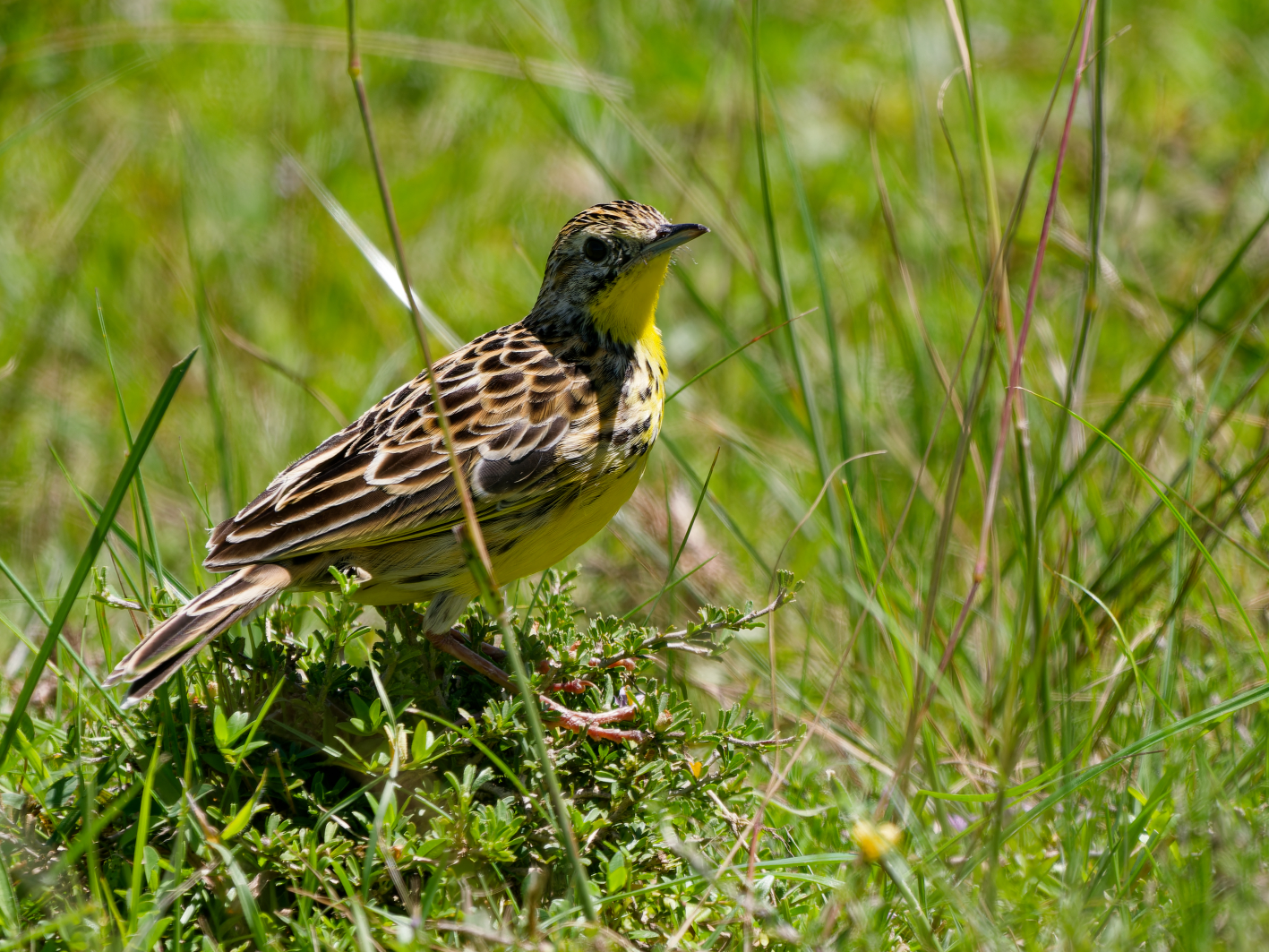
Sharpe's Longclaw

Sharpe's longclaw (Macronyx sharpei) is a passerine bird in the longclaw family Motacillidae, which also includes the pipits and wagtails. It is endemic to Kenya.

It is 16–17 cm long, with upperparts heavily marked with buff and rufous streaks, yellow underparts, and white outer tail feathers in flight.

This bird is endangered, with an estimated population of less than 20,000. Its grassland habitat is being replaced by cultivation and woodlots.

The common name and Latin binomial name commemorate the British zoologist Richard Bowdler Sharpe.

== Taxonomy ==
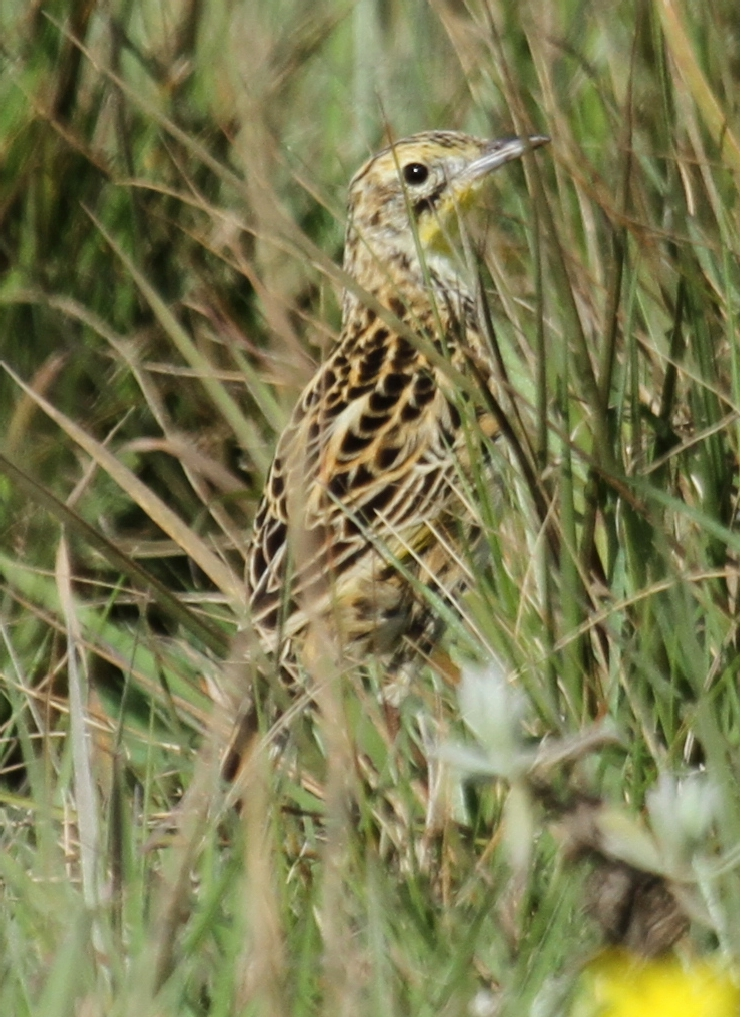
Kinangop Plateau - Kenya

Sharpe's longclaw was described by the English ornithologist Frederick John Jackson in 1904 from specimens collected in the Mau Plateau area of Kenya. He coined the binomial name Macronyx sharpei. Both the common name and the specific epithet honour the English ornithologist and museum curator Richard Bowdler Sharpe.

The Sharpe's longclaw is a member of the family Motacillidae, which includes the pipits and wagtails. Some ornithologists place the species with the yellow-breasted pipit in the separate genus Hemimacronyx. The two species are closely related and form a superspecies. This genus, along with the golden pipit in the genus Tmetothylacus and the longclaws form an exclusively African clade within the family, separate from the true pipits in the genus Anthus and the wagtails.

== Distribution and habitat ==
The Sharpe's longclaw is found in the highlands of west and central Kenya. It has a restricted distribution, occurring on the northern slopes of Mount Kenya, the southern slopes of the Aberdares, on the Gishu, Mau and Kinangop Plateaus around the Rift Valley, and the Kenyan slopes of Mount Elgon (possibly the Ugandan slopes as well).

The natural habitat of the species is open treeless grassland with short and often tussocky grasses. It ranges between 1,850 and 3,400 m (6,070–11,150 ft) in altitude, although more commonly below 2,800 m (9,200 ft). It occurs at higher altitudes than the yellow-throated longclaw, with little overlap between the ranges of the two species. It is generally non-migratory, but will travel short distances when its habitat becomes too dry.

== Behaviour ==
=== Diet and feeding ===
The Sharpe's longclaw feeds on insects, particularly grasshoppers and beetles. Other invertebrates are taken as well. Within its range it has a higher feeding rate in grasslands with tussocks. The species forages alone or in pairs, sometimes in small family groups.

=== Breeding ===
The Sharpe's longclaw is a monogamous and solitary breeder that defends a territory. The breeding season is during or after the rains, from March to June, September to October and in December. The species has a brief aerial breeding display, where the bird flies up and then drops, singing rapidly as it drops. The nest is a well-made cup of dried grass lined with roots and placed near the ground at the base of a grass tussock or under a shrub or plant. Between two and three eggs are laid.
