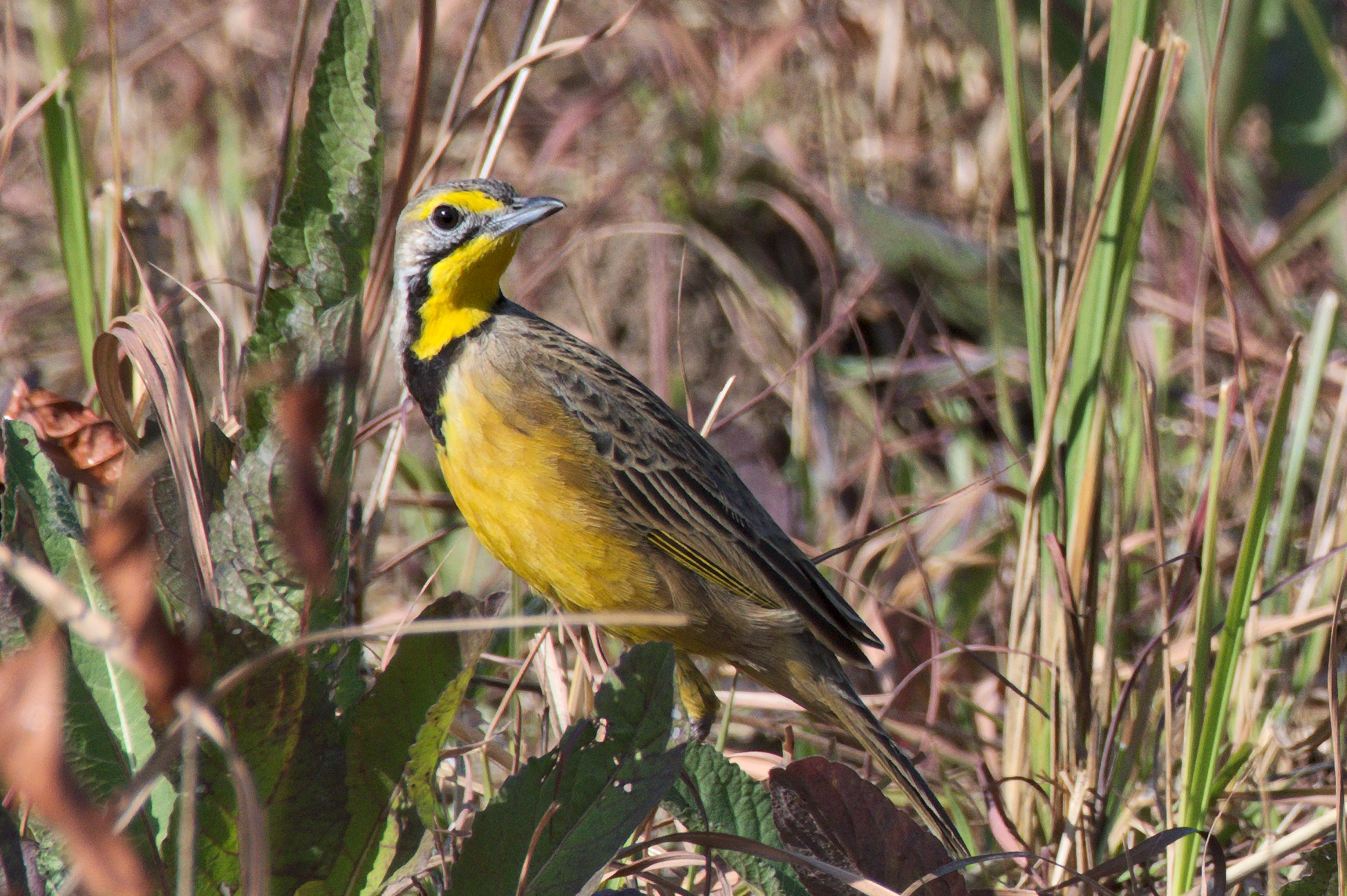

Conservation status
- Least Concern (IUCN 3.1)

Scientific classification
- Kingdom: Animalia
- Phylum: Chordata
- Class: Aves
- Order: Passeriformes
- Family: Motacillidae
- Genus: Macronyx
- Species: M. fuelleborni

Binomial name
- Macronyx fuelleborni Reichenow, 1900

Synonyms
- Macronyx fuellebornii

= Fülleborn's longclaw =

Species of bird

Fülleborn's longclaw (Macronyx fuelleborni) or Fuelleborn's longclaw, is a species of bird in the family Motacillidae. It is found in damp grassy habitats in south-central Africa.

== Taxonomy ==
Two subspecies of Fülleborn's longclaw are recognised:

- Macronyx fuellebornii ascensi Salvadori, 1907: which is found in Angola, the central and southern parts of the Democratic Republic of Congo, in Zambia west of the valley of the Luangwa River and, rarely, in extreme northern Namibia.
- M. f. fuelleborni Reichenow, 1900 :restricted to south-western Tanzania.

== Description ==
Fülleborn's longclaw is similar to the yellow-throated longclaw but it is slightly smaller, stockier and lacks the streaking on the breast. It has a yellow throat surrounded by a black band when adult and the yellow on the throat is duller in juveniles which also do not have the surrounding black band and have some indistinct streaks on the breast, but this is much less in extend than in related species.

== Distribution ==
Fülleborn's longclaw is found in western central Africa from south western Tanzania to Angola and the extreme north of Namibia, where it is a vagrant.

== Habitat and ecology ==
Fülleborn's longclaw is found in wet gassy areas, frequently in the vicinity of water and normally above 1,000 metres (3,300 ft) in altitude. It is largely insectivorous and feeds on mainly on grasshoppers and beetles as well as termites and spiders. It nests on the ground during the rainy season.

== Conservation ==
Fülleborn's longclaw has a wide distribution and large population so Birdlife International and the IUCN classify it as Least Concern.

== Etymology ==
The specific name and the common name of this bird commemorate the German military physician and parasitologist Friedrich Fülleborn (1866-1933).
