= Sharpei =

Sharpei could refer to:

- Shar Pei, the dog breed
- Iberian green woodpecker (Picus sharpei)
- Sharpe's longclaw (Hemimacronyx sharpei)
