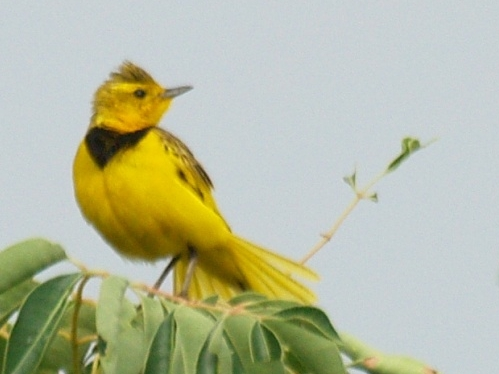
- In Pongolo Nature Reserve

Conservation status
- Least Concern (IUCN 3.1)

Scientific classification
- Kingdom: Animalia
- Phylum: Chordata
- Class: Aves
- Order: Passeriformes
- Family: Motacillidae
- Genus: Tmetothylacus; Cabanis, 1879
- Species: T. tenellus

Binomial name
- Tmetothylacus tenellus (Cabanis, 1878)

= Golden pipit =

Species of bird

The golden pipit (Tmetothylacus tenellus) is a distinctive pipit of dry country grassland, savanna and shrubland in eastern Africa. It is native to Ethiopia, Kenya, Somalia, South Sudan, Tanzania and Uganda, and has occurred as a vagrant to Oman, South Africa and Zimbabwe.

The adult male, unlike most pipits, is very easy to identify. It is yellow below and yellow in the wings. From the front the yellow throat and breast with the dark band does resemble the yellow-throated longclaw or Pangani longclaw, but neither have yellow wings (very obvious in flight) and both have a black line in the face. The female golden pipit is a fairly typical brown pipit but has a yellow underside to the wing. It is gold in colour.
