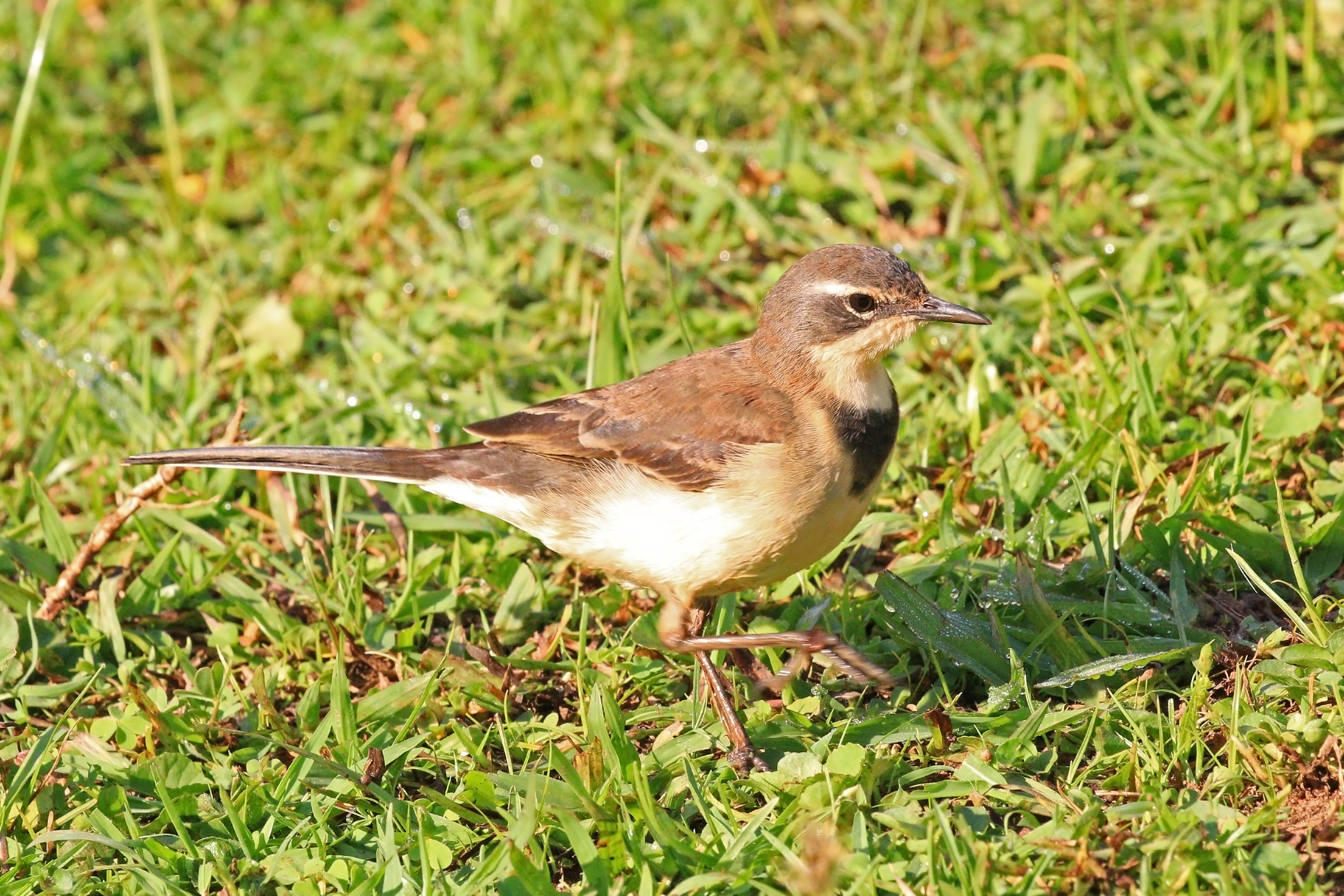
- M. c. wellsi at Lake Bunyonyi, Uganda

Conservation status
- Least Concern (IUCN 3.1)

Scientific classification
- Kingdom: Animalia
- Phylum: Chordata
- Class: Aves
- Order: Passeriformes
- Family: Motacillidae
- Genus: Motacilla
- Species: M. capensis

Binomial name
- Motacilla capensis Linnaeus, 1766
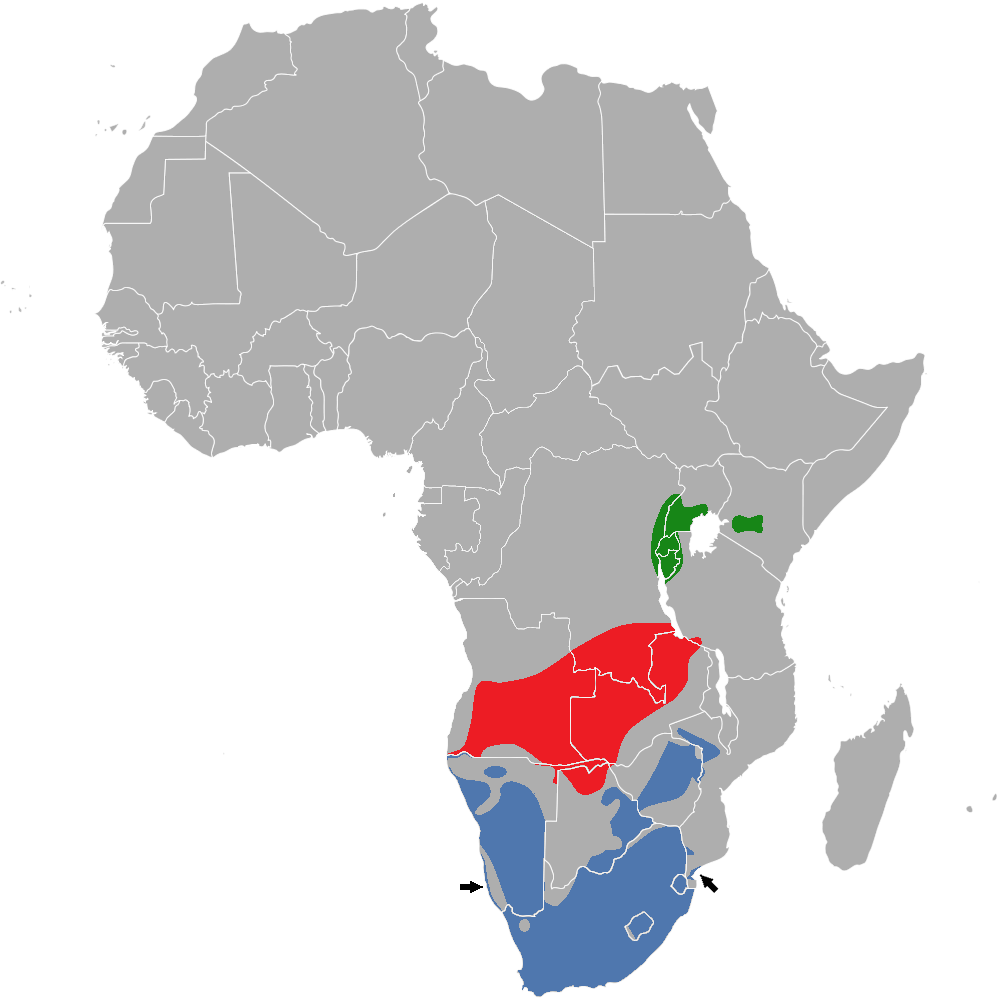
- Range, showing subspecies: M. capensis wellsi M. capensis simplicissima M. capensis capensis

= Cape wagtail =

Species of bird

The Cape wagtail (Motacilla capensis), also known as Wells's wagtail, is a small insectivorous bird which is widespread in southern Africa. It frequents water's edge, lawns and gardens. It is a mostly resident, territorial species, but has been known to undertake limited altitudinal migration or form flocks outside of the breeding season. Like other wagtails they are passerine birds of the family Motacillidae, which also includes the pipits and longclaws.

== Taxonomy ==
In 1760, French zoologist Mathurin Jacques Brisson included a description of the Cape wagtail in his Ornithologie based on a specimen collected from the Cape of Good Hope. He used the French name La bergeronette du Cap de Bonne Espérance and the Latin Motacilla Capitis Bonae Spei. Although Brisson coined Latin names, these do not conform to the binomial system and are not recognised by the International Commission on Zoological Nomenclature. When in 1766 the Swedish naturalist Carl Linnaeus updated his Systema Naturae for the twelfth edition, he added 240 species that had been previously described by Brisson. One of these was the Cape wagtail. Linnaeus included a brief description, coined the binomial name Motacilla capensis and cited Brisson's work. The genus Motacilla had been introduced in 1758 by Linnaeus in the tenth edition of his Systema Naturae. The specific name capensis denotes the Cape of Good Hope.

Three subspecies, occurring in three distinct regions are currently recognised:

- M. c. simplicissima Neumann, 1929 — Angola to southeastern DRC, Zambia, the Caprivi Strip, northern Botswana and western Zimbabwe;
- M. c. capensis Linnaeus, 1766 — common Cape wagtail; Namibia, South Africa, Lesotho, Eswatini, Zimbabwe and central Mozambique;
- M. c. wellsi Ogilvie-Grant, 1911 — Highlands of the eastern DRC to Uganda and Kenya.

== Description ==
The Cape wagtail has a dull plumage and a relatively short tail, with olive grey breast and face, with a tan supercilium and dark lores. The underparts are creamy white and may show a faint pinkish wash on the lower breast and belly. The breast band is dusky and the sides of the breast and the flanks are olive-grey. The brownish black wings have pale edges to the feathers and the tail is blackish with the two outer tail feathers being white. The juveniles are similar to the adults but browner above and yellower below. There is no colour or plumage distinction between males and females. The Wagtail also has an iconic black triangle on its chest.

== Distribution and habitat ==
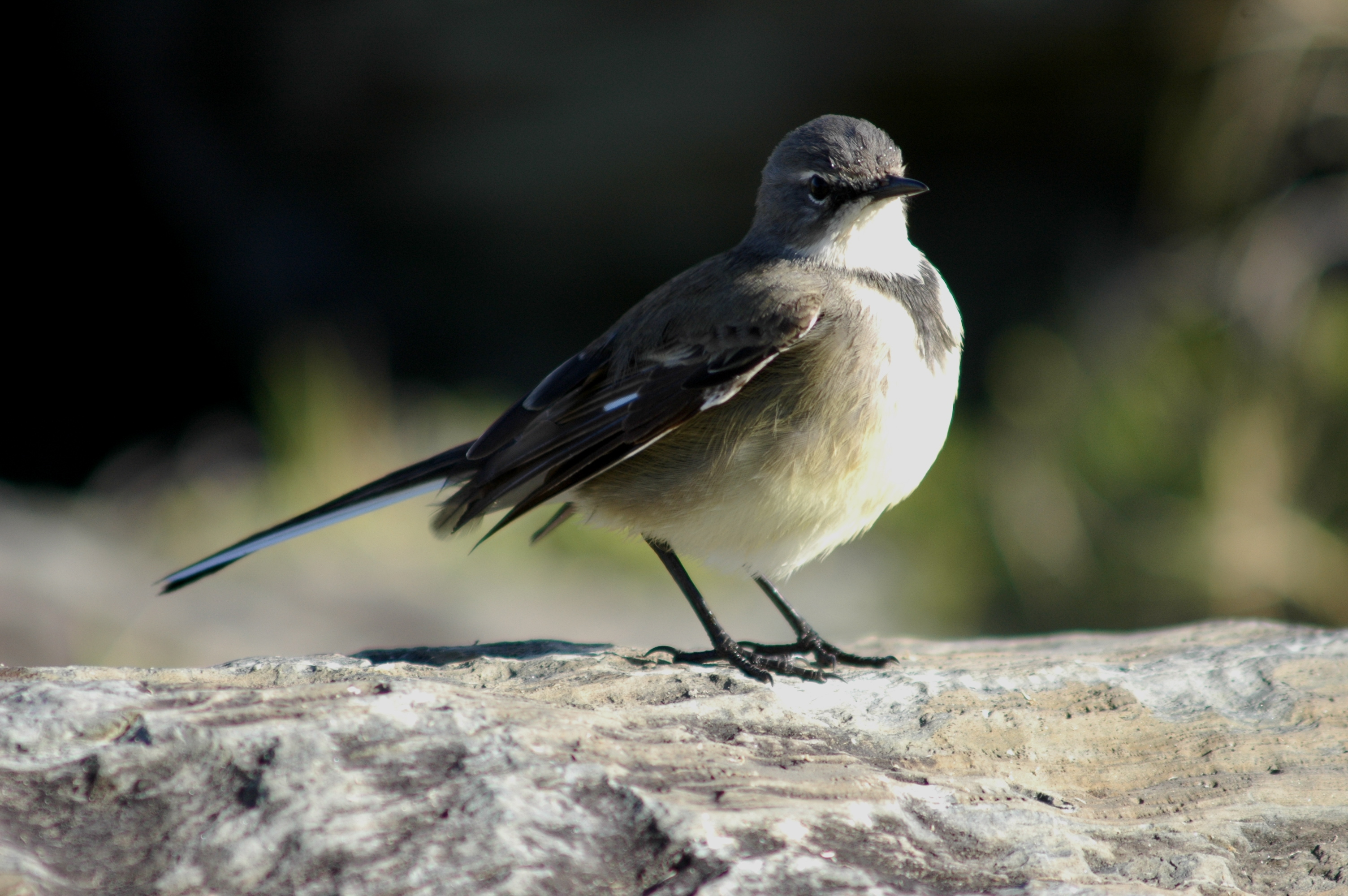
M. c. capensis on the South African south coast

Cape wagtails are found in eastern and southern Africa from Uganda, the eastern DRCongo and Kenya, through Zambia and Angola to southern Africa, south to the Western Cape and the Cape of Good Hope.

Cape wagtails can be found in almost any habitat that has open ground adjacent to water, and also along the rocky coastline, in farms, villages, cultivated land, parks, gardens and urban centres. In east Africa it is generally found above 2,000 m (6,600 ft) in altitude.

== Behaviour ==
The Cape wagtail's main food is invertebrates. Foraging occurs mainly on the ground or in shallow water, and they will consume carrion. It has been observed feeding on insects attracted by lights or caught in car radiators. It has also been recorded as eating fiddler crabs, sandhoppers, snails, ticks, tadpoles, small fish, small chameleons and human food.

The Cape wagtail is a monogamous, territorial solitary nester, and breeding pairs stay together over a number of breeding seasons. Like many territorial birds, the males will fiercely attack their own reflection when seen in mirrors or windows. The nest is built by both sexes and consists of a cup made of a wide range of materials, both natural and artificial, which is lined with hair, rootlets, wool and feathers. The nest is situated in a recess within a steep bank, tree, or bush, or in a man-made location such as a hole in a wall, a pot plant, or a bridge. It breeds all year round but, egg-laying peaks from July until December (mid-winter to early summer). Between one and five eggs are laid, which both parents take turns incubating for 13–15 days. Once hatched, the chicks are fed by both parents, until they leave the nest after 14–18 days. Once fledged, the adults continue to feed them for another 20–25 days, and the young become fully independent around 44 days - 60 days after fledging.

It has been recorded as host of the following brood parasites: Diderick cuckoo (Chrysococcyx caprius), Jacobin cuckoo (Clamator jacobinus), and Levaillant's cuckoo (Clamator levaillantii). Predators include the rufous-breasted sparrowhawk (Accipter rufiventris), as well as cats and rats (Rattus spp).

== Gallery ==
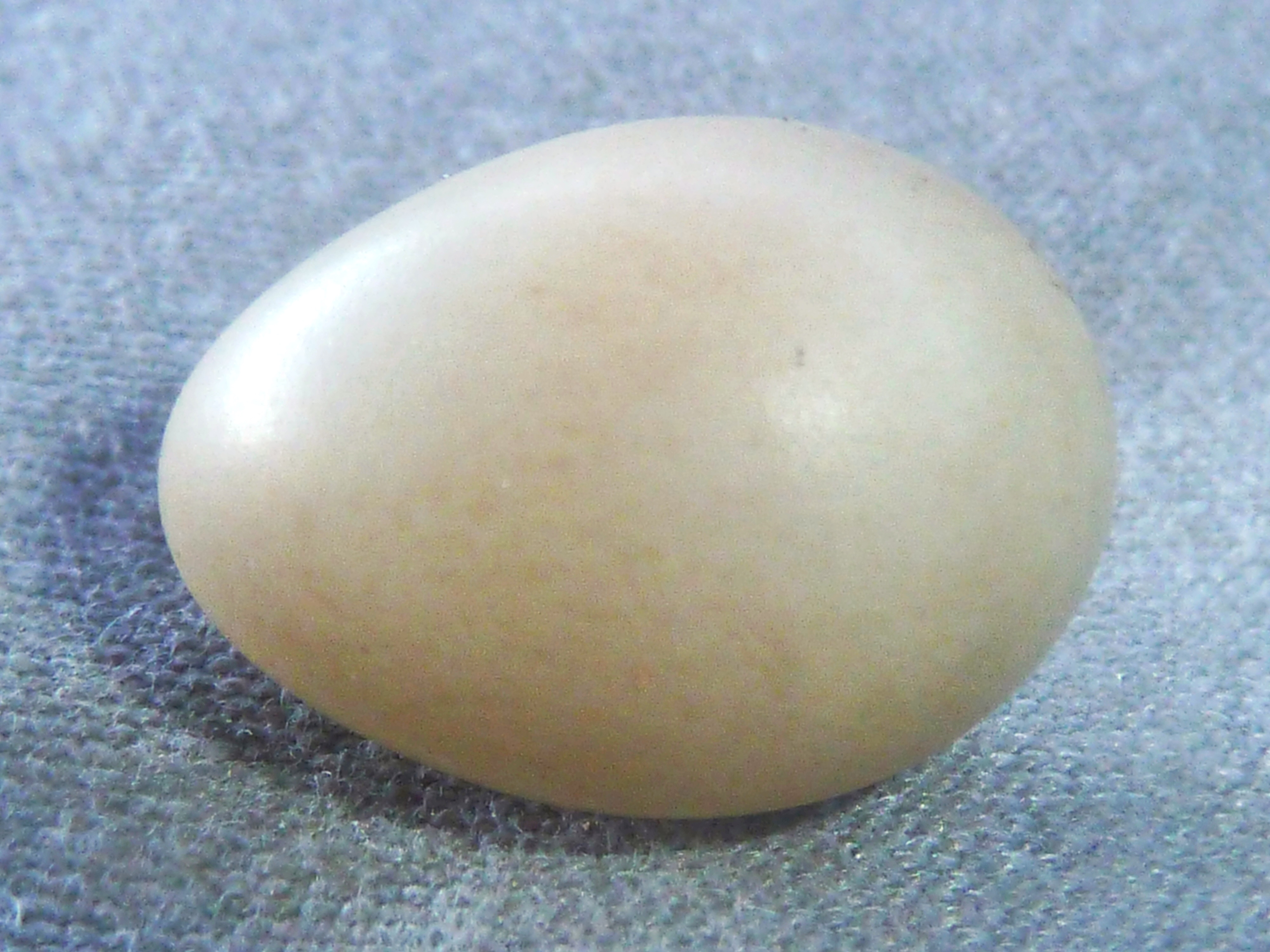
Off-white egg of the nominate subspecies – the base colour and markings are very variable

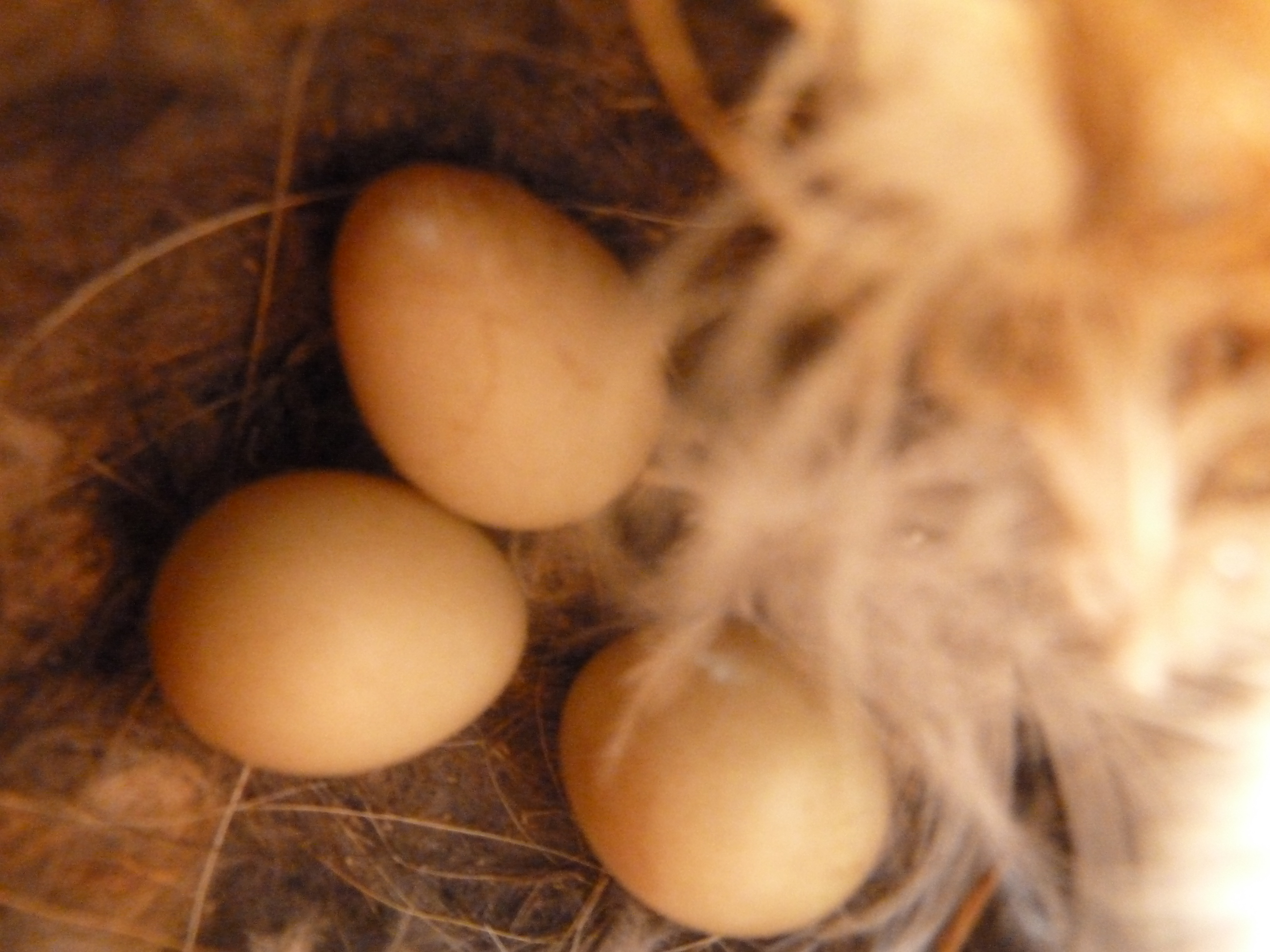
A clutch of three eggs in a nest, three being the average number

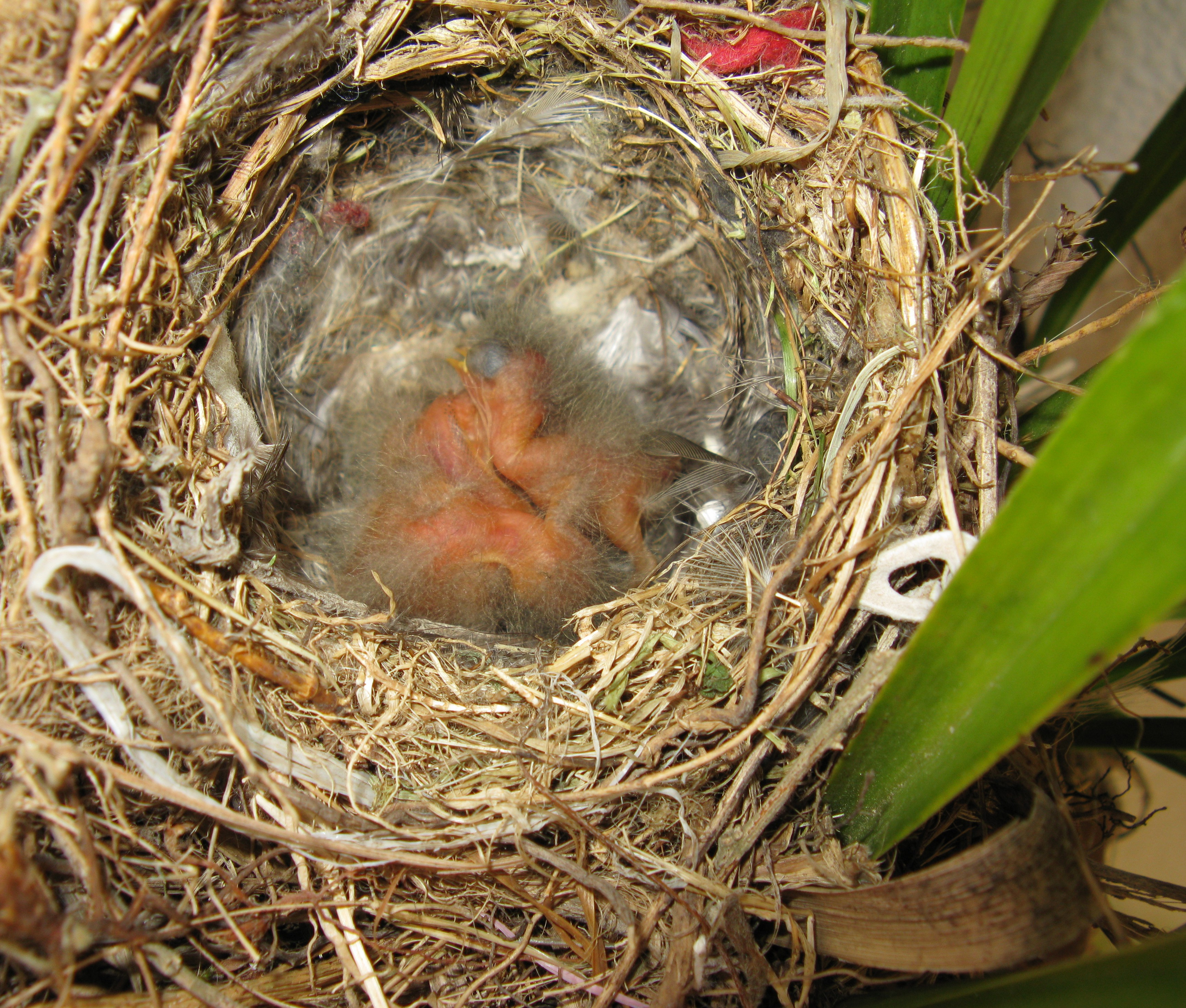
Three 2 days old chicks – the chicks may hatch on the same or on successive days

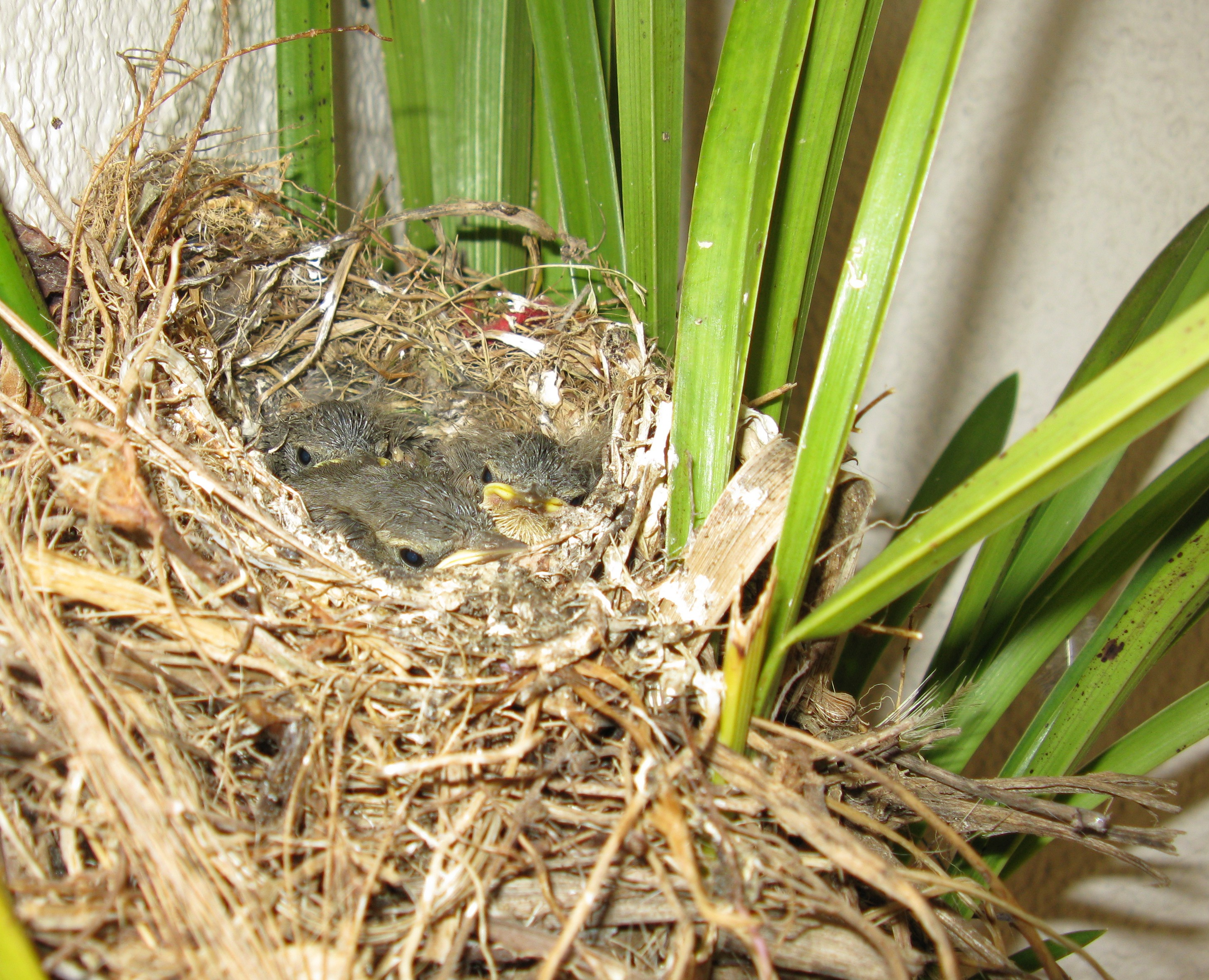
Three 13 days old chicks – the average nestling period is 16 days
