= Rock pipit =

Rock pipit may refer to either of two species:

- European rock pipit, Anthus petrosus
- African rock pipit (or yellow-tufted pipit), Anthus crenatus
