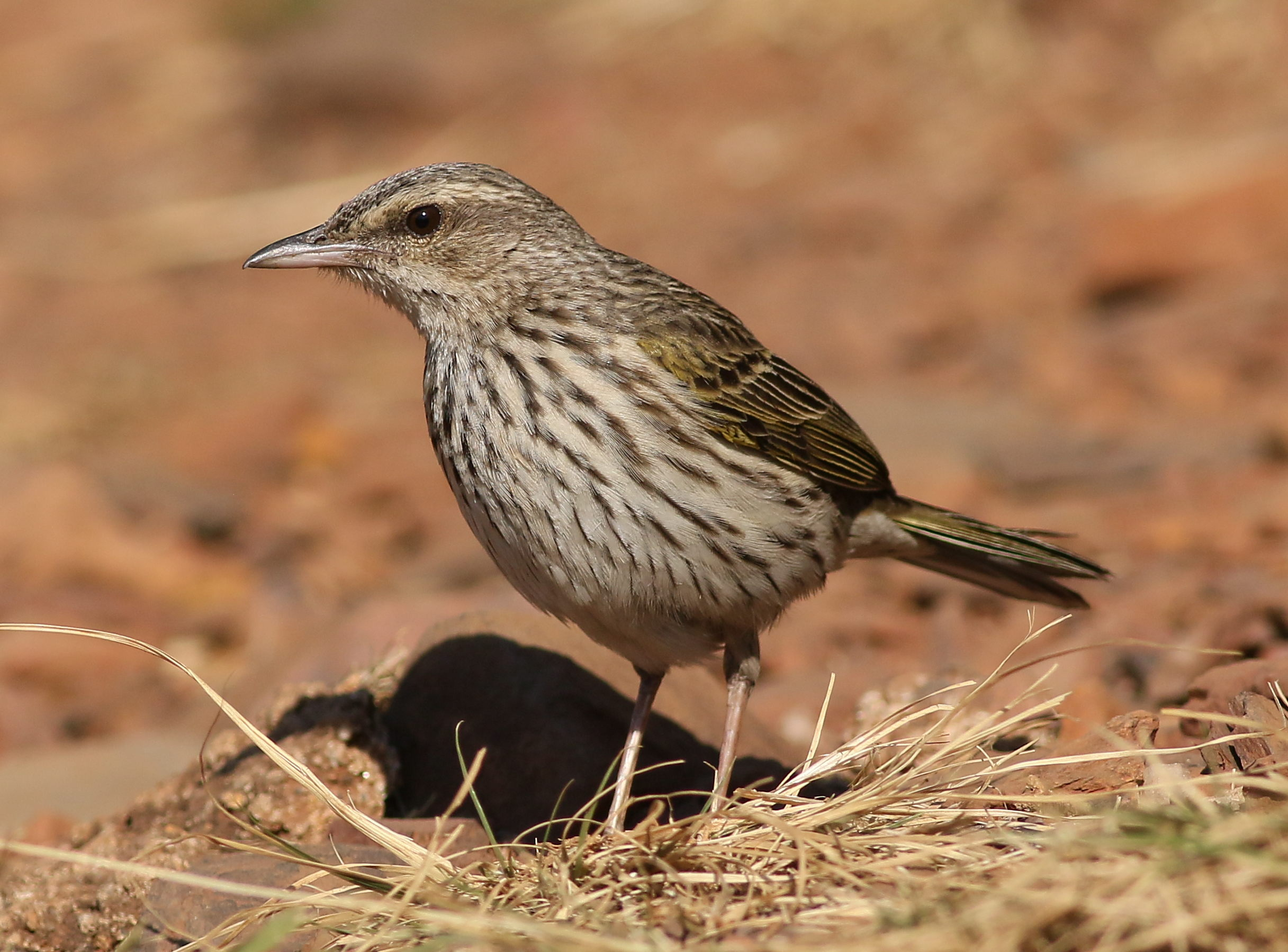
- The nominate subspecies in Walter Sisulu Botanical Garden, Gauteng

Conservation status
- Least Concern (IUCN 3.1)

Scientific classification
- Kingdom: Animalia
- Phylum: Chordata
- Class: Aves
- Order: Passeriformes
- Family: Motacillidae
- Genus: Anthus
- Species: A. lineiventris

Binomial name
- Anthus lineiventris Sundevall, 1850

= Striped pipit =

Species of bird

The striped pipit (Anthus lineiventris) is a species of bird in the family Motacillidae, which is native to Africa southwards of the equator.

== Range and habitat ==
It is found in Angola, Botswana, Burundi, DRC, Eswatini, Kenya, Malawi, Mozambique, Rwanda, South Africa, Tanzania, Zambia, and Zimbabwe. Its natural habitat is rocky areas in dry to mesic savanna.

== Taxonomy and systematics ==
The striped pipit forms a species complex with the African rock pipit.

=== Subspecies ===
There are two subspecies:

- A. l. stygium Clancey, 1952 – Angola, Kenya, DRC, Zambia, Botswana, Zimbabwe, Mozambique, South Africa
- A. l. lineiventris Sundevall, 1851 – Botswana, South Africa and Eswatini

== Description ==
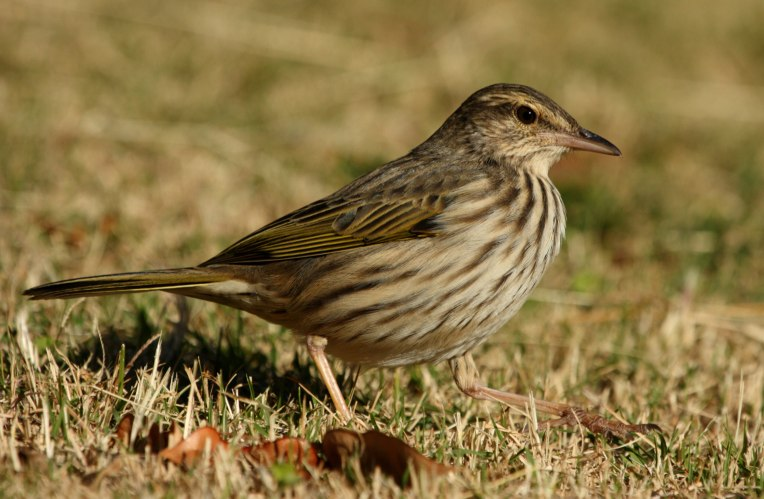
The nominate subspecies in Ithala Game Reserve, KwaZulu-Natal

It is a large pipit, ranging from 17 to 18 centimeters in length and weighing 31-37 grams. The wing coverts have yellow-green edges, and the underparts are olive brown with dark brown streaking.

=== Voice ===
A loud, penetrating, thrush-like song, uttered from a rock or perch.

== Diet ==
It feeds on insects and other arthropods, particularly grasshoppers.
