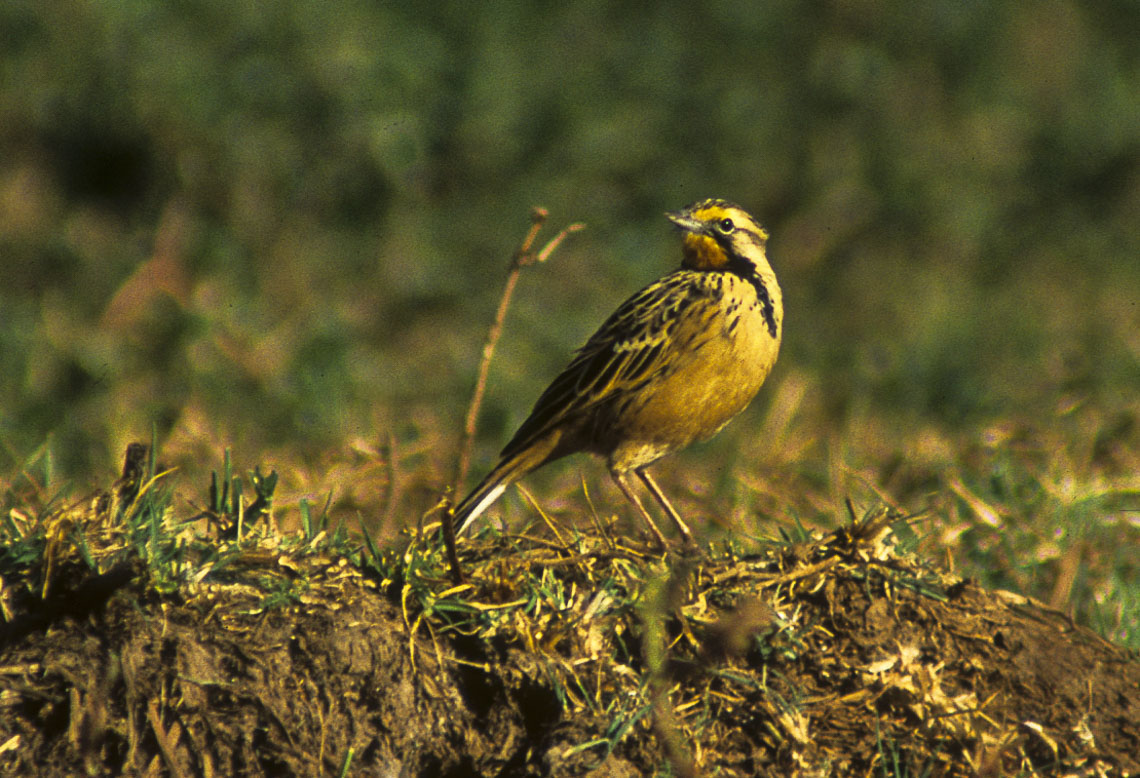

Conservation status
- Near Threatened (IUCN 3.1)

Scientific classification
- Kingdom: Animalia
- Phylum: Chordata
- Class: Aves
- Order: Passeriformes
- Family: Motacillidae
- Genus: Macronyx
- Species: M. flavicollis

Binomial name
- Macronyx flavicollis Rüppell, 1840

= Abyssinian longclaw =

Species of bird

The Abyssinian longclaw (Macronyx flavicollis) is a species of bird in the family Motacillidae. It is endemic to Ethiopia.

== Characteristics ==
Abyssinian longclaws are typically brown to black colored on their back, and there are white marks on the tail that are only visible during flight. On the neck and the supercilium (a stripe of plumage on the head) it is saffron colored. Around the base of the neck there is a black band described as a "necklace". Sometimes the necklace can present as a narrow collection of spots around the neck as well. The rest of the body varies in color but usually has black stripes. The normal length for the Abyssinian longclaw is around 20 cm (7.9 in).

=== Reproduction ===
The Abyssinian longclaw typically breeds between the months of June and August. When laying eggs, they tend to return to a nest they have built and lay between two to four eggs at a time.

== Habitat ==
The bird's natural habitat is in the wet grasslands of Ethiopia. It lives in subtropical to tropical areas of high altitudes.

The Abyssinian longclaw is very similar in both appearance and behavior to the yellow-throated longclaw (Macronyx croceus) of other parts of Africa. It is a common grassland bird of the western and south eastern Ethiopian Highlands, except in the extreme north where it does not occur.

== Conservation ==
The IUCN Red List categorizes the Abyssinian longclaw as "Near Threatened". The area that the bird tends to live in is 453,000 km^{2} (175,000 sq mi) large, and its frequency was described during a 1995 survey as "widespread" but "uncommon". The area of the Bale Mountains which Abyssinian longclaws live in has been undergoing habitat loss and degradation of the environment, which has led to the suspicion that the population of the birds is decreasing accordingly. Studies on the population trend are limited and there has been no direct count of the quantity of individuals.
