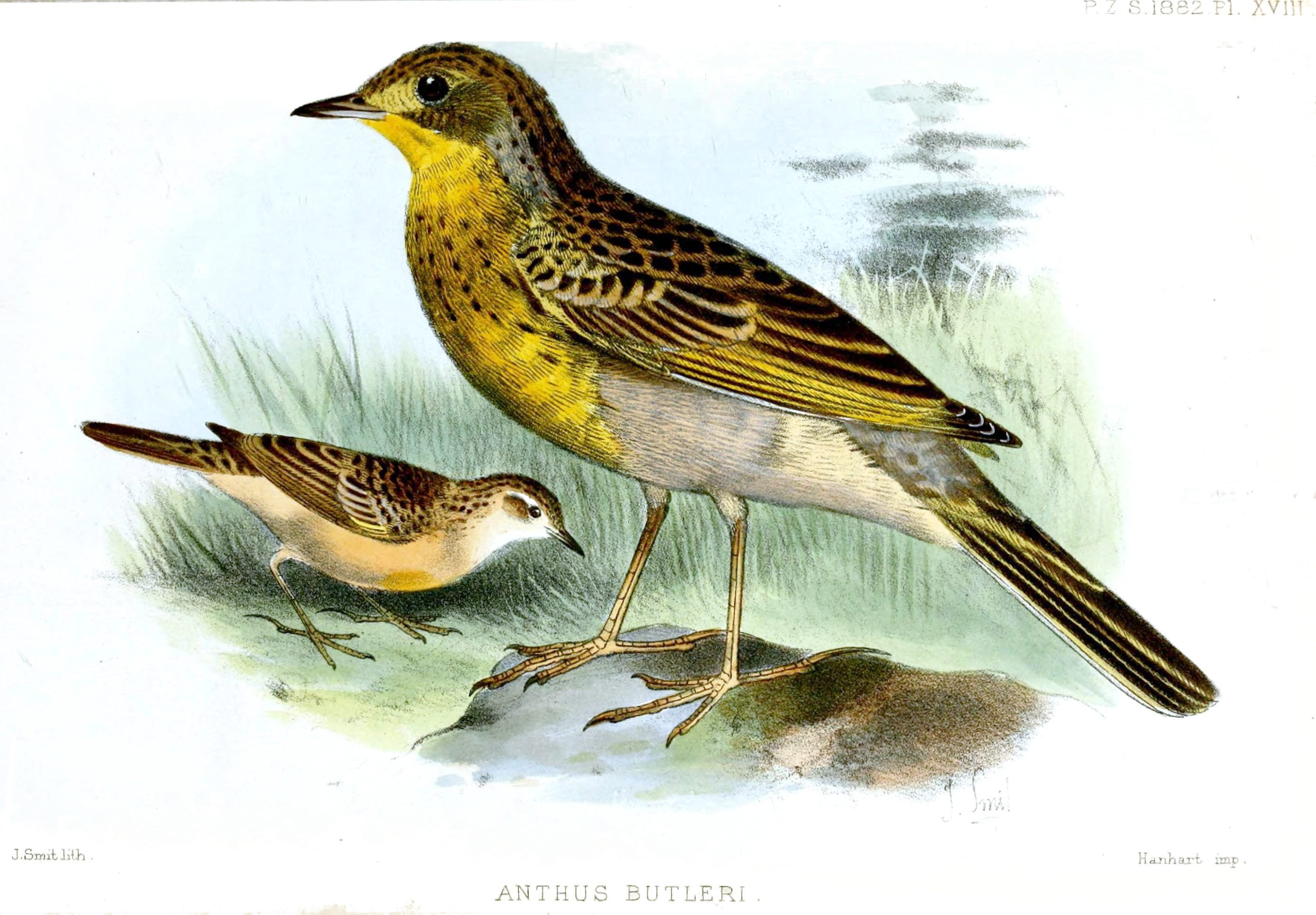

Conservation status
- Vulnerable (IUCN 3.1)

Scientific classification
- Kingdom: Animalia
- Phylum: Chordata
- Class: Aves
- Order: Passeriformes
- Family: Motacillidae
- Genus: Hemimacronyx; Roberts, 1922
- Species: H. chloris

Binomial name
- Hemimacronyx chloris (Lichtenstein, MHC, 1842)

Synonyms
- Anthus chloris (protonym)

= Yellow-breasted pipit =

Species of bird

The yellow-breasted pipit (Hemimacronyx chloris) is a species of bird in the pipit and wagtail family Motacillidae that is found in the Drakensberg region of South Africa.

== Taxonomy ==
The yellow-breasted pipit was formally described in 1842 as Anthus chloris by the German naturalist Hinrich Lichtenstein based on a specimen from Kaffirland, now the Eastern Cape of South Africa. The specific epithet is from Ancient Greek χλωρις/khlōris, χλωριδος/khlōridos meaning "greenfinch". The yellow-breasted pipit is now the only species placed in the genus Hemimacronyx that was introduced in 1922 by South African zoologist Austin Roberts. The genus name combines the Ancient Greek ἡμι-/hēmi- meaning "small" with the genus Macronyx that had been introduced by William Swainson in 1827. The species is monotypic: no subspecies are recognised.

The taxonomy is unsettled. A 2019 molecular genetic study by Darren Pietersen and collaborators found that the yellow-breasted pipit was embedded in a clade containing the longclaws in the genus Macronyx which in turn was embedded in the genus Anthus.

== Description ==
The yellow-breasted pipit has a bright yellow breast during breeding plumage, which fades to a buffy breast with a yellowish belly during non-breeding season. It has a scaled, brown back with white outer tail feathers. Unlike most other pipits, it has a grey lower mandible during non-breeding.

== Distribution and habitat ==
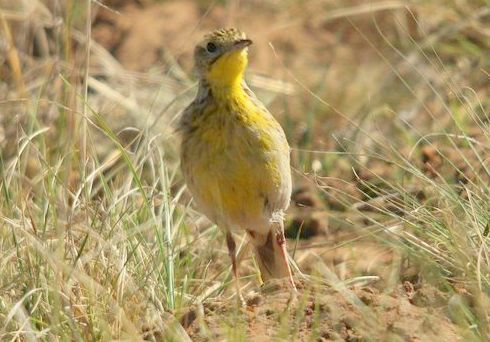
Yellow-breasted pipit

It is endemic to southern Africa, occurring along the eastern escarpment of South Africa with marginal crossover into Lesotho. It occurs from the town of Dullstroom (north) to Catchart (south).

Its natural habitats are subtropical or tropical high-altitude grassland, arable land, and pastureland. It is threatened by habitat loss, and there is evidence that its range has contracted over recent decades, especially in the Eastern Cape.

== Breeding ==
The yellow-breasted pipit breeds in the summer months (mostly between November and February) in sub-montane grasslands above 1400 m. They prefer grasslands where fires occur every 2–3 years with moderate levels of grazing. During the non-breeding season, some descend to lower elevations.

== Conservation ==
Yellow-breasted pipits are currently considered vulnerable due to the continuous decline of their range, their decreasing population size and fragmented populations. Apart from habitat loss due to agriculture, overgrazing and incompatible fire regimes, the increasing of open-cast coal mines has also restricted the distribution of this species. Various other species of great conservation concern co-inhabit the grasslands that this pipit occurs in, including Botha's and Rudd's Lark.
