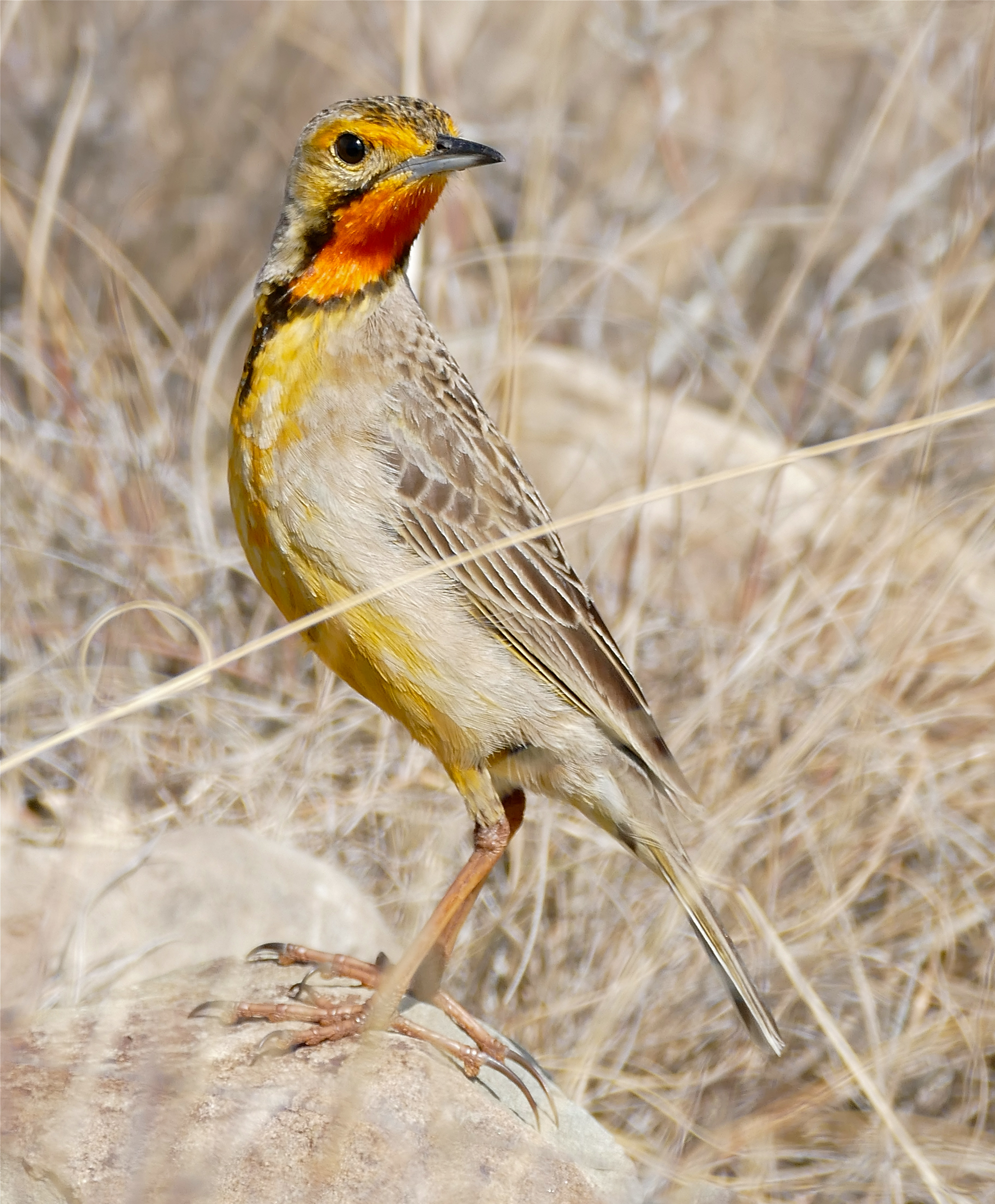

Conservation status
- Least Concern (IUCN 3.1)

Scientific classification
- Kingdom: Animalia
- Phylum: Chordata
- Class: Aves
- Order: Passeriformes
- Family: Motacillidae
- Genus: Macronyx
- Species: M. capensis

Binomial name
- Macronyx capensis (Linnaeus, 1766)

Synonyms
- Alauda capensis Linnaeus, 1766

= Cape longclaw =

Species of bird

The Cape longclaw or orange-throated longclaw (Macronyx capensis) is a passerine bird in the family Motacillidae, which comprises the longclaws, pipits and wagtails. It occurs in Southern Africa in Zimbabwe and southern and eastern South Africa. This species is found in coastal and mountain grassland, often near water.

== Taxonomy ==
In 1760 the French zoologist Mathurin Jacques Brisson included a description of the Cape longclaw in his Ornithologie based on a specimen collected from the Cape of Good Hope. He used the French name L'alouette du Cap de Bonne Espérance and the Latin Alauda Capitis Bonae Spei. Although Brisson coined Latin names, these do not conform to the binomial system and are not recognised by the International Commission on Zoological Nomenclature. When in 1766 the Swedish naturalist Carl Linnaeus updated his Systema Naturae for the twelfth edition, he added 240 species that had been previously described by Brisson. One of these was the Cape longclaw. Linnaeus included a brief description, coined the binomial name Alauda capensis and cited Brisson's work. The specific name capensis denotes the Cape of Good Hope. The species is now placed in the genus Macronyx that was introduced by the English naturalist William Swainson in 1827 with the Cape longclaw as the type species.

Two subspecies are recognised:

- M. c. capensis (Linnaeus, 1766) – southwest, south South Africa
- M. c. colletti Schou, 1908 – southeast Botswana and Zimbabwe to Mozambique and east South Africa

== Description ==
The Cape longclaw is a 19–20 cm long. The adult male has a grey head with a buff supercilium and a streaked blackish back. It has a bright orange gorget, black breast band and otherwise yellow underparts. The female is duller, having a yellow throat and much weaker breast band. The juvenile has a dirty yellow throat, indistinct breast band, and yellowish white underparts.

The Cape longclaw is usually found in pairs throughout the year. It feeds on the ground on insects and some seeds. The song is a musical cheewit cheewit, the contact call is tsweet, and there is also a mewling alarm call. Typically not found in larger groups than two, a breeding pair or more often singly. Another behavioural characteristic is the tendency of birds to stand on top of stones, anthills or large grass clumps. While doing so birds stand upright with their breast extended.

This species has a striking resemblance to the unrelated icterid meadowlarks, grassland birds of the Americas. This is presumably due to convergent evolution.
