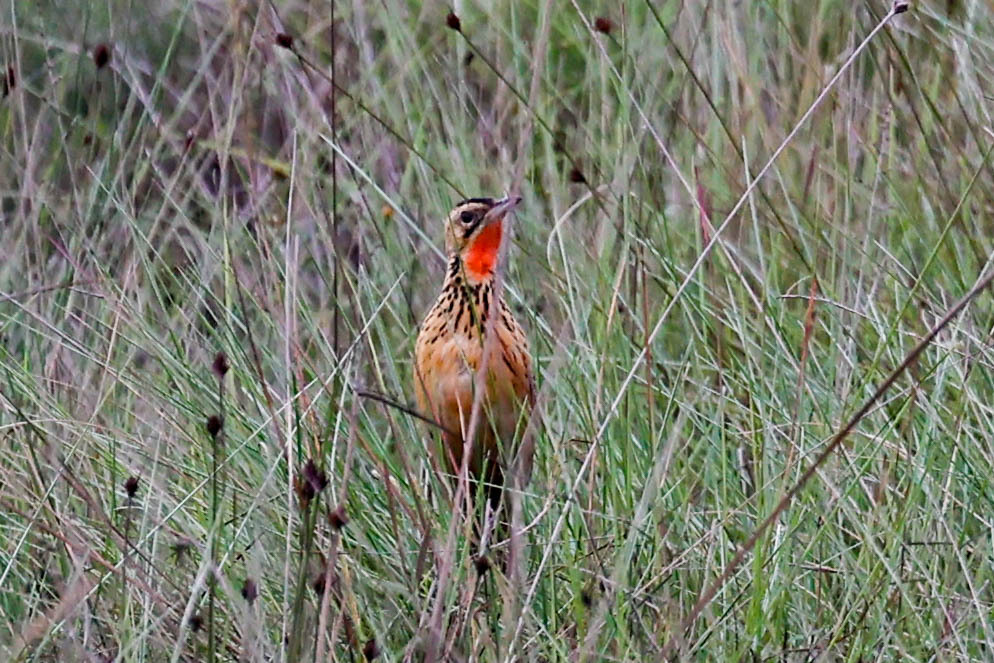

Conservation status
- Least Concern (IUCN 3.1)

Scientific classification
- Kingdom: Animalia
- Phylum: Chordata
- Class: Aves
- Order: Passeriformes
- Family: Motacillidae
- Genus: Macronyx
- Species: M. grimwoodi

Binomial name
- Macronyx grimwoodi Benson, 1955

= Grimwood's longclaw =

Species of bird

Grimwood's longclaw (Macronyx grimwoodi) is a species of bird in the family Motacillidae. It is found in Angola, Democratic Republic of the Congo, and Zambia. Its natural habitat is subtropical or tropical seasonally wet or flooded lowland grassland.
