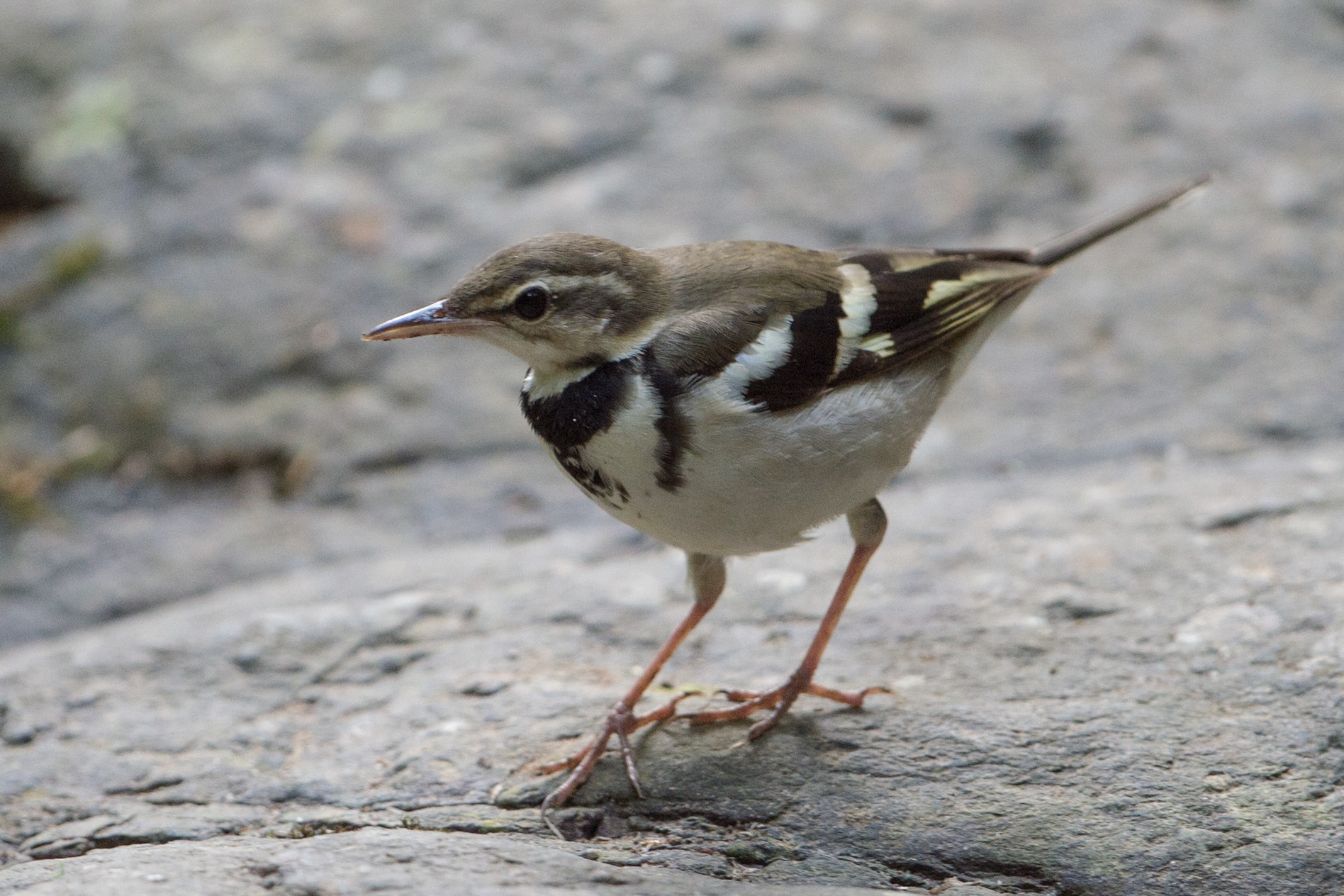

Conservation status
- Least Concern (IUCN 3.1)

Scientific classification
- Kingdom: Animalia
- Phylum: Chordata
- Class: Aves
- Order: Passeriformes
- Family: Motacillidae
- Genus: Dendronanthus; Blyth, 1844
- Species: D. indicus

Binomial name
- Dendronanthus indicus (Gmelin, JF, 1789)

Synonyms
- Limonidromus indicus Motacilla indica Nemoricola indica

= Forest wagtail =

Species of bird

The forest wagtail (Dendronanthus indicus) is a medium-sized passerine bird in the wagtail family Motacillidae. It has a distinctive plumage that sets it apart from other wagtails and has the habit of wagging its tail sideways unlike the usual up and down movements of the other wagtail species. It is the only wagtail species that nests in trees. It is found mainly in forested habitats, breeding in the temperate parts of east Asia and wintering across tropical Asia from India to Indonesia.

== Taxonomy ==
The forest wagtail was formally described in 1789 by the German naturalist Johann Friedrich Gmelin in his revised and expanded edition of Carl Linnaeus's Systema Naturae. He placed it with the wagtails in the genus Motacilla and coined the binomial name Motacilla indica. The specific epithet is from Latin indicus meaning "Indian". Gmelin based his account on "La Bergeronnette gris des Indes" that had been described in 1782 by the French naturalist Pierre Sonnerat. The forest wagtail is now the only species placed in the genus Dendronanthus that was introduced in 1844 by the English zoologist Edward Blyth. The name Dendronanthus combines the Ancient Greek dendron meaning "tree" with the genus Anthus that was introduced for the pipits by Johann Matthäus Bechstein in 1805. The species is monotypic: no subspecies are recognised.

== Description ==
This is a distinctive wagtail, the only one placed in the genus Dendronanthus (all other wagtails are placed in Motacilla). The forest wagtail is 18 cm (7.1 in) in length, a slender bird with a long tail. The back and crown are olive brown, and the wings are black with two yellow wing bars and white tertial edges. There is a white supercilium, above a dark stripe through the eye. The underparts are white, apart from a black double breast band. The upper breast band is bib-like while the lower band is often broken. The sexes are similar in appearance. Young birds are more yellowish on the underside.

Call and song in winter, Anamalai Hills

The forest wagtail has a single-note call ('pink pink') given often while on the ground or even in high flight. In addition, the birds have a soft lilting song. The brown shrike (Lanius cristatus confusus) sometimes imitates the calls of the forest wagtail.

== Distribution and habitat ==
As its English and scientific names imply, this is a forest species, a distinction from all other wagtails. It is usually found in open areas of the woodland such as clearings. In winter it is found mainly in well-shaded forest habitats or along paths in coffee plantations and clearings in forests.

The breeding areas are in eastern Asia, parts of Korea, parts of China (Gansu, Anhui, Hunan) and parts of Siberia. Southern records of breeding from Assam have been questioned. It migrates to the warmer parts of Asia in winter and it has been suggested that they reach southern India and Sri Lanka via the Andaman Islands. It has been recorded as a vagrant in the Maldives and Australia.

It was formerly thought to winter only in southwestern India, passing through the rest of the peninsula on migration. But now it has been shown to winter in all of the southern part of the peninsula in addition to southwestern India.

== Behaviour and ecology ==
These wagtails are found singly or in small groups. They often forage in the trees and capture insects along the branches of trees. They may also forage on the ground like a pipit and when disturbed, it flies up into the trees with a sharp pink note. They can climb steep branches and will run rapidly along horizontal branches. They roost in the company of other wagtails among reeds.

== Breeding ==
The breeding season is May in northeastern India and June in the Amur region. The forest wagtail leaves the winter quarters towards the end of March from Sri Lanka and mid March from the Malay Peninsula, the last birds leaving around May. During particularly cold springs, the arrival in the summer breeding grounds near the Kedrovaya River (Ussuri Land) can be as late as the end of May. Males sing from May to July, and when calling the bird sways at each syllable. It is the only wagtail that builds nests on trees, often favouring oaks. It builds its cup-shaped nest made up of fine grass and rootlets matted with moss and cobwebs. The nest is built by the female alone and the male stands guard nearby. The usual clutch is five eggs, incubated by the female alone for about 13 to 15 days. Incubation begins before the full clutch is laid and the eggs hatch at intervals. The young fledge and leave the nest after about 10 to 12 days. Both the male and female take part in feeding the young. Like other wagtails, this species is insectivorous.

Apart from its unusual plumage pattern and habitat, the forest wagtail differs from its Motacilla relatives in its strange habit of swaying its tail from side to side, not wagging it up and down like other wagtails. The Japanese name Jokofury-sekirei (=sideways-swinging wagtail) ) is based on this habit. In Sri Lanka, they often search for maggots in cattle dung and for this reason are known as gomarita (=dung-spreader).

== Gallery ==
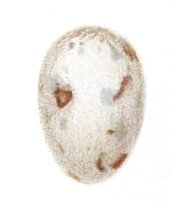
Egg pattern

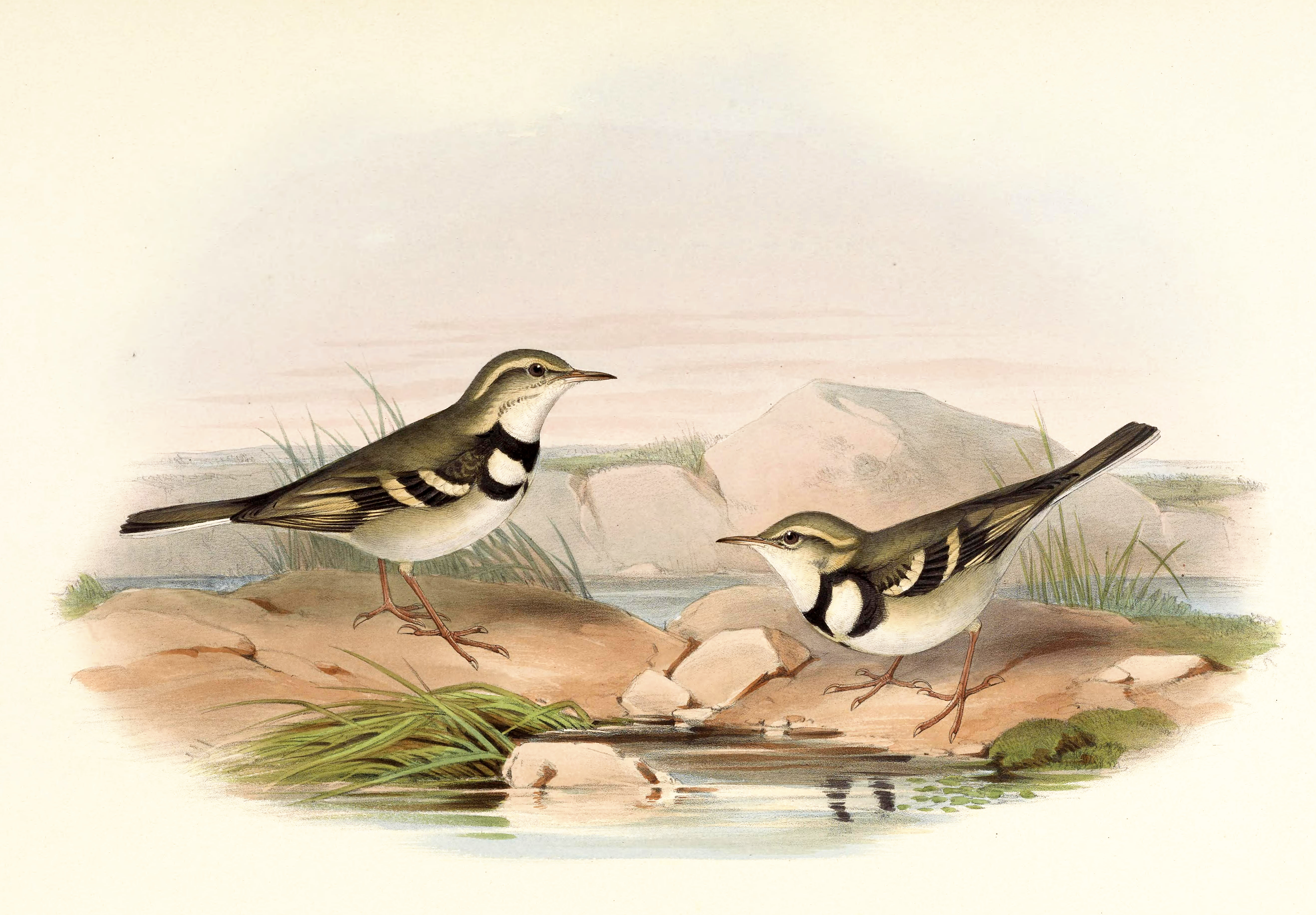
Painting from John Gould's Birds of Asia

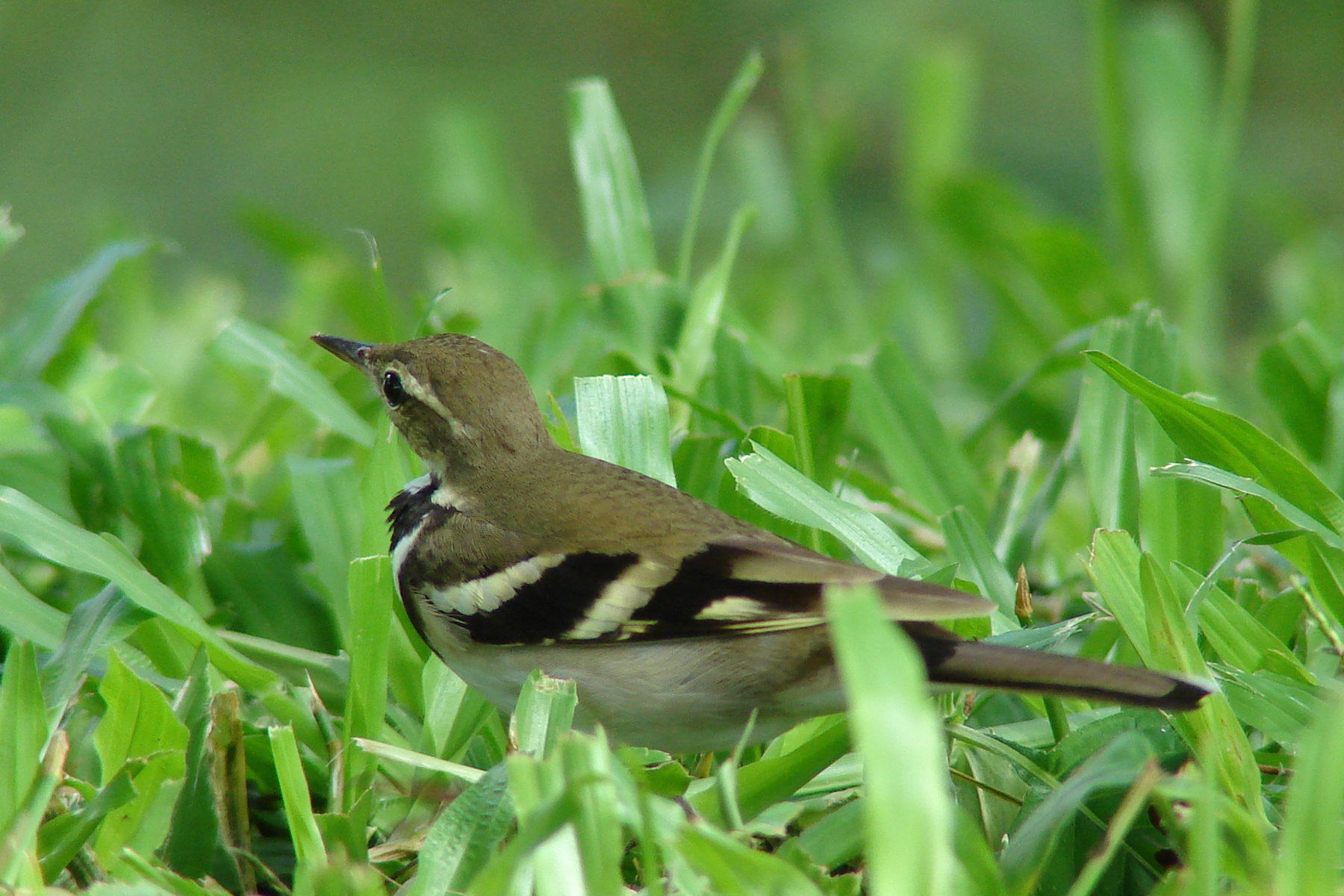
A forest wagtail (Dendronanthus indices) in the grass.

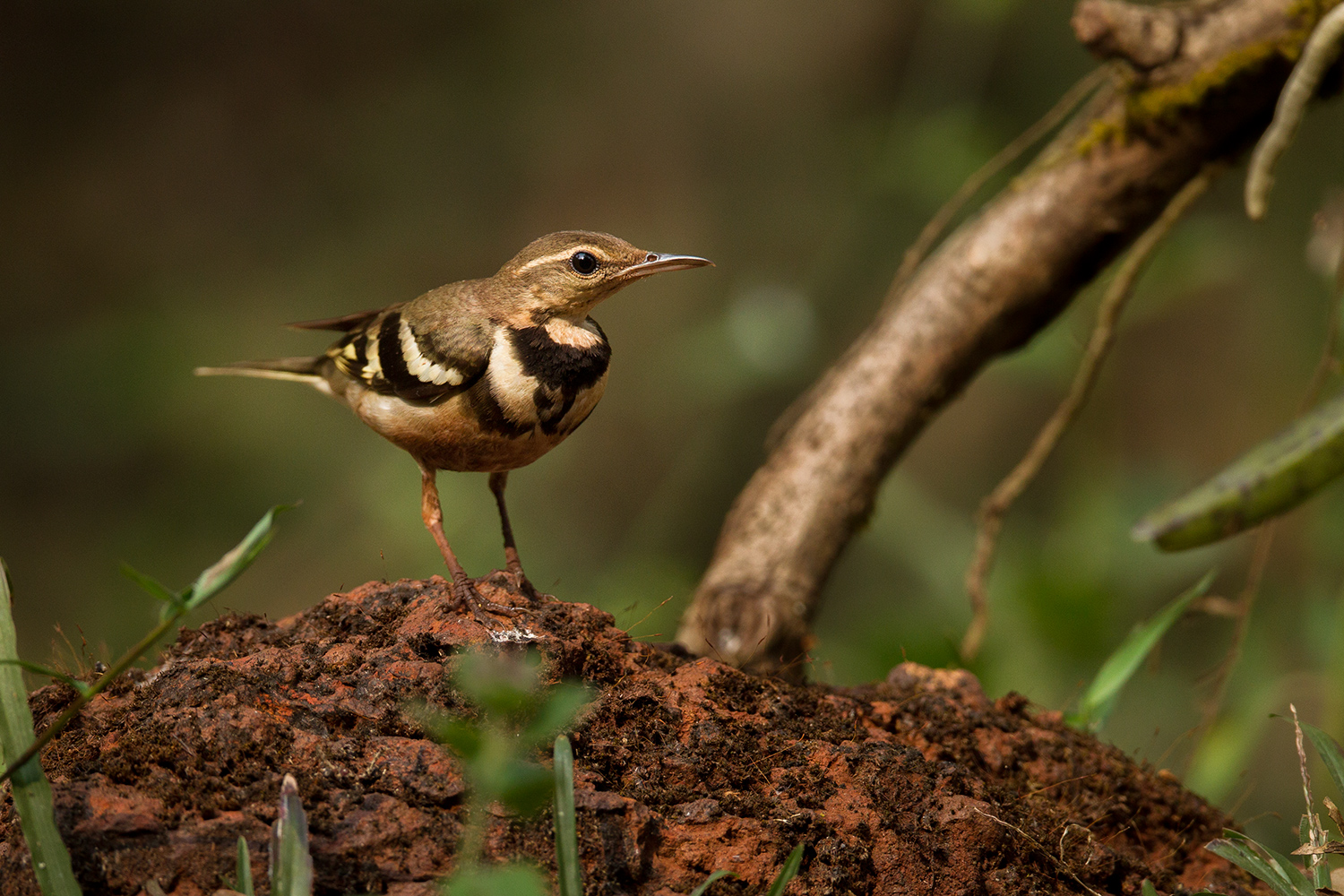
A forest wagtail at Dandeli tiger reserve, India
