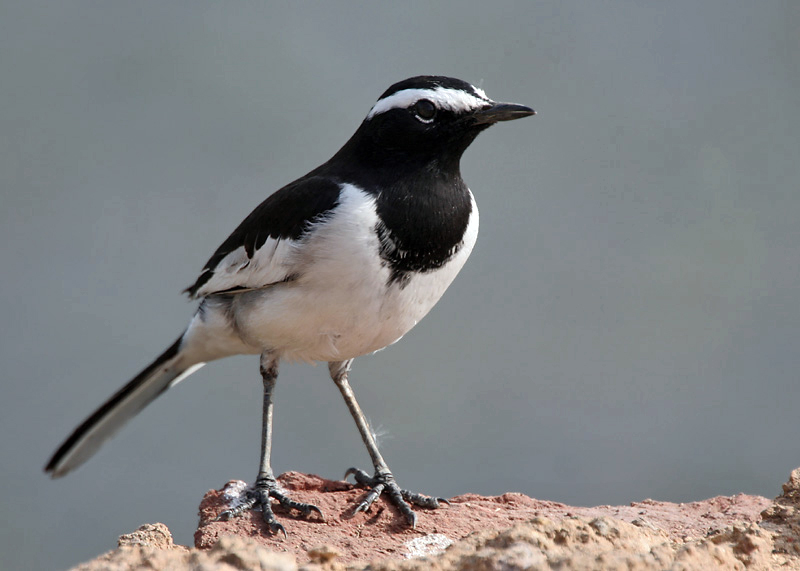
- White-browed wagtail (Motacilla maderaspatensis)

Scientific classification
- Kingdom: Animalia
- Phylum: Chordata
- Class: Aves
- Order: Passeriformes
- Parvorder: Passerida
- Family: Motacillidae; Horsfield, 1821

Genera
- Anthus; Tmetothylacus; Motacilla; Dendronanthus; Macronyx

= Motacillidae =

Family of birds

The wagtails, longclaws, and pipits are a family, Motacillidae, of small passerine birds with medium to long tails. Around 70 species occur in five genera. The longclaws are entirely restricted to the Afrotropics, and the wagtails are predominantly found in Europe, Africa, and Asia, with two species migrating and breeding in Alaska. The pipits have the most cosmopolitan distribution, being found mostly in the Old World, but occurring also in the Americas and oceanic islands such as New Zealand and the Falklands. Two African species, the yellow-breasted pipit and Sharpe's longclaw, are sometimes placed in a separate seventh genus, Hemimacronyx, which is closely related to the longclaws.

Most motacillids are ground-feeding insectivores of slightly open country. They occupy almost all available habitats, from the shore to high mountains. Wagtails prefer wetter habitats than the pipits. A few species use forests, including the forest wagtail, and other species use forested mountain streams, such as the grey wagtail or the mountain wagtail.

Motacillids take a wide range of invertebrate prey: insects are the most commonly taken, but also including spiders, worms, and small aquatic molluscs and arthropods. All species seem to be fairly catholic in their diets, and the most commonly taken prey for any particular species or population usually reflects local availability.

With the exception of the forest wagtail, they nest on the ground, laying up to six speckled eggs.

== Description ==
Wagtails, pipits, and longclaws are slender, small to medium-sized passerines, ranging from 14 to 17 cm (5.5 to 6.7 in) in length, with short necks and long tails. They have long, pale legs with long toes and claws, particularly the hind toe, which can be up to 4 cm in length in some longclaws. No sexual dimorphism in size is seen. Overall, the robust longclaws are larger than the pipits and wagtails. Longclaws can weigh as much as 64 g, as in Fülleborn's longclaw, whereas the weight range for pipits and wagtails is 15–31 g, with the smallest species being perhaps the yellowish pipit. The plumage of most pipits is dull brown and reminiscent of the larks, although some species have brighter plumages, particularly the golden pipit of north-east Africa. The adult male longclaws have brightly coloured undersides. The wagtails often have striking plumage, including grey, black, white, and yellow.

== Phylogeny ==
A molecular phylogenetic study published in 2019 sampled 56 of the 68 recognised species in the family Motacillidae and found that the species formed six major clades. The pipit genus Anthus was paraphyletic with respect to the longclaw genus Macronyx. The striped pipit (Anthus lineiventris) and the African rock pipit (Anthus crenatus) were nested with the longclaws in Macronyx. The type species of Anthus, the meadow pipit, was nested with the other Palearctic species in Clade 2.

- Motacillidae
  - - Motacilla – typical wagtails
    - - Clade 4 - Anthus – large-bodied African species
      - - - Clade 1 – Anthus – New World and small-bodied African species
          - Clade 2 – Anthus – Palearctic species
        - - Clade 3 – Anthus – African rock pipit (Anthus crenatus) and striped pipit (Anthus lineiventris)
          - Macronyx – longclaws – but includes yellow-breasted pipit (Anthus chloris) and golden pipit (Tmetothylacus tenellus)

== Species and genera ==
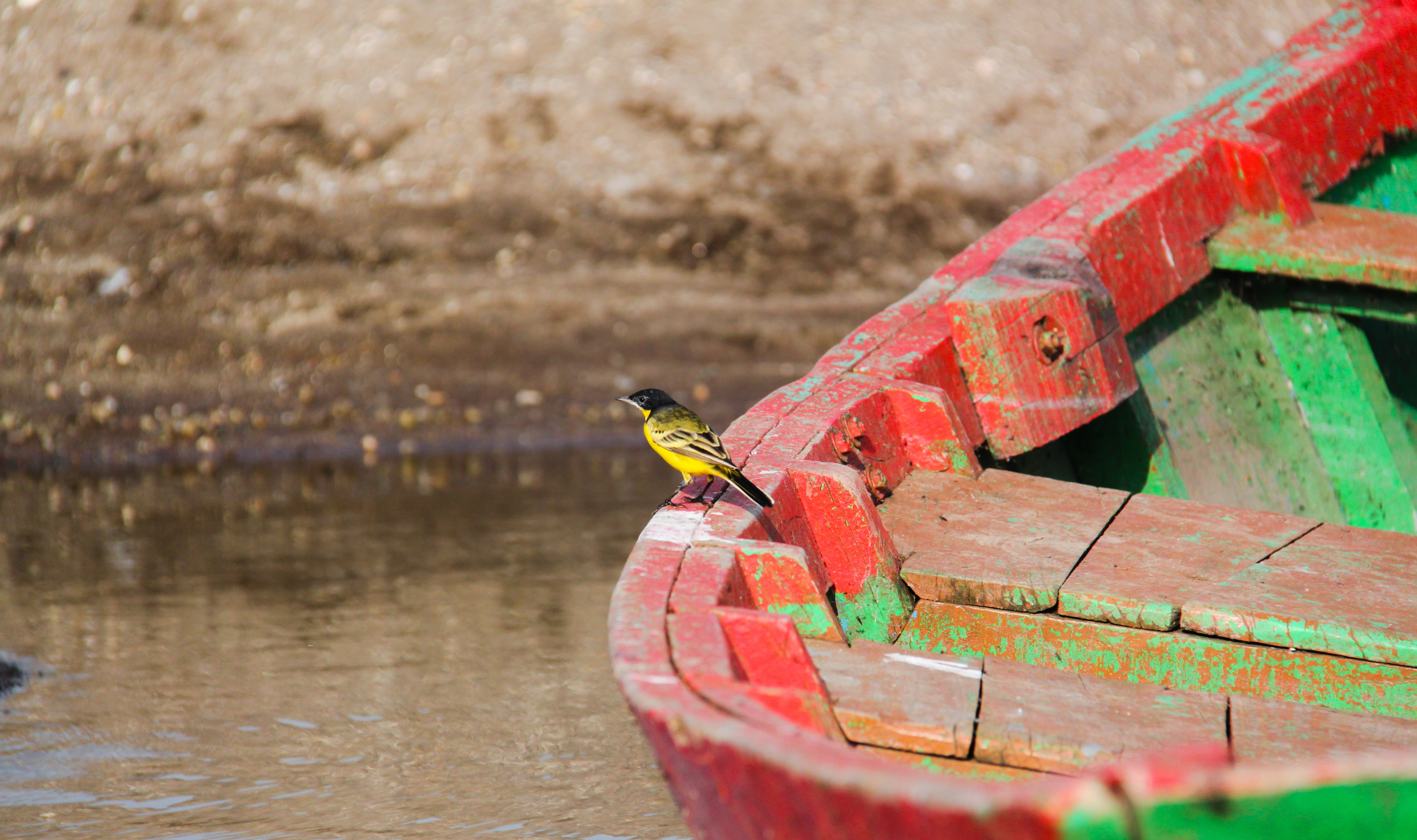
Black-headed wagtail, Motacilla flava feldegg

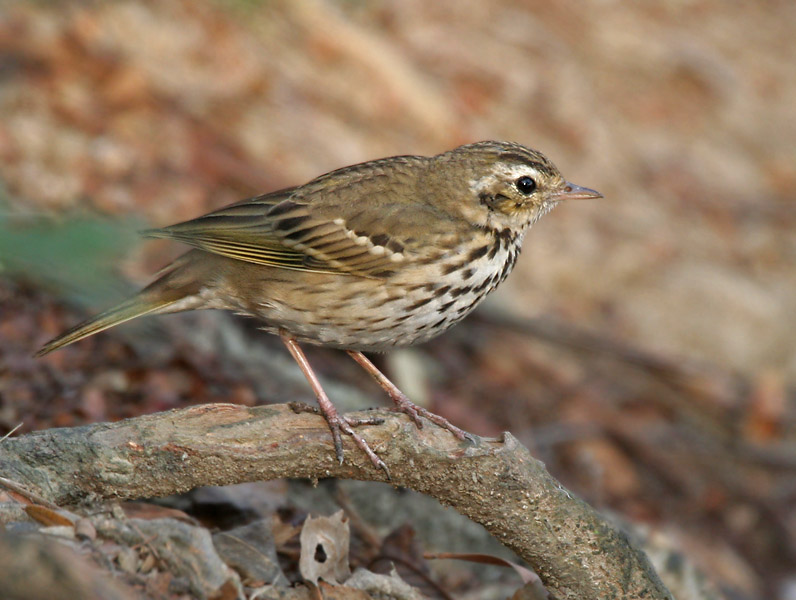
Olive-backed pipit, Anthus hodgsoni

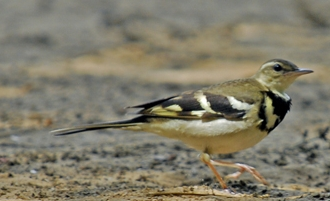
Forest wagtail, Dendronanthus indicus

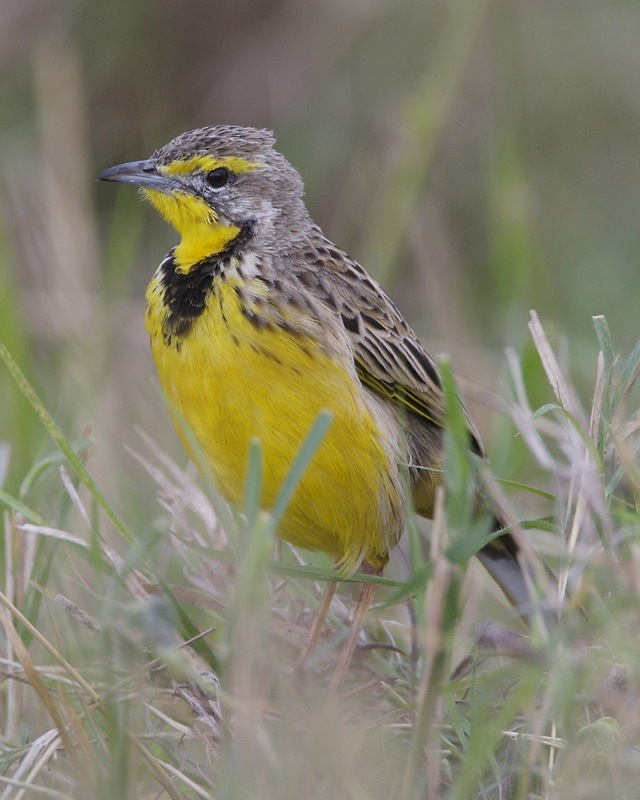
Yellow-throated longclaw, Macronyx croceus

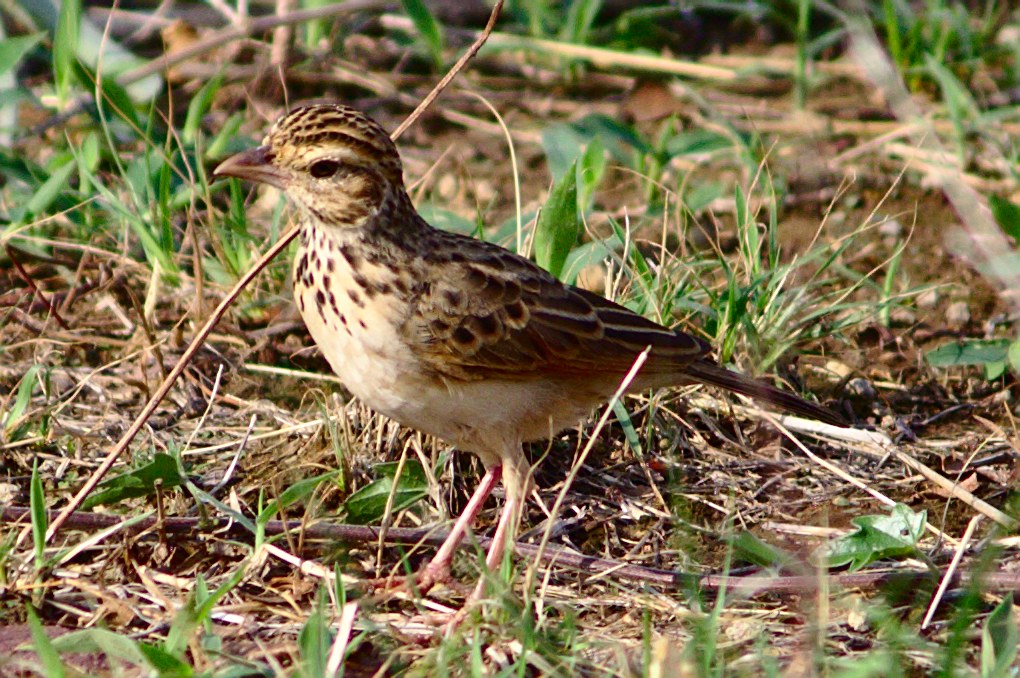
Paddyfield pipit, Anthus rufulus

Image	Genus	Living species
	Dendronanthus Blyth, 1844	Forest wagtail, Dendronanthus indicus
	Motacilla Linnaeus, 1758: typical wagtails	Western yellow wagtail, Motacilla flava – possibly paraphyletic; Eastern yellow wagtail, Motacilla tschutschensis – possibly paraphyletic; Citrine wagtail, Motacilla citreola – possibly paraphyletic; Cape wagtail, Motacilla capensis; Madagascar wagtail, Motacilla flaviventris; Grey wagtail, Motacilla cinerea; Mountain wagtail, Motacilla clara; White wagtail, Motacilla alba – possibly paraphyletic; Pied wagtail, Motacilla alba yarrellii; Black-backed wagtail, Motacilla alba lugens; African pied wagtail, Motacilla aguimp; Mekong wagtail, Motacilla samveasnae; Japanese wagtail, Motacilla grandis; White-browed wagtail, Motacilla madaraspatensis; São Tomé shorttail Motacilla bocagii
	Tmetothylacus Cabanis, 1879	Golden pipit, Tmetothylacus tenellus
	Macronyx Swainson, 1827: longclaws	Cape longclaw, Macronyx capensis; Yellow-throated longclaw, Macronyx croceus; Fülleborn's longclaw, Macronyx fuellebornii; Sharpe's longclaw, Macronyx sharpei - sometimes placed in genus Hemimacronyx; Abyssinian longclaw, Macronyx flavicollis; Pangani longclaw, Macronyx aurantiigula; Rosy-throated longclaw, Macronyx ameliae; Grimwood's longclaw, Macronyx grimwoodi
	Anthus Bechstein, 1805: typical pipits	Richard's pipit Anthus richardi; Paddyfield pipit Anthus rufulus; Australian pipit Anthus australis; New Zealand pipit Anthus novaeseelandiae; African pipit Anthus cinnamomeus; Mountain pipit Anthus hoeschi; Blyth's pipit Anthus godlewskii; Tawny pipit Anthus campestris; Long-billed pipit Anthus similis; Nicholson's pipit Anthus nicholsoni; Wood pipit Anthus nyassae; Buffy pipit Anthus vaalensis; Plain-backed pipit Anthus leucophrys; Long-legged pipit, Anthus pallidiventris; Meadow pipit Anthus pratensis; Tree pipit Anthus trivialis; Olive-backed pipit Anthus hodgsoni; Pechora pipit Anthus gustavi; Rosy pipit Anthus roseatus; Red-throated pipit Anthus cervinus; Buff-bellied pipit Anthus rubescens; Water pipit Anthus spinoletta; European rock pipit Anthus petrosus; Nilgiri pipit Anthus nilghiriensis; Upland pipit Anthus sylvanus; Berthelot's pipit Anthus berthelotii; Striped pipit Anthus lineiventris; African rock pipit Anthus crenatus; Short-tailed pipit Anthus brachyurus; Bushveld pipit Anthus caffer; Sokoke pipit Anthus sokokensis; Malindi pipit Anthus melindae; Yellow-breasted pipit Anthus chloris - sometimes placed in genus Hemimacronyx; Alpine pipit Anthus gutturalis; Sprague's pipit Anthus spragueii; Yellowish pipit Anthus chii; Short-billed pipit Anthus furcatus; Pampas pipit Anthus chacoensis; Correndera pipit Anthus correndera; South Georgia pipit Anthus antarcticus; Ochre-breasted pipit Anthus nattereri; Hellmayr's pipit Anthus hellmayri; Paramo pipit Anthus bogotensis; Madanga Anthus ruficollis
