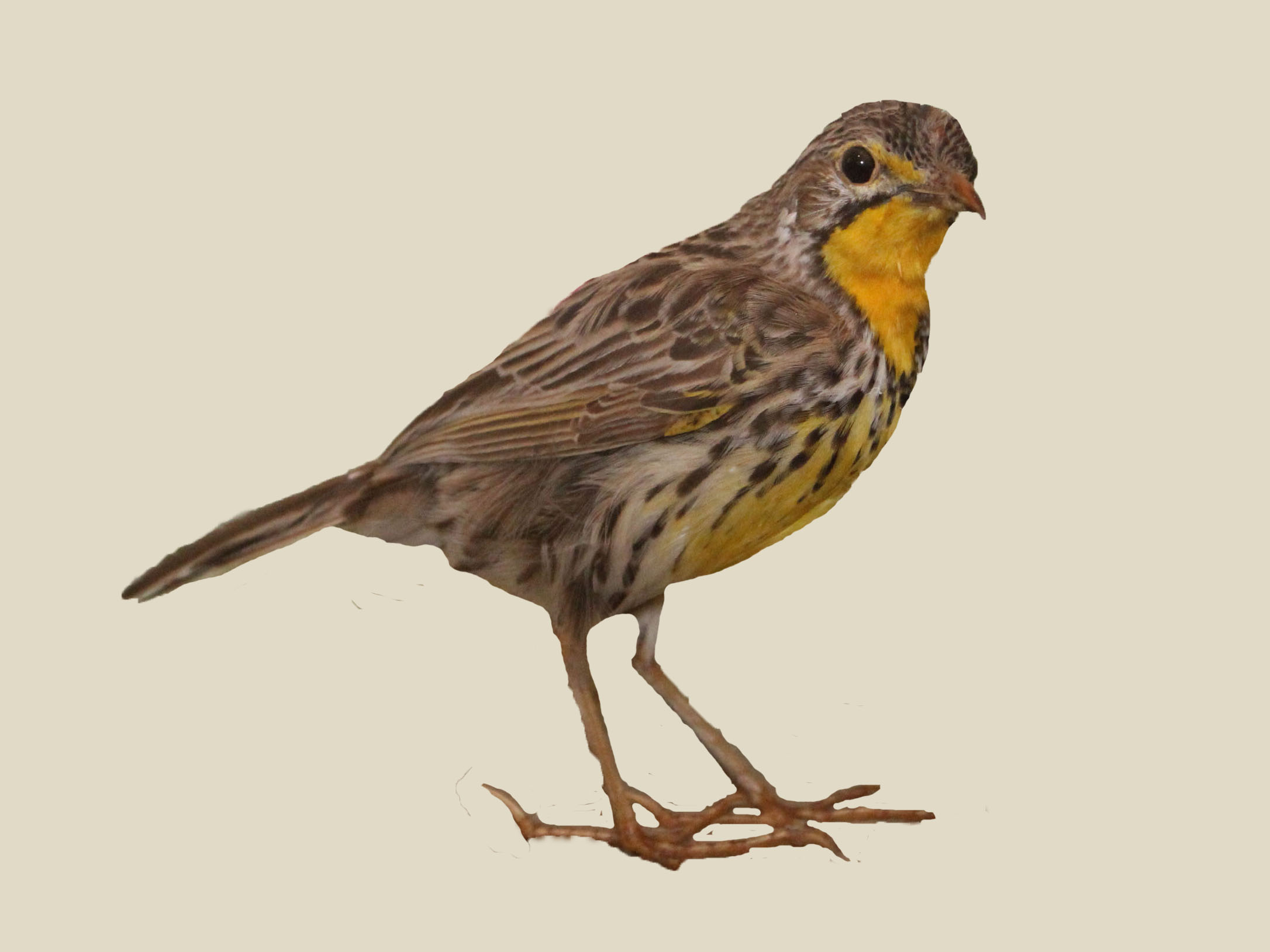
- Specimen at Nairobi National Museum

Conservation status
- Least Concern (IUCN 3.1)]

Scientific classification
- Kingdom: Animalia
- Phylum: Chordata
- Class: Aves
- Order: Passeriformes
- Family: Motacillidae
- Genus: Macronyx
- Species: M. aurantiigula

Binomial name
- Macronyx aurantiigula Reichenow, 1891

= Pangani longclaw =

Species of bird

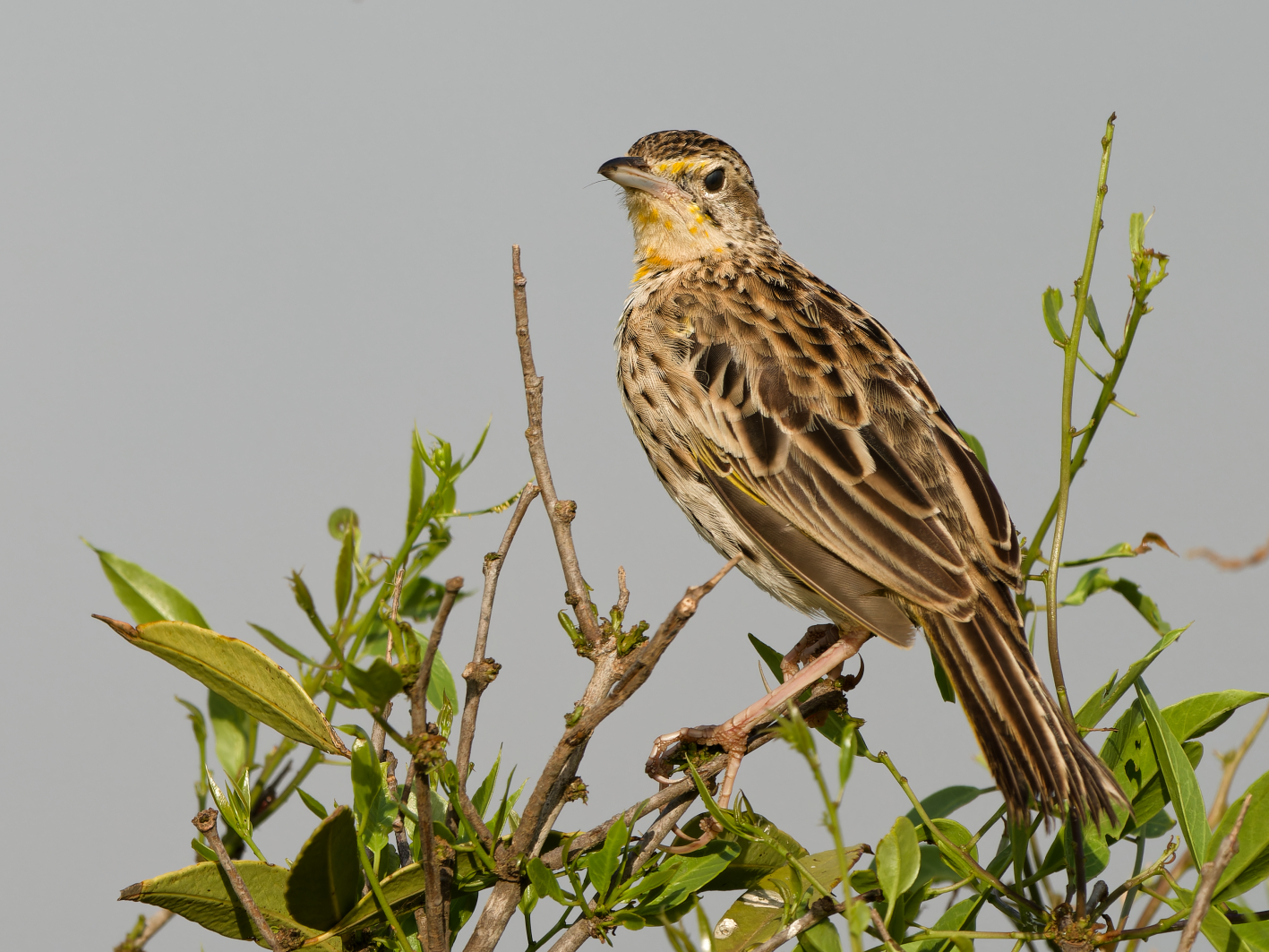
Pangani Longclaw

The Pangani longclaw (Macronyx aurantiigula) is a species of bird in the family Motacillidae, which includes the pipits and wagtails. It is found in Tanzania, Kenya and Somalia. The bird's natural habitats are dry savanna and subtropical or tropical dry lowland grassland. Primarily insectivorous, it forages in short grasslands and wetlands, using its long claws to scratch for prey such as grasshoppers and beetles. However, habitat loss due to agricultural expansion has led to population declines.

Originally described by German ornithologist Anton Reichenow in 1891, the Pangani longclaw is a member of the longclaw genus Macronyx. The genus name is derived from the Ancient Greek words μακρός/makros "long", and ονυξ/onyx "claw" or "talons". The species name is derived from the Latin words aurantium "orange", and gŭla "throat" or "gullet"

== Description ==
The Pangani longclaw measures around 20 cm (8 in) in length. As its species name suggests, it has a yellow-orange throat. This is bordered with a black necklace. The upperparts are mottled various shades of brown, and the belly is yellow. In immature birds, the belly is more buff than yellow and the dark breast band less distinct. The flanks are streaked black and buff. The flight is jerky. The call has been described as a high-pitched siuuweeeee, with a pitch that rises, falls then rises before fading away.

Its more orange throat helps distinguish it from the yellow-throated longclaw and Abyssinian longclaw, however the throats of female and older immature Pangani longclaws can be more yellow. The last species is also found further north in the Horn of Africa in Ethiopia.

A predominantly ground-dwelling bird, the Pangani longclaw inhabits grasslands, to an altitude of 1800 m (5500 ft).
