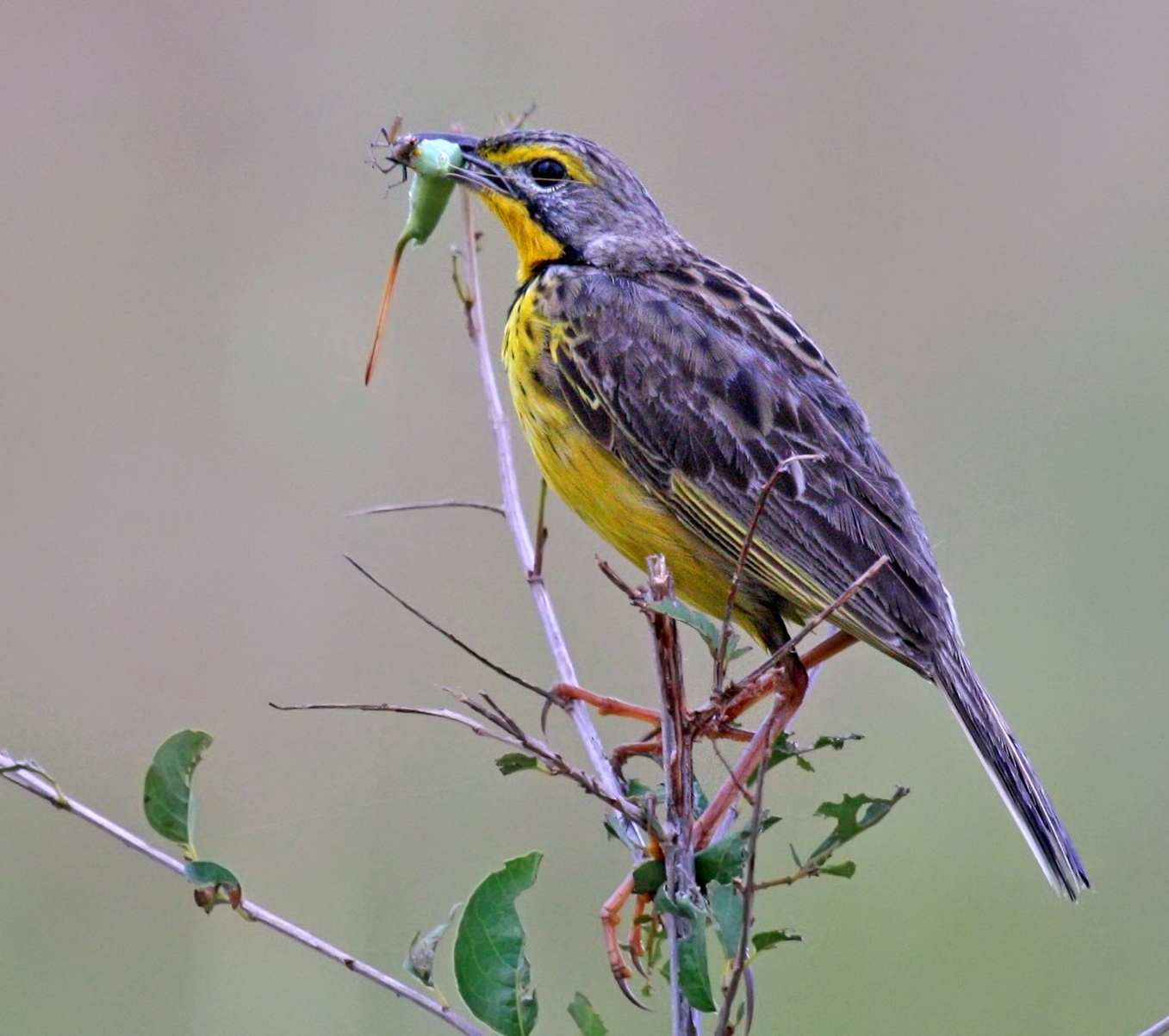
- Yellow-throated longclaw (Macronyx croceus)

Scientific classification
- Kingdom: Animalia
- Phylum: Chordata
- Class: Aves
- Order: Passeriformes
- Family: Motacillidae
- Genus: Macronyx; Swainson, 1827

Type species
- Alauda capensis Linnaeus, 1766

Species
- 8, see text

= Longclaw =

Longclaws

Genus of birds

The longclaws are a genus, Macronyx, of small African passerine birds in the family Motacillidae.

Longclaws are slender, often colorful, ground-feeding insectivores of open country. They are ground nesters, laying up to four speckled eggs. They are named for their unusually long hind claws, which are thought to help walk on grass. There are only between 10,000 and 19,000 Sharpe's longclaw left in Kenya.

The genus Macronyx was introduced by the English naturalist William Swainson in 1827 with the Cape longclaw as the type species. The name combines the Classical Greek words makros "long" or "great" and onux "claw".

== Species list ==
The genus contains the following eight species:

Image	Scientific name	Common name	Distribution
	Macronyx sharpei	Sharpe's longclaw	west and central Kenya.
	Macronyx flavicollis	Abyssinian longclaw	Ethiopia
	Macronyx fuelleborni	Fülleborn's longclaw	south-central Africa.
	Macronyx capensis	Cape longclaw	Southern Africa in Zimbabwe and southern and eastern South Africa.
	Macronyx croceus	Yellow-throated longclaw	Angola, Benin, Burkina Faso, Burundi, Cameroon, Central African Republic, Chad, Republic of the Congo, Democratic Republic of the Congo, Ivory Coast, Gabon, Gambia, Ghana, Guinea, Guinea-Bissau, Kenya, Lesotho, Liberia, Malawi, Mali, Mozambique, Niger, Nigeria, Rwanda, Senegal, Sierra Leone, Somalia, South Africa, South Sudan, Swaziland, Tanzania, Togo, Uganda, Zambia, and Zimbabwe.
	Macronyx aurantiigula	Pangani longclaw	Tanzania, Kenya and Somalia.
	Macronyx ameliae	Rosy-throated longclaw	Angola, Botswana, Democratic Republic of the Congo, Kenya, Malawi, Mozambique, Namibia, South Africa, Tanzania, Zambia, and Zimbabwe.
	Macronyx grimwoodi	Grimwood's longclaw	Angola, Democratic Republic of the Congo, and Zambia.
