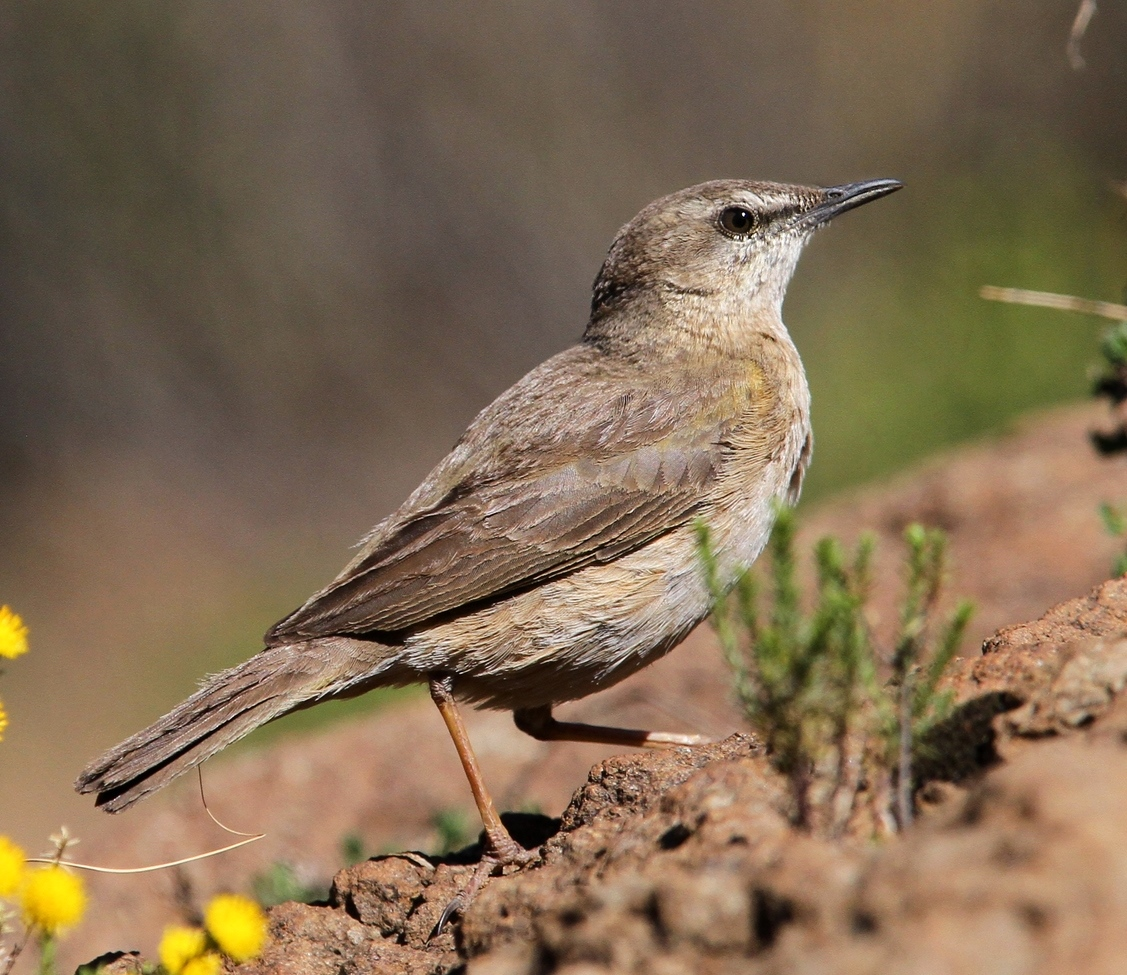
- In eastern Lesotho

Conservation status
- Near Threatened (IUCN 3.1)

Scientific classification
- Kingdom: Animalia
- Phylum: Chordata
- Class: Aves
- Order: Passeriformes
- Family: Motacillidae
- Genus: Anthus
- Species: A. crenatus

Binomial name
- Anthus crenatus Finsch & Hartlaub, 1870

= African rock pipit =

Species of bird

The yellow-tufted pipit or African rock pipit (Anthus crenatus) is a small-sized, passerine bird that is native to South Africa and Lesotho. The yellow-tufted pipit is commonly found in mountain terrain, and they create their habitats in high-altitude shrub-land, grassland, and rocky areas. This species is identified by its brown and gray feathers. The bird has a white-gray eyebrow and yellow markings within its wings and stomach. The call of the yellow-tufted pipit allows the bird to stand out from other pipit species. The bird produces a repeated "whee-tsrreeu" that is loud and high-pitched. The yellow-tufted pipit has a life expectancy ranging from two to three years old.

== Field identification ==
The yellow-tufted pipit is identified in the field by its brown and gray feathers. The species is further recognized by the marks of yellow on the stomach and wings. Its grayish, white eyebrow allows the yellow-tufted pipit to be spotted within the varying genera. The pipit has a dark brown beak and light brown, petite legs. The bird ranges in size from 17–18 centimeters (6.7–7.0 inches) and 29–32.5 grams (1.0–1.1 ounces). The species is sexually monomorphic.

== Geography and habitat ==
The yellow-tufted pipit is native to Africa, and is specifically found in South Africa and Lesotho. Isolated populations are located in Northern Cape Province. The yellow-tufted pipit creates habitats within rocky and bushy hills. The bird remains mainly at an elevation of 1,000 meters or higher. The yellow-tufted pipit resides in the Afrotropical biogeographical realm.

== Diet and lifestyle ==
The diet of the yellow-tufted pipit consists of insects like spiders and grasshoppers. The bird is reported to occasionally feed on seeds and other plants and berries. The yellow-tufted pipit lives a sedentary lifestyle as the bird does not make seasonal migrations and stays in one location.

== Life expectancy and breeding ==
The life expectancy for the yellow-tufted pipit ranges from two to three years. Newborn yellow-tufted pipits will begin to take flight in twelve to fourteen days, and the birds are able to begin breeding at the age of one. The breeding period for the yellow-tufted pipit takes place during November, December, and January. A female pipit will lay three to four eggs at a time, and the incubation period lasts at least 12–13 days. The eggs and newborn birds are protected in a nest made up of grass under a boulder or grass tuft. The juvenile yellow-tufted pipits are fed by both the mother and father.

== Conservation status ==
The conservation status of the yellow-tufted pipit is categorized as Near Threatened due to its decreasing population. As of 2021, its population is estimated to be between 3,300 – 8,900 mature individuals.
