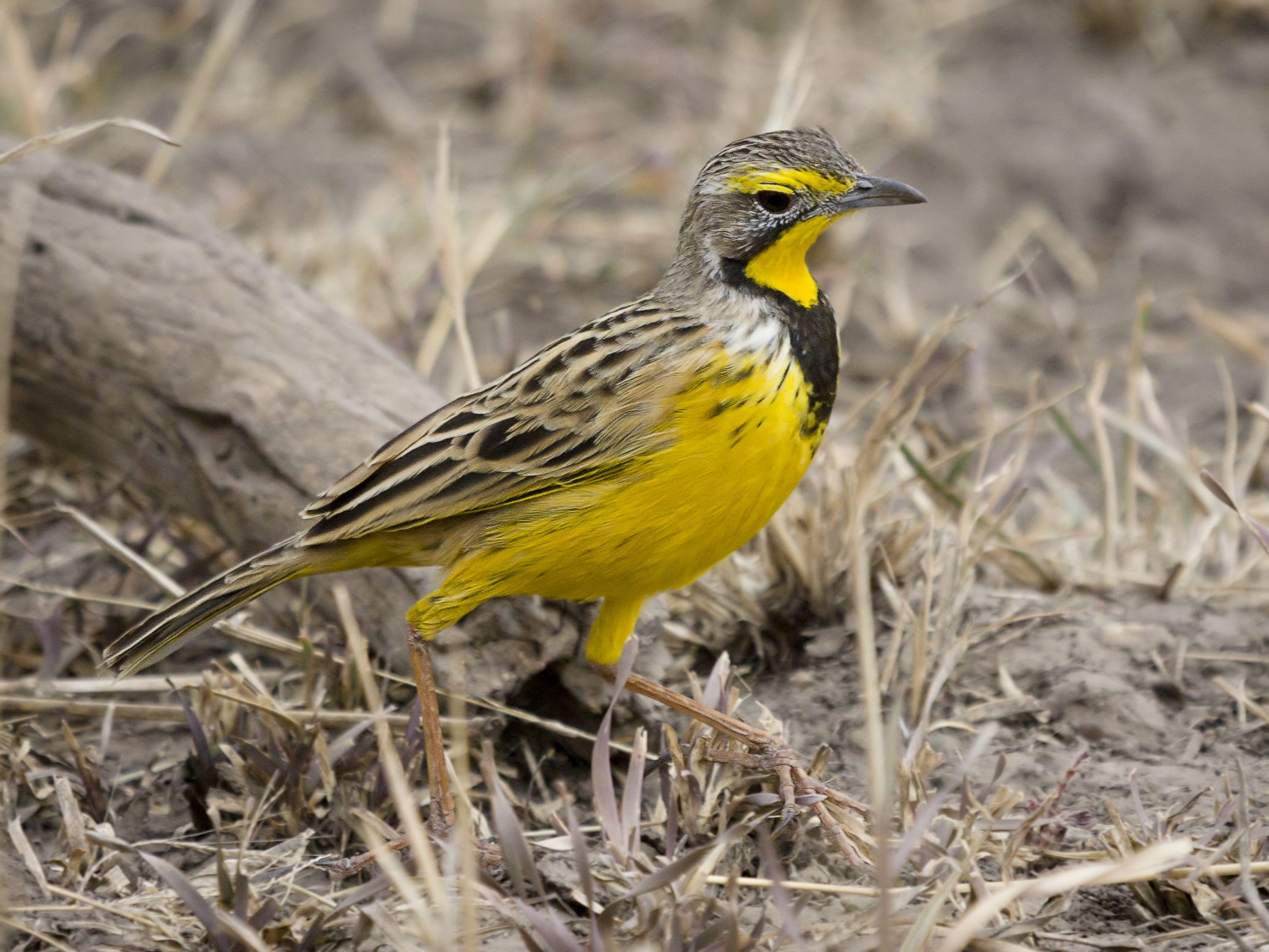
- In the Serengeti, Tanzania

Conservation status
- Least Concern (IUCN 3.1)

Scientific classification
- Kingdom: Animalia
- Phylum: Chordata
- Class: Aves
- Order: Passeriformes
- Family: Motacillidae
- Genus: Macronyx
- Species: M. croceus

Binomial name
- Macronyx croceus (Vieillot, 1816)

= Yellow-throated longclaw =

Species of bird

The yellow-throated longclaw (Macronyx croceus) is a species of bird in the family Motacillidae.

== Taxonomy and systematics ==
Despite sharing no recent common ancestor, the yellow-throated longclaw and its sister species in Macronyx are very similar in both coloration and behavior to the meadowlarks of North America, an example of convergent evolution.

== Description ==
They have yellow underparts and a black "bib" on the upper chest.

They may be distinguished from the closely related pangani longclaw by its yellow under tail-coverts, which the pangani lacks. The pangani also has an orange throat, whereas the yellow-throated does not.

== Behavior and ecology ==
Longclaws are generally solitary, except when found as mated pairs.

== Range ==
It is found in Angola, Benin, Burkina Faso, Burundi, Cameroon, Central African Republic, Chad, Republic of the Congo, Democratic Republic of the Congo, Eswatini, Ivory Coast, Gabon, Gambia, Ghana, Guinea, Guinea-Bissau, Kenya, Lesotho, Liberia, Malawi, Mali, Mozambique, Niger, Nigeria, Rwanda, Senegal, Sierra Leone, Somalia, South Africa, South Sudan, Tanzania, Togo, Uganda, Zambia, and Zimbabwe. Its natural habitats are dry savanna, subtropical or tropical seasonally wet or flooded lowland grassland, and sandy shores.

== Gallery ==
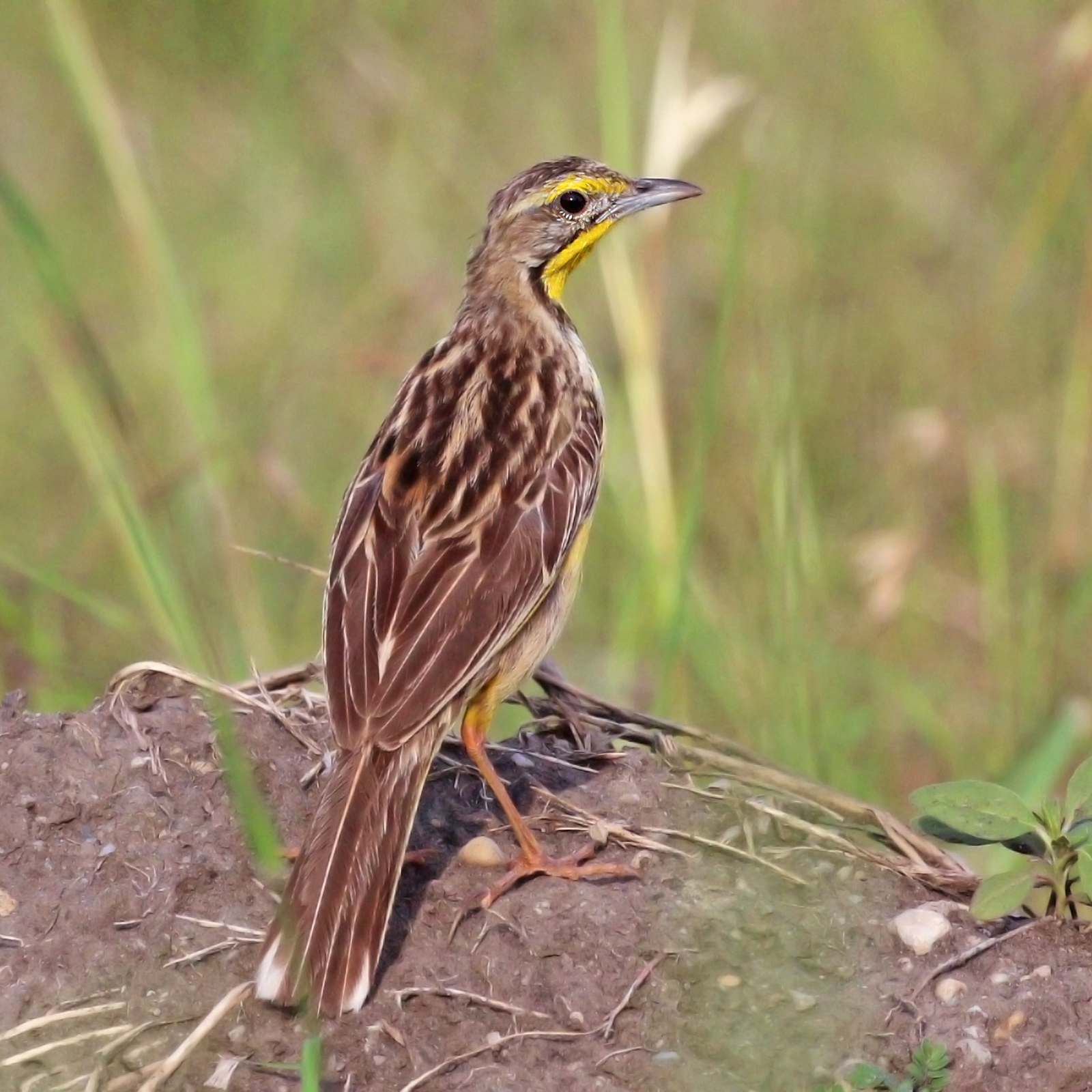
At Queen Elizabeth National Park, Uganda

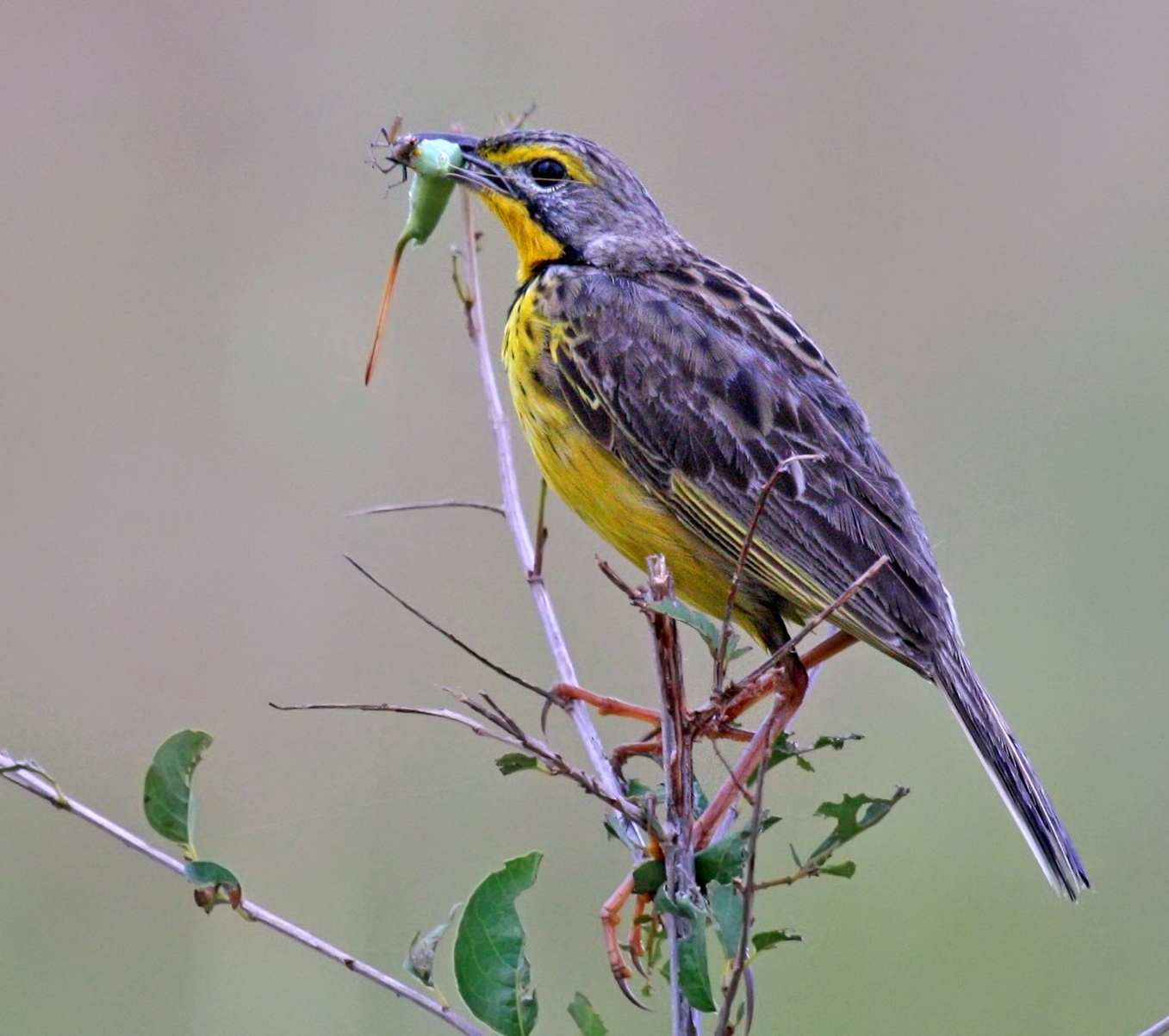
Eating a locust at Mikumi National Park, Tanzania
