= Tankwa Karoo National Park =

Conservation area west of Sutherland in the Western and Northern Cape

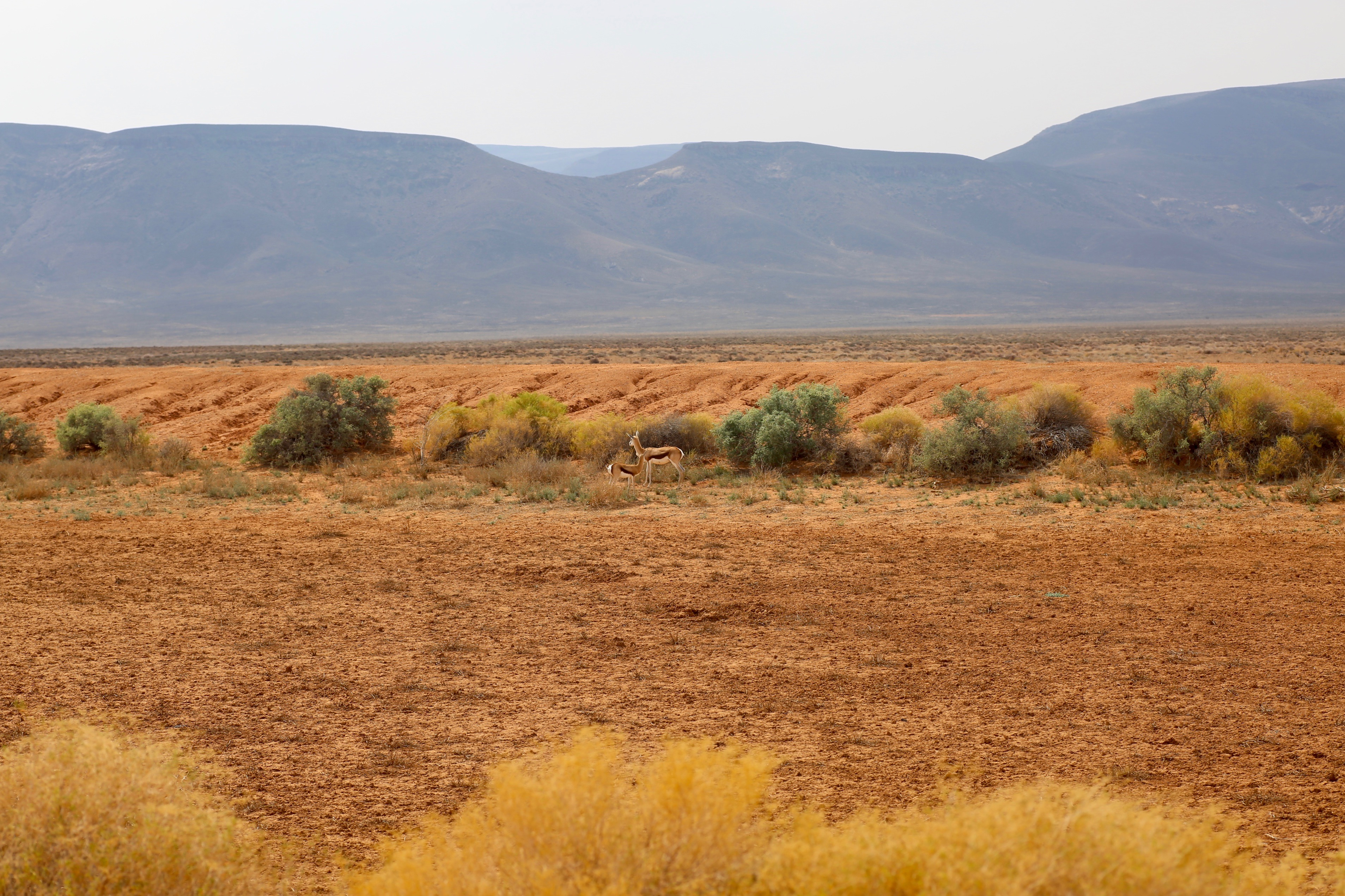
- Springboks in Tankwa Karoo National Park
- Location of the park
- Location: Northern Cape, South Africa
- Nearest city: Ceres
- Coordinates: 32°15′S 19°45′E
- Area: 1,436 km^{2} (554 sq mi)
- Established: 1986
- Governing body: South African National Parks
- Website: www.sanparks.org/parks/tankwa-karoo
- Tankwa Karoo National Park (South Africa)

Tankwa Karoo National Park is a national park in South Africa. The park lies about 70 km west of Sutherland and along the border of the Northern Cape and Western Cape in Succulent Karoo habitat; a biodiversity hotspot and one of the most arid regions of South Africa.

Before the park's proclamation, the only protected area of Succulent Karoo was the 2 square kilometre patch of the Gamkaberg Nature Reserve. Succulent Karoo has, together with the Cape Floral Kingdom, been declared a biodiversity hotspot by Conservation International.

== Geography ==
It is bounded on the east by the Roggeveld Mountains, on the west by the Cederberg, to the north by the Kouebokkeveld Mountains and on the south by the scattered foothills of the Koedoesberge and Klein Roggeveld Mountains, and the Tankwa River. The park's headquarters are located at Roodewerf. Distances from the nearest towns to the park's headquarters are: Ceres (180 km), Sutherland (120 km), Calvinia (110 km) and Middelpos (52 km).

== History ==
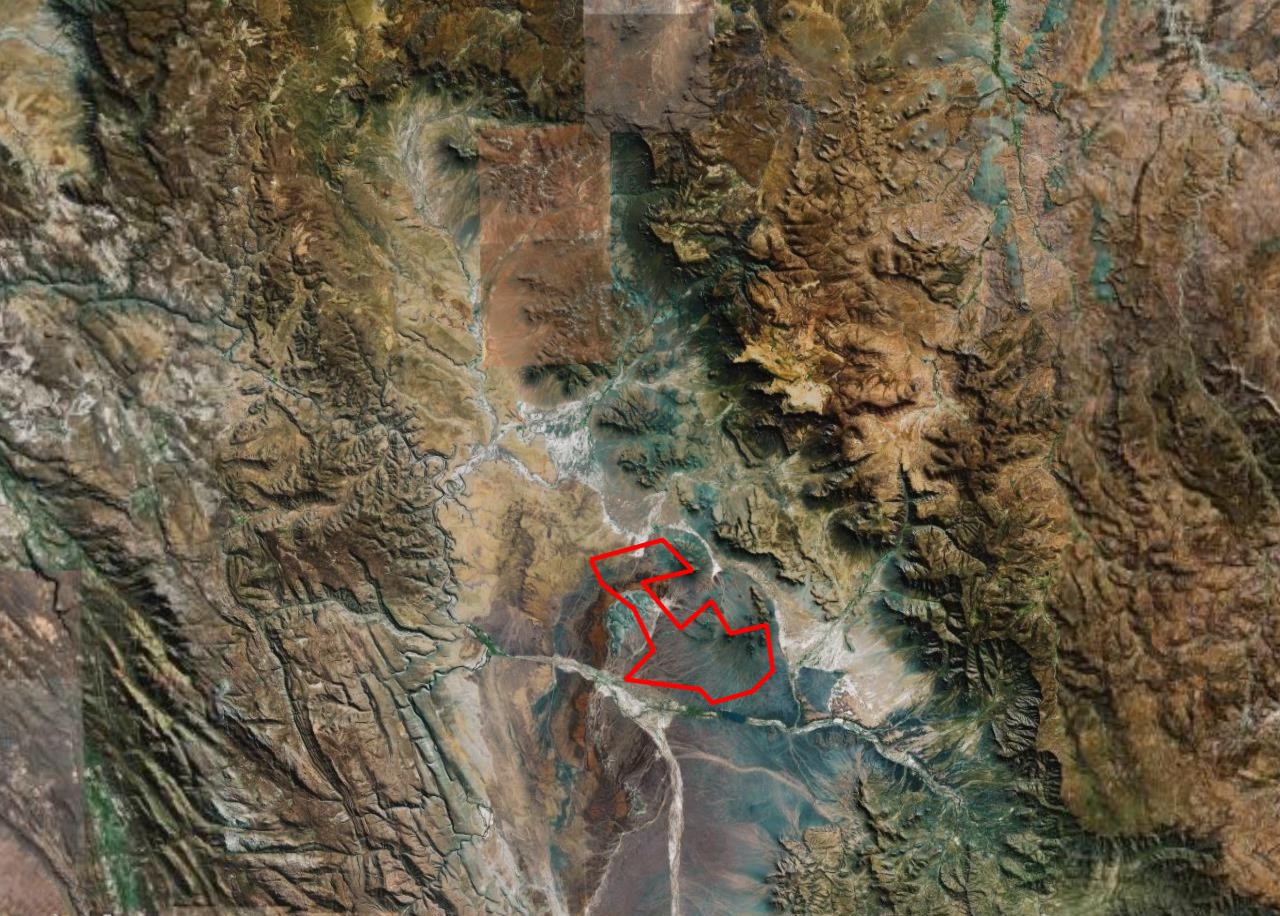
Satellite image of the park, with its boundaries highlighted

In 1998 Conrad Strauss sold 280 km^{2} of sheep farm to the South African National Parks. Tankwa's area has been increased from an initial 270 km^{2} to 1463 km^{2}.

== Climate ==
Some areas receive less than 100 mm of average annual precipitation, moisture-bearing clouds from the Atlantic Ocean being largely stopped by the Cederberg mountains.

Other low areas receive little more, as the Roodewerf station (co-ordinates: 32°14′27.9″S 20°05′44.5″E) with 180 mm of mean annual rainfall. In the hottest areas of the park, the mean maximum temperature in January is 38.9 °C, and in July the mean minimum temperature ranges from about 5 to 7 °C.

== Biodiversity ==
The park has started the reintroduction of game that used to be found naturally in the area. Research was done beforehand to ensure that introduced animals would survive on the overgrazed veld. The vegetation in the park falls within the Succulent Karoo biome and has been described as very sparse shrubland and dwarf shrubland. Several unique succulent genera occur here, such as Tanquana, Braunsia and Didymaotus. The park is home to a large variety of birds (188 species – 2015 figure), such as the black-headed canary, Ludwig's bustard, and the black-eared sparrow-lark. Peak birding season is August to October.

=== List of mammals ===
- Aardvark/Antbear (Orycteropus afer)
- Aardwolf (Proteles cristatus)
- Southern African wildcat (Felis lybica)
- Bat-eared fox (Otocyon megalotis)
- Black-backed jackal (Canis mesomelas)
- Cape fox (Vulpes chama)
- Cape golden mole (Chrysochloris asiatica)
- Cape hare (Lepus capensis)
- Caracal (Felix caracal)
- Chacma baboon (Papio cynocephalus ursinus)
- Four-striped grass mouse (Rhabdomys pumilio)
- Gerbil mouse (Malacothrix typica)
- Grey duiker (Sylvicapra grimmia)
- Grey rhebok (Palea capreolus)
- House mouse (Mus domesticus)
- Karoo bush rat (Otomys unisulcatis)
- Klipspringer (Oreotragus oreotragus)
- Kudu (Tragelaphus strepsiceros)
- Leopard (Panthera pardus)
- Meerkat (Suricata suricatta)
- Cape porcupine (Hystrix africaeaustralis)
- Ratel/honey badger (Mellivora capensis)
- Rock dassie/rock hyrax (Procavia capensis)
- Scrub hare (Lepus saxatilis)
- Small-spotted genet (Genetta genetta)
- Brown hyena (Parahyaena Brunnea)
- Springbok (Antidorcas marsupialis)
- Steenbok (Raphicerus campestris)
- Striped polecat/zorilla (Ictonyx striatus)
- Yellow mongoose (Cynictis penicillata)

=== List of birds ===
The park's bird list currently includes 187 bird species. Birds found in the park include:

- Acacia pied barbet
- African black swift
- African hoopoe
- Pied starling
- African pipit
- African red-eyed bulbul
- Common reed warbler
- African snipe
- Alpine swift
- Pied Avocet
- Barn owl
- Barn swallow
- Black-chested snake eagle
- Black-eared sparrow-lark
- Black harrier
- Black-headed canary
- Blacksmith lapwing
- Black stork
- Black-winged stilt
- Bokmakierie
- Booted eagle
- Brown-throated martin
- Burchell's courser
- Cape bulbul
- Cape bunting
- Cape clapper lark
- Cape crow
- Cape penduline tit
- Cape shoveler
- Cape siskin
- Cape sparrow
- Cape spurfowl
- Ring-necked dove
- Cape wagtail
- Cape weaver
- Capped wheatear
- Chestnut-vented warbler
- Southern fiscal
- Common quail
- Common waxbill
- Double-banded courser
- Dusky sunbird
- Egyptian goose
- European bee-eater
- Common starling
- Fairy flycatcher
- Familiar chat
- Greater flamingo
- Greater honeyguide
- Greater kestrel
- Greater striped swallow
- Grey-backed cisticola
- Grey-backed sparrow-lark
- Grey heron
- Grey tit
- Grey-winged francolin
- Hadada ibis
- Helmeted guineafowl
- House sparrow
- Jackal buzzard
- Karoo chat
- Karoo eremomela
- Karoo korhaan
- Karoo lark
- Karoo long-billed lark
- Karoo prinia
- Karoo scrub-robin
- Karoo thrush
- Kittlitz's plover
- Kori bustard
- Lanner falcon
- Large-billed lark
- Lark-like bunting
- Laughing dove
- Layard's warbler
- Lesser honeyguide
- Lesser kestrel
- Little swift
- Long-billed crombec
- Nicholson's pipit
- Ludwig's bustard
- Malachite sunbird
- Marsh sandpiper
- Martial eagle
- Mountain wheatear
- Namaqua dove
- Namaqua sandgrouse
- Namaqua warbler
- Nicholson's pipit
- Pale-winged starling
- Peregrine falcon
- Pied crow
- Pririt batis
- Red-billed teal
- Red-capped lark
- Red-faced mousebird
- Red-knobbed coot
- Rock kestrel
- Rock martin
- Rufous-eared warbler
- Secretarybird
- Sickle-winged chat
- South African shelduck
- Southern double-collared sunbird
- Southern grey-headed sparrow
- Southern masked weaver
- Pale chanting goshawk
- Southern red bishop
- Speckled pigeon
- Spike-heeled lark
- Spotted eagle owl
- Spotted thick-knee
- Steppe buzzard
- Three-banded plover
- Tractrac chat
- Verreaux's eagle
- Wattled starling
- White-backed mousebird
- White-necked raven
- White-rumped swift
- White-throated canary
- Willow warbler
- Yellow-bellied eremomela
- Yellow-billed kite
- Yellow canary
