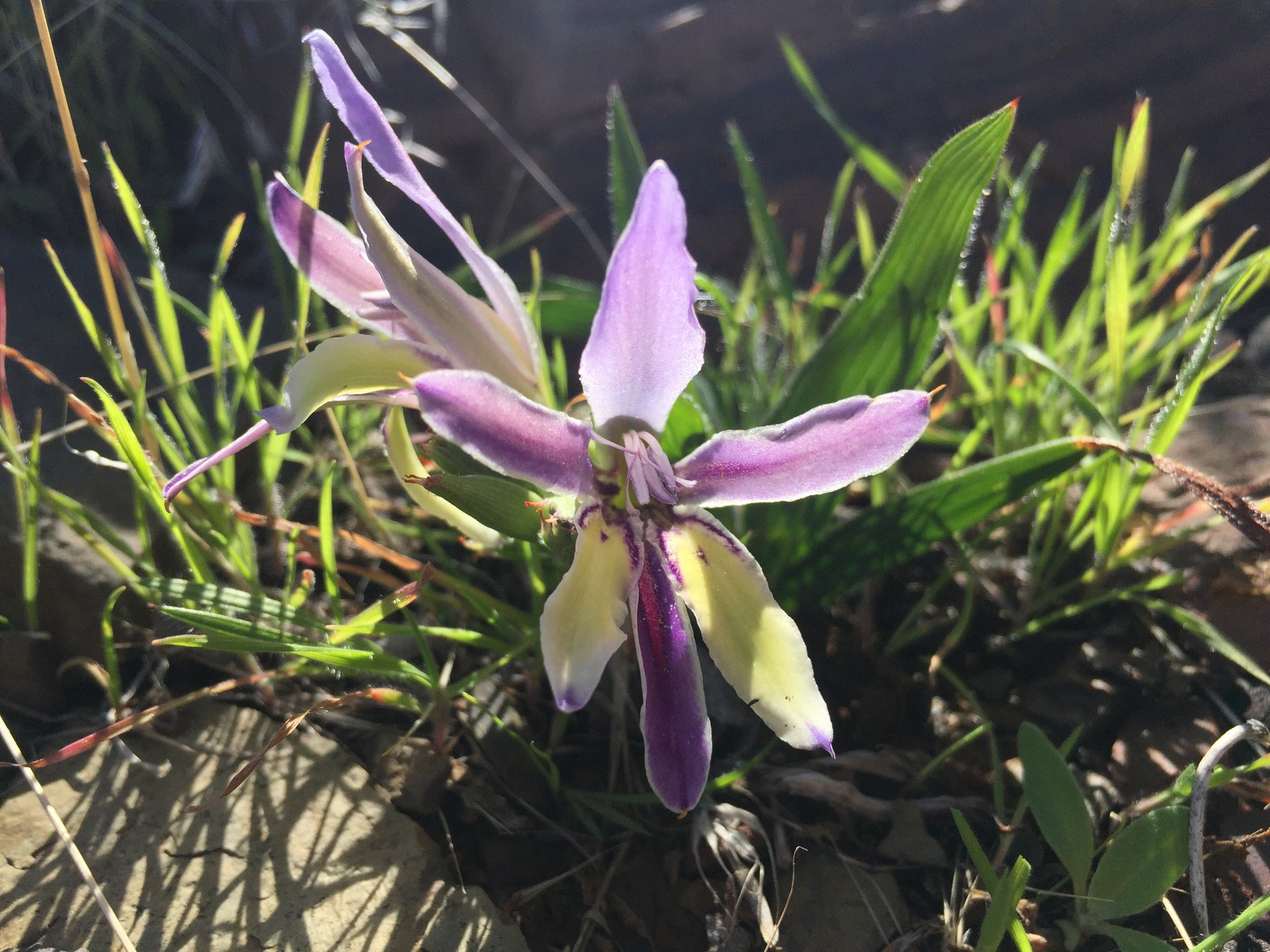

Scientific classification
- Kingdom: Plantae
- Clade: Tracheophytes
- Clade: Angiosperms
- Clade: Monocots
- Order: Asparagales
- Family: Iridaceae
- Genus: Babiana
- Species: B. tanquana

Binomial name
- Babiana tanquana J.C.Manning & Goldblatt

= Babiana tanquana =

Species of flowering plant

Babiana tanquana is a species of geophytic, perennial flowering plant in the family Iridaceae. The species is endemic to the Northern Cape and occurs in the Tankwa Karoo. It is part of the Succulent Karoo vegetation. There are four subpopulations. The plants found in the Tankwa Karoo National Park are protected by the park. The plant is considered rare.
