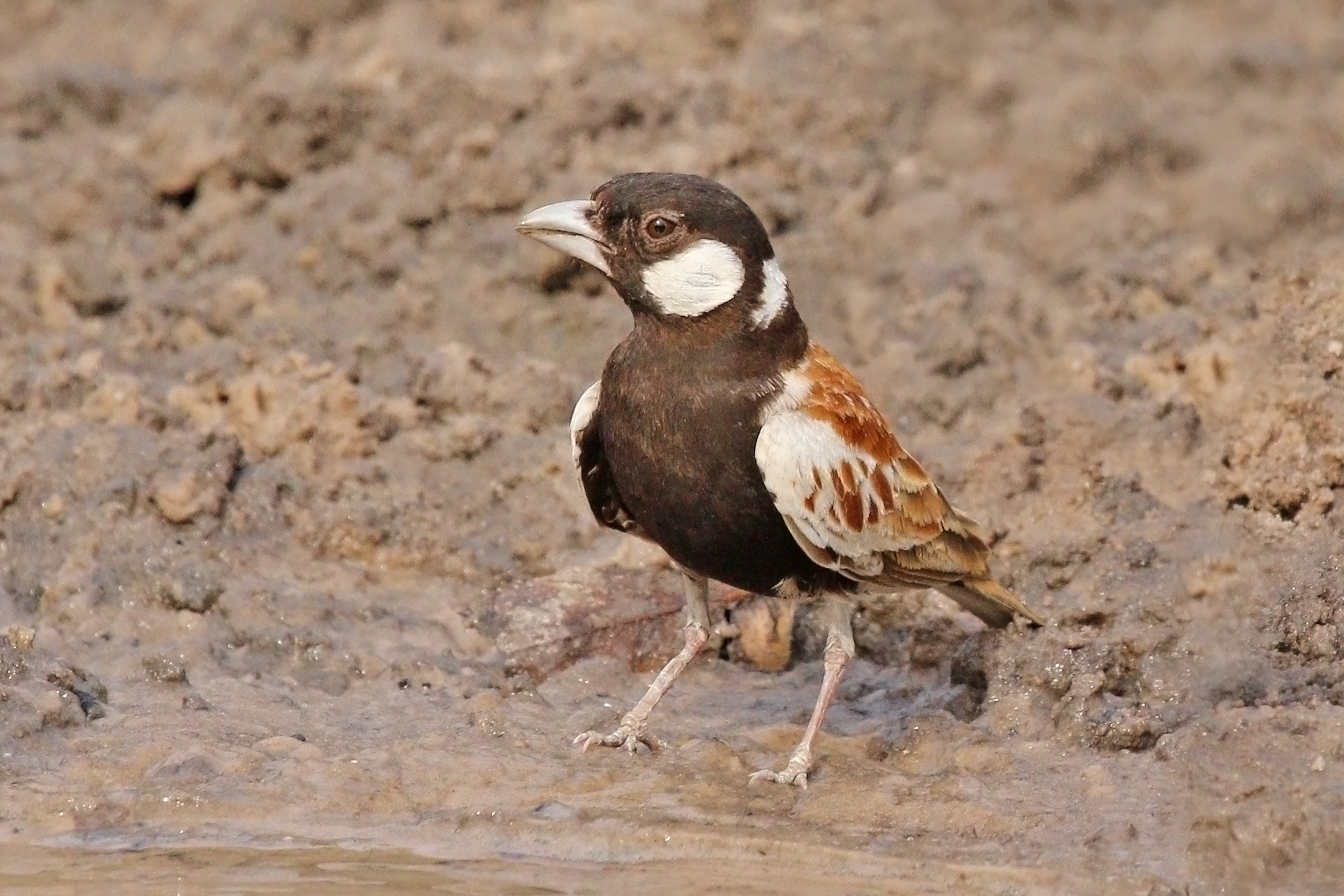
- male
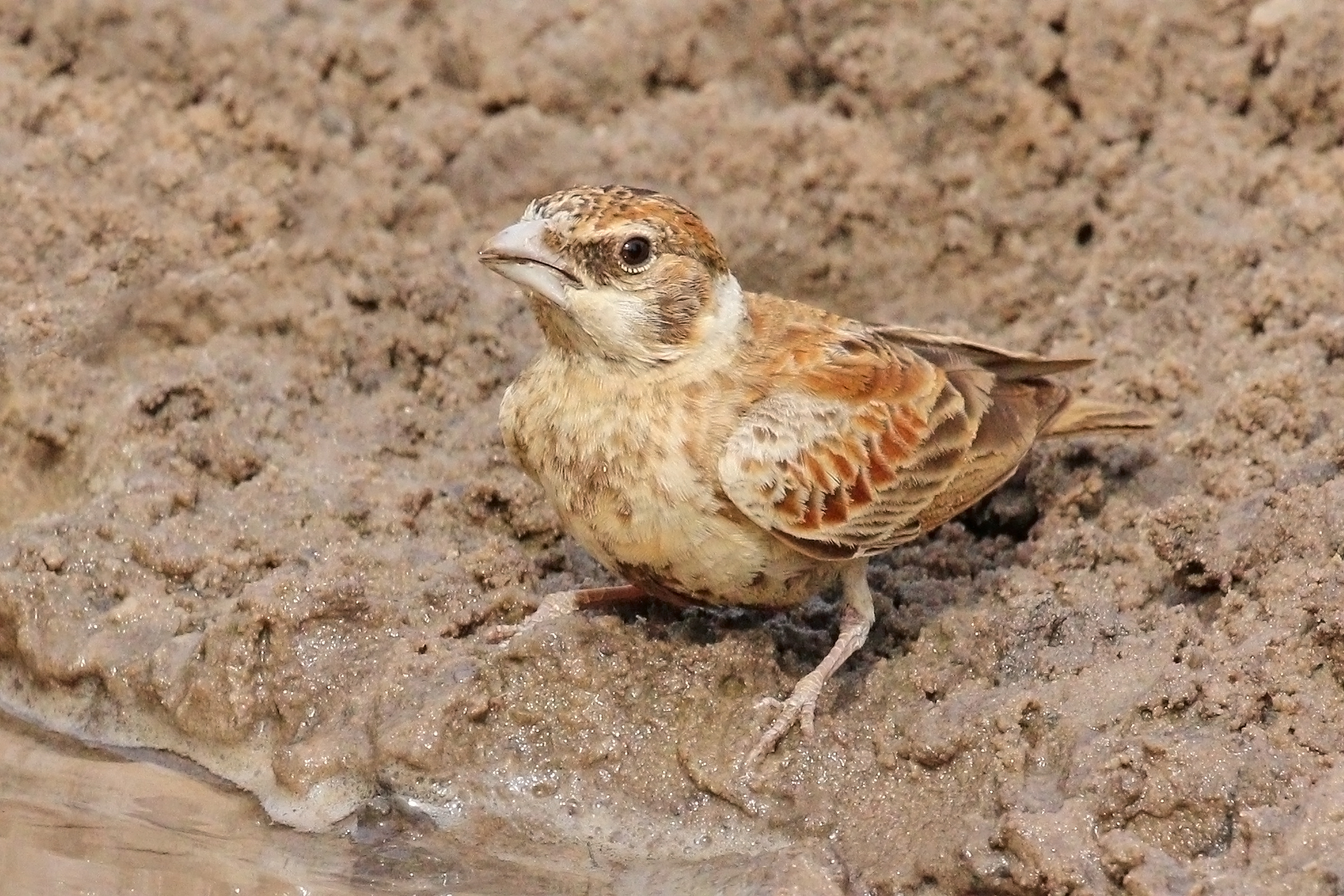
- female both in Senegal

Conservation status
- Least Concern (IUCN 3.1)

Scientific classification
- Kingdom: Animalia
- Phylum: Chordata
- Class: Aves
- Order: Passeriformes
- Family: Alaudidae
- Genus: Eremopterix
- Species: E. leucotis

Binomial name
- Eremopterix leucotis (Stanley, 1814)

Subspecies
- See text
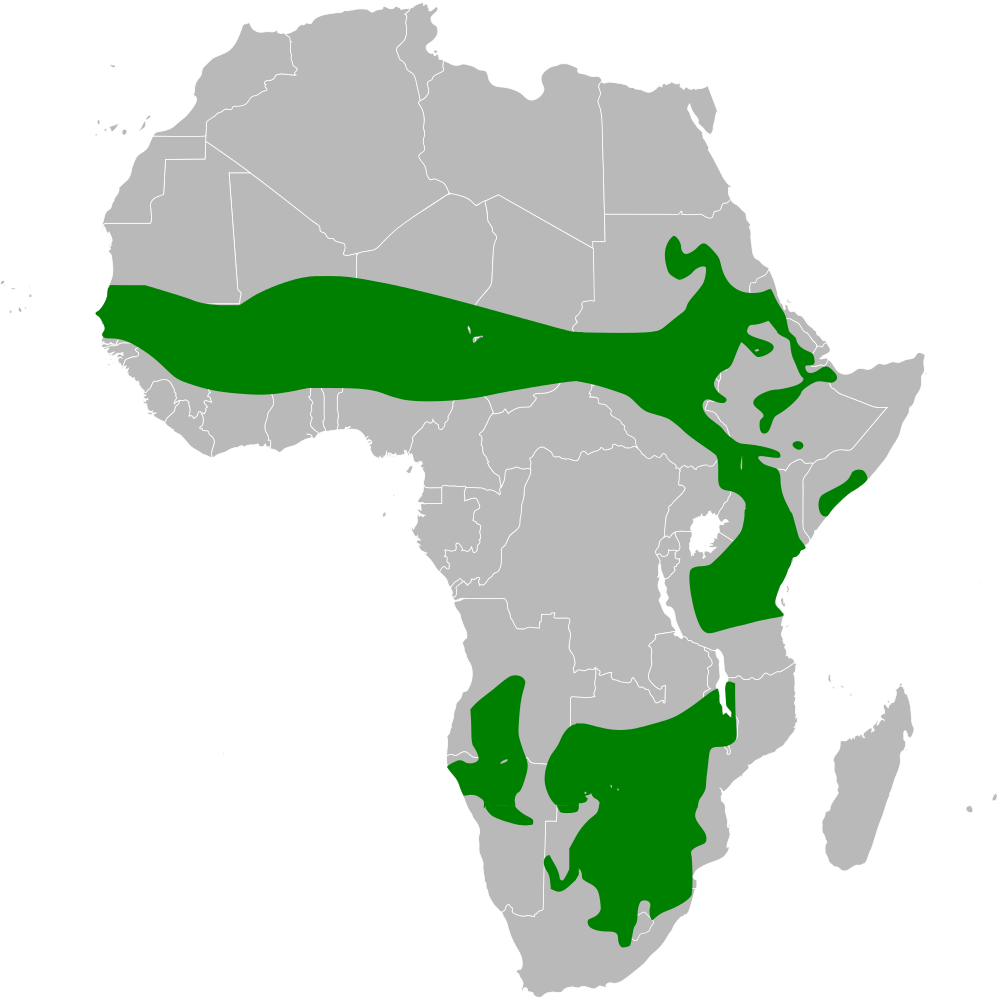

Synonyms
- Loxia leucotis

= Chestnut-backed sparrow-lark =

Species of bird

The chestnut-backed sparrow-lark (Eremopterix leucotis) is a passerine bird which is a resident breeder in Africa south of the Sahara Desert.

== Taxonomy and systematics ==
The chestnut-backed sparrow-lark was originally placed in the genus Loxia. It was later moved to the Lark family Alaudidae under the genus Eremopterix which includes all other sparrow-lark species. Alternate names for this species include: chestnut-backed finch-lark and white-cheeked sparrow-lark.

=== Subspecies ===
Five subspecies are recognized:

- Senegal chestnut-backed finch-lark (E. l. melanocephalus) - (Lichtenstein, MHK, 1823): Originally described as a separate species in the genus Alauda. Found from Senegal and Gambia to central Sudan
- E. l. leucotis - (Stanley, 1814): Found in southern and eastern Sudan, Eritrea, Ethiopia and northwestern Somalia
- East African chestnut-backed finch-lark (E. l. madaraszi) - (Reichenow, 1902): Found from southern Somalia and Kenya to northern Malawi and northern Mozambique
- E. l. hoeschi - White, CMN, 1959: Found from southern Angola and northern Namibia to western Zimbabwe
- South African chestnut-backed finch-lark (E. l. smithi) - (Bonaparte, 1850): Found from southern Zambia and southern Malawi to eastern South Africa

== Description ==
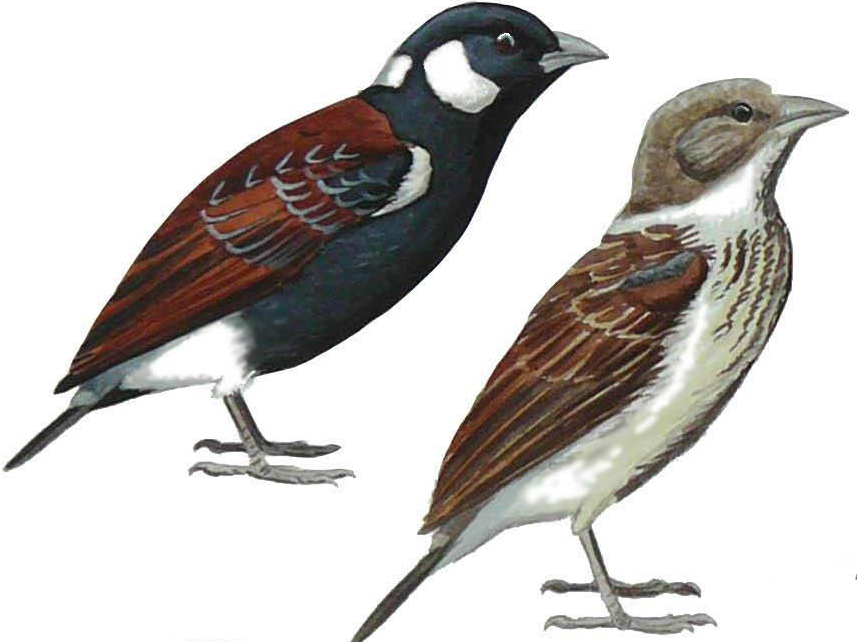
Illustration of a pair

This is a small lark at 11 cm. The male is striking, with solid black underparts and head apart from brilliant white patches on the nape and behind the eyes. The upperparts and wings are chestnut with some dark streaking. The thick bill is grey.

The female chestnut-backed sparrow-lark is a drabber bird with heavily streaked buff-white underparts and head, and a white nape collar. The upperparts are chestnut with mottling. Young birds are like the female.

== Distribution and habitat ==
This lark is a bird of open dry habitats such as open grassland and arid savanna, preferring recently burned turf, open fields, and gravel plains. They shuffle along in bare patches foraging for seeds and insects. They are both resident and nomadic, although movements are poorly understood. It is often found in mixed flocks with chestnut-headed sparrow-lark where their ranges overlap in NE Africa.

Geographic range:

•Eremopterix leucotis: South Sudan to Ethiopia, Eritrea, and northwestern Somalia

== Behaviour and ecology ==
It nests on the ground and lays one egg. Its food is insects and seeds.
