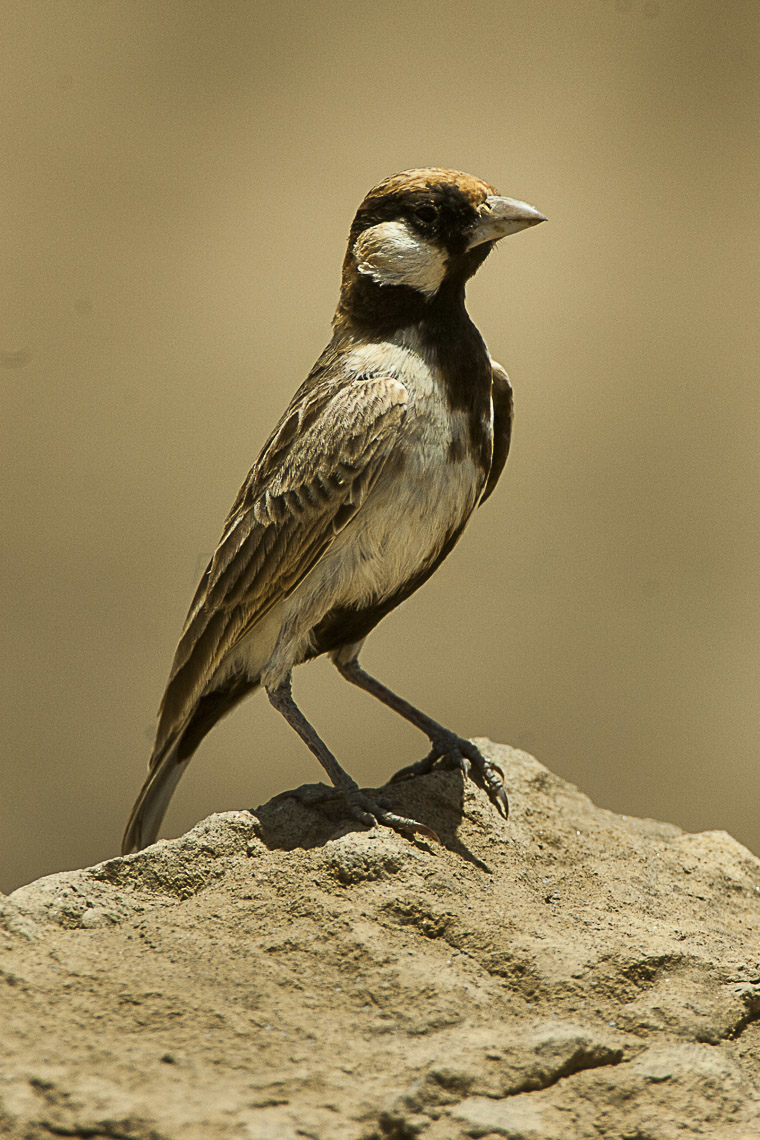

Conservation status
- Least Concern (IUCN 3.1)

Scientific classification
- Kingdom: Animalia
- Phylum: Chordata
- Class: Aves
- Order: Passeriformes
- Family: Alaudidae
- Genus: Eremopterix
- Species: E. leucopareia

Binomial name
- Eremopterix leucopareia (Fischer & Reichenow, 1884)
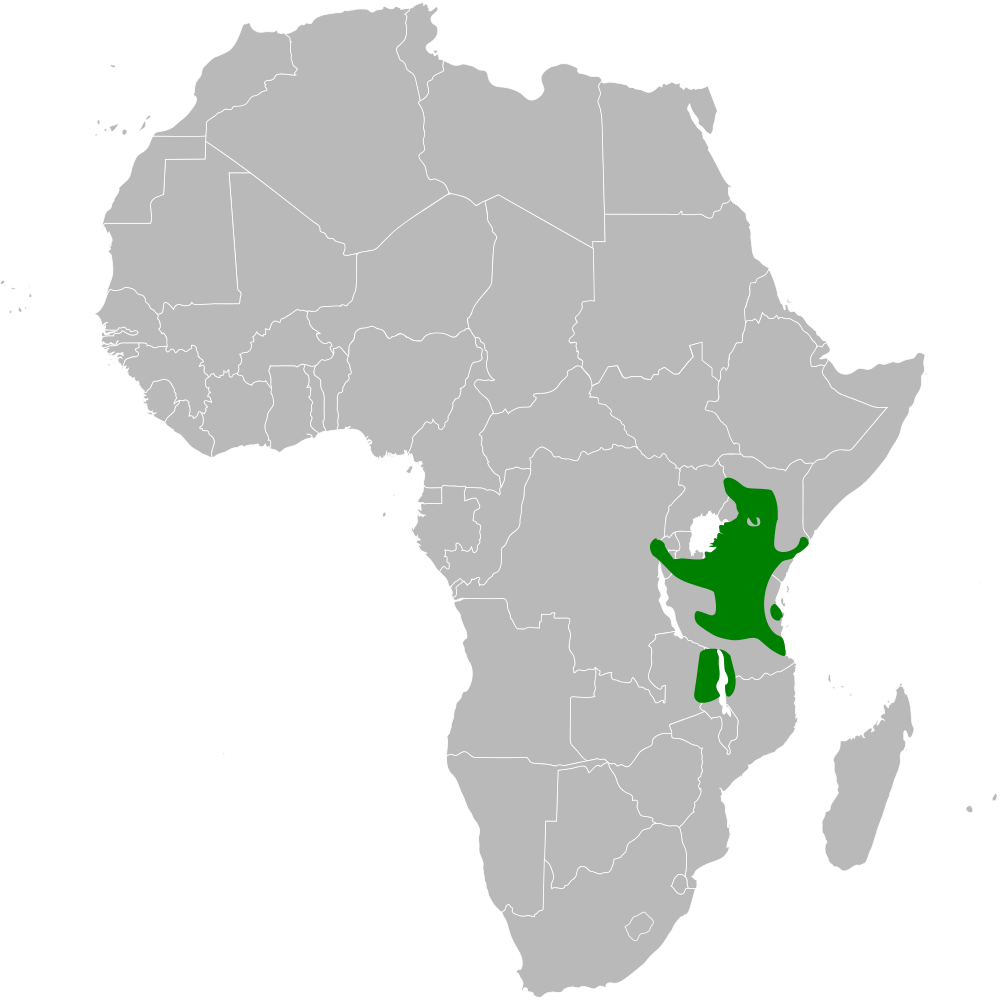

Synonyms
- Coraphites leucopareia

= Fischer's sparrow-lark =

Species of bird

Fischer's sparrow-lark (Eremopterix leucopareia) or Fischer's finch-lark is a species of passerine bird in the family Alaudidae. It is found from central Kenya to eastern Zambia, Malawi and north-western Mozambique. Its natural habitat is subtropical or tropical dry lowland grassland.

This inconspicuous dull-coloured bird somewhat resembles a finch. It can be distinguished from the similar chestnut-headed sparrow-lark by the absence of a white patch on the crown of its head. It is found on short grass plains where it congregates in large flocks except during the breeding season.

The common name of the bird commemorates the German explorer Gustav Fischer.
