= Didymaotus =

Conservation status
- Vulnerable (SANBI Red List)

Scientific classification
- Kingdom: Plantae
- Clade: Tracheophytes
- Clade: Angiosperms
- Clade: Eudicots
- Order: Caryophyllales
- Family: Aizoaceae
- Subfamily: Ruschioideae
- Tribe: Ruschieae
- Genus: Didymaotus; N.E.Br.
- Species: D. lapidiformis

Binomial name
- Didymaotus lapidiformis (Marloth) N.E.Br.

Genus of flowering succulent plants

Didymaotus is a monotypic genus of flowering plant belonging to the family Aizoaceae, containing the single species Didymaotus lapidiformis. The plant is also known by the names stone plant and beeskloutjie (Afrikaans for cow hoof). It occurs natively in the arid regions of Tanqua Karoo, near Ceres in the Western Cape. The generic name is taken from the Greek words didymos, meaning double, and aotus, meaning flower; the plant that bears two flowers. The specific epithet lapidiformis means stone-like, as it is not easily seen, blending in with its surroundings.

== Conservation ==
Didymaotus lapidiformis is considered vulnerable as a result of its localised and restricted habitat. Succulent collectors have over the years added to the species' further decline.
