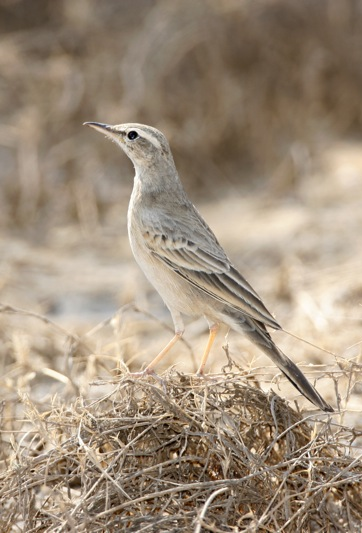
- Anthus similis decaptus

Conservation status
- Least Concern (IUCN 3.1)

Scientific classification
- Kingdom: Animalia
- Phylum: Chordata
- Class: Aves
- Order: Passeriformes
- Family: Motacillidae
- Genus: Anthus
- Species: A. similis

Binomial name
- Anthus similis (Jerdon, 1840)

Synonyms
- Agrodroma similis

= Long-billed pipit =

Species of bird

The long-billed pipit or brown rock pipit (Anthus similis) is a passerine bird which has a wide distribution. A number of subspecies have been created for the populations in Africa, through the Arabian Peninsula and South Asia. The systematics of this complex is yet to be clarified. Most birds are residents or short distance migrants.

== Taxonomy and systematics ==
This is a complex group with several similar looking birds with very disjunct distributions and the exact patterns of phylogeny are yet to be determined. Several subspecies that were formerly placed within this species have been raised to full species status.

The wood pipit (Anthus nyassae), an inhabitant of miombo woodland in south-central Africa, was formerly treated as a subspecies of this bird but is now usually regarded as a separate species. Some authorities also split Bannerman's pipit (Anthus (similis) bannermani), a bird of mountain grassland in West Africa. The Nicholson's pipit is a recently split non-migratory species from southern Africa.

The nominate race was described by Thomas C. Jerdon in 1840 from peninsular India. This form occurs along the Western Ghats and into the Nilgiris and Palni Hills. A darker race travancoriensis was described by Sidney Dillon Ripley in 1953 for the form possibly restricted south of the Palghat Gap. Subspecies decaptus described by Richard Meinertzhagen is found in Afghanistan, Pakistan and parts of northwestern India, while jerdoni is found along the Himalayan foothills east to Nepal. The population yamethini is somewhat disjunct and found in Myanmar. Several other races are described in the West Asian region and from Africa.

== Description ==
This is a medium-large pipit, 16–17.5 cm (6.3–6.9 in) long, but is an undistinguished looking species on the ground, mainly sandy grey above and whitish or pale buff below. It is very similar to the tawny pipit, but is slightly larger, has a longer tail and a longer dark bill.

The long-billed pipit's flight is strong and direct, and it gives a characteristic chupp call, similar to desert lark. Its song is like that of the tawny pipit, but slower and more varied, sri...churr...sri...churr…sri..churr. Like its relatives, long-billed pipit eats seeds and insects.

The long-billed pipit's breeding habitat is dry open slopes with rocks and low vegetation. The nest is on the ground, with 2-4 eggs being laid.

== Gallery ==
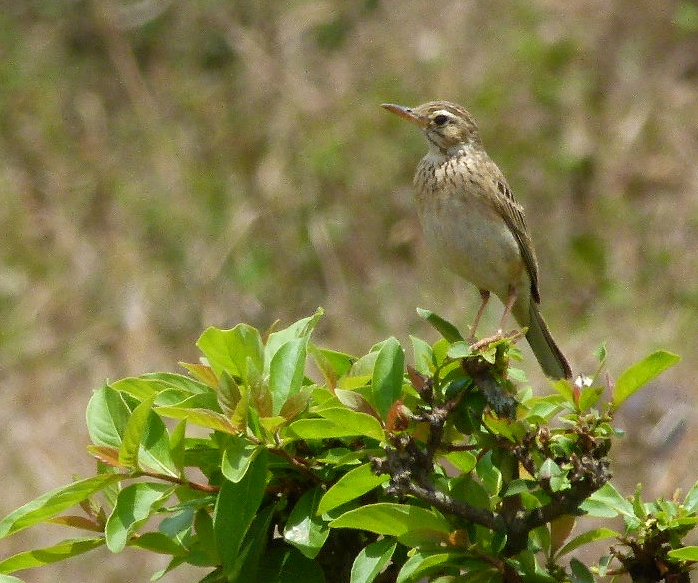
A. s. similis near Mysore, India

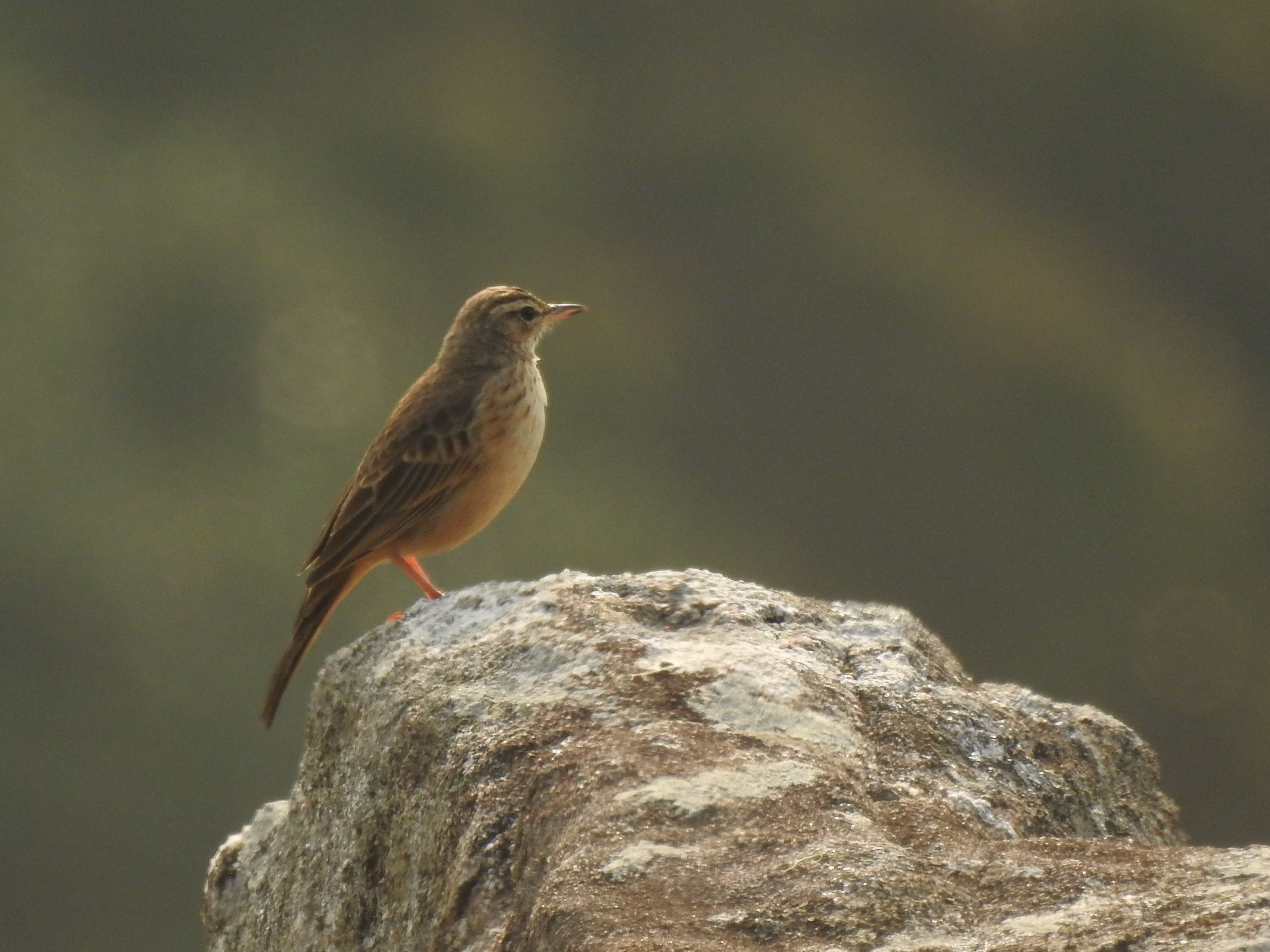
Long-billed Pipit, probably A. s. travancoriensis, in Kalakad - Mundanthurai Tiger Reserve, India

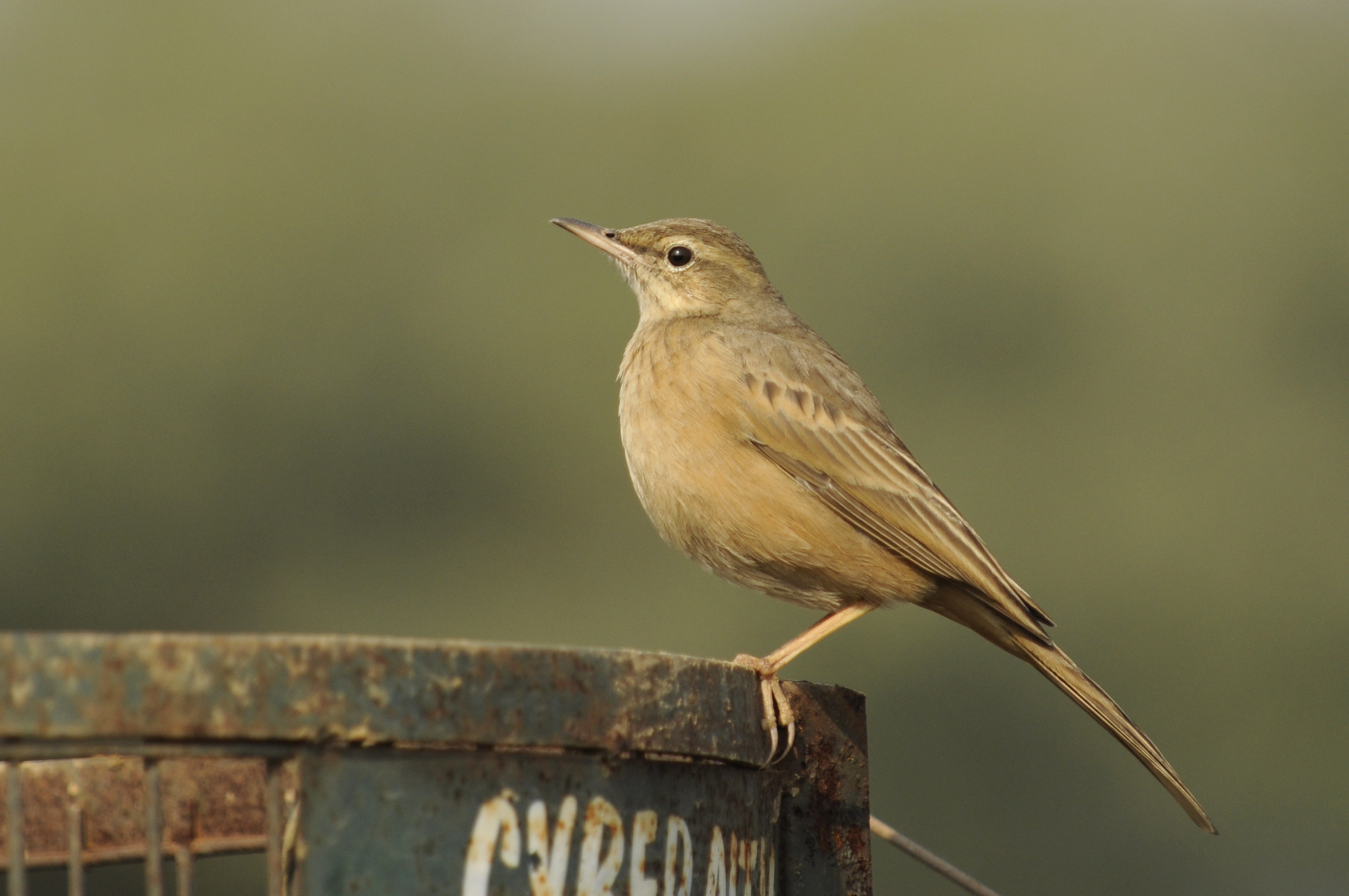
Long-billed Pipit in Aravalli Biodiversity Park, Gurgaon, India

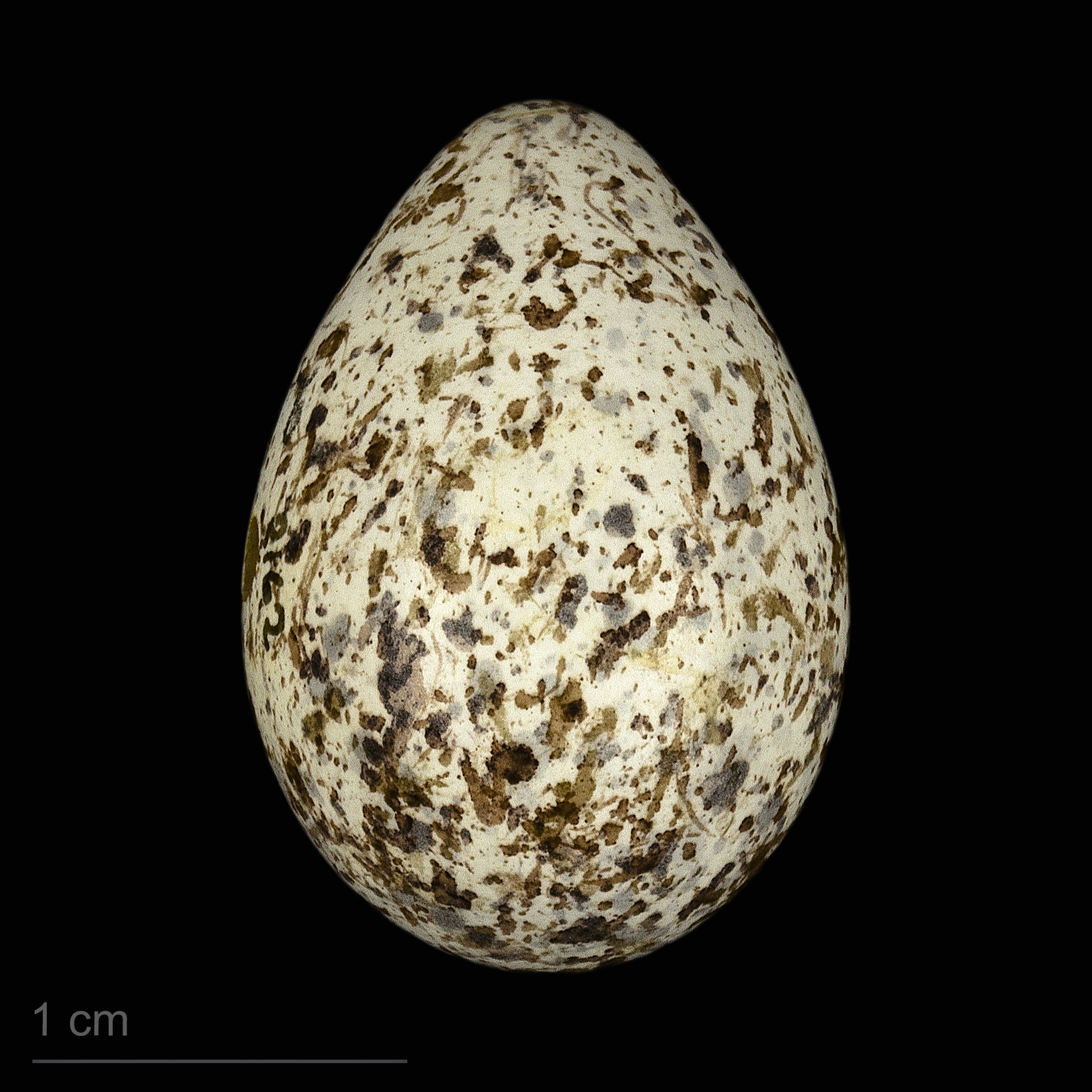
Anthus similis captus - MHNT
