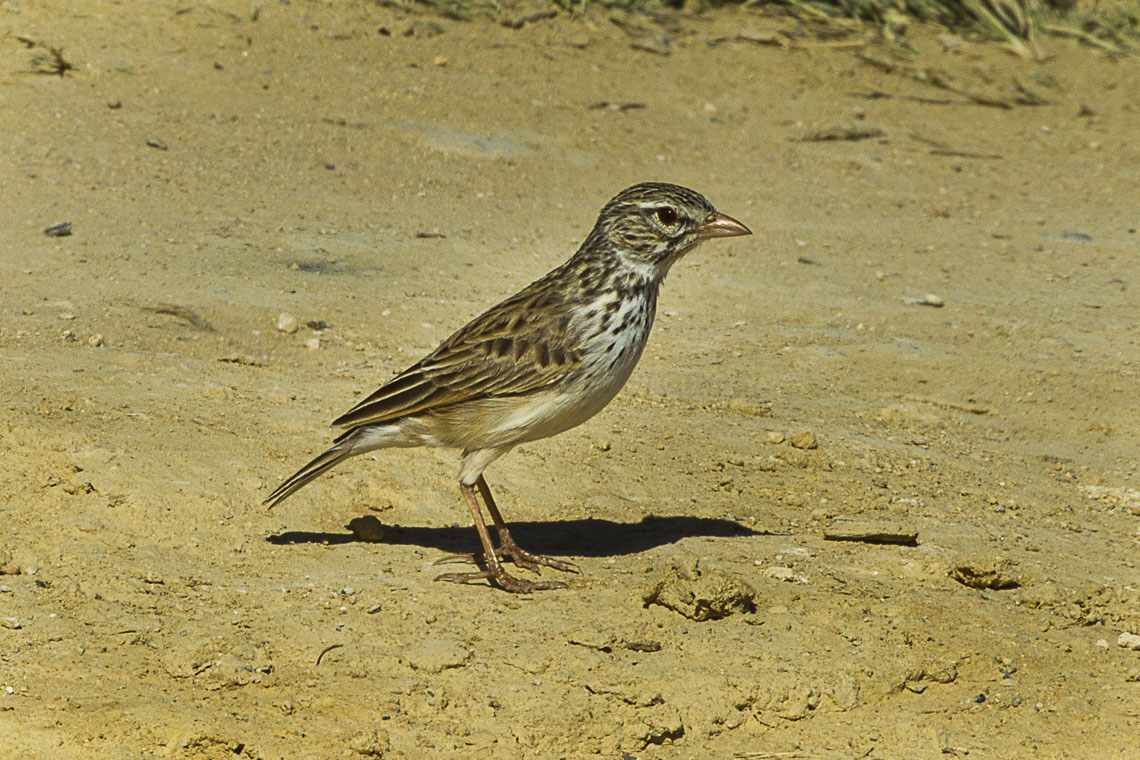

Conservation status
- Least Concern (IUCN 3.1)

Scientific classification
- Kingdom: Animalia
- Phylum: Chordata
- Class: Aves
- Order: Passeriformes
- Family: Alaudidae
- Genus: Eremopterix
- Species: E. hova

Binomial name
- Eremopterix hova (Hartlaub, 1860)
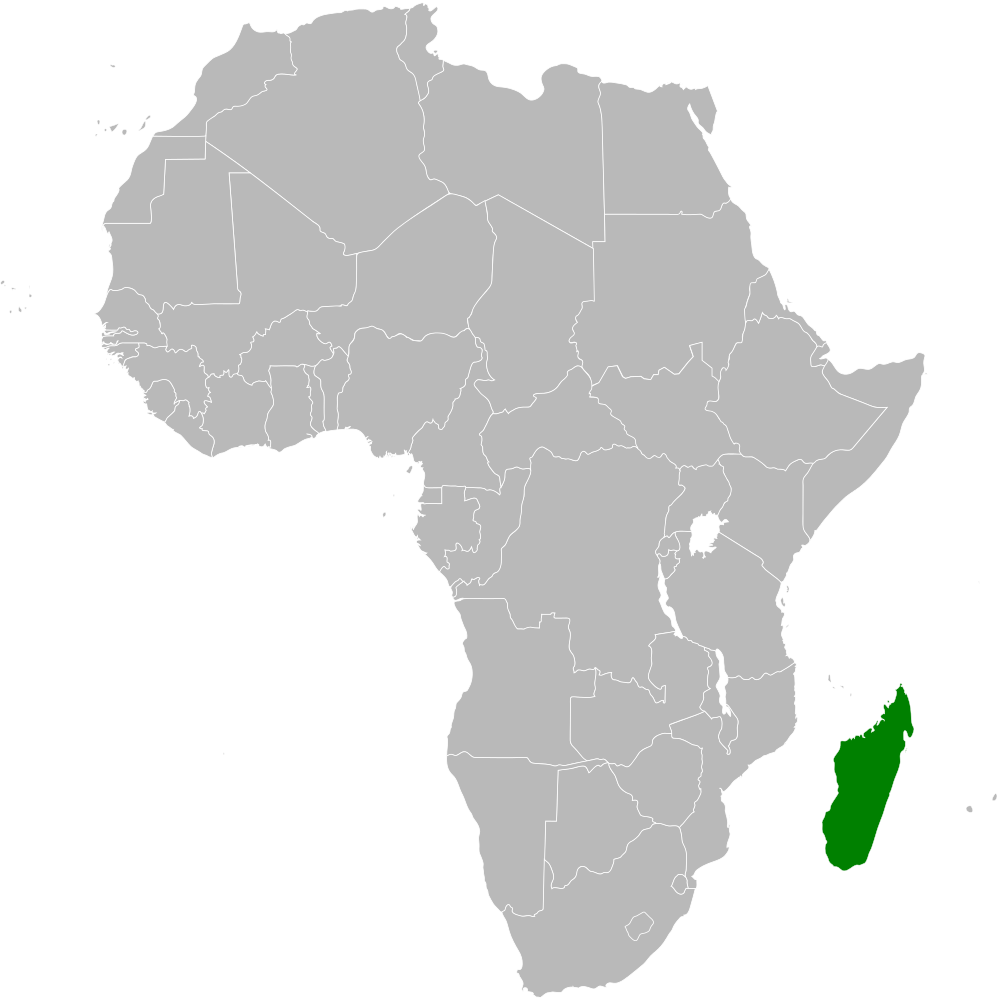

Synonyms
- Mirafra hova

= Madagascar lark =

Species of bird

The Madagascar lark (Eremopterix hova) is a species of lark in the family Alaudidae endemic to Madagascar.

== Taxonomy and systematics ==
The Madagascar lark was described by the German ornithologist Gustav Hartlaub in 1860, who placed it within the genus Mirafra. The specific name, hova, refers to the Hova, a caste in the precolonial Kingdom of Madagascar. It remained in the genus Mirafra until a 2013 study of the genetics of the family led by Per Alström unexpectedly found it was better placed in the genus Eremopterix, where it was moved to in 2014. The relationships of the Madagascar lark within this genus are not yet fully understood. Alternative names for the Madagascar lark include Hova lark, Madagascan bush lark, Madagascar singing bushlark, and Madagascar sparrow lark.

== Description ==
The Madagascar lark is very similar to many of the other Mirafra larks to which it was formerly thought to be related. It is a small lark, 13 cm (5.1 in) long, with greyish-brown upperparts streaked with darker brown, and whitish below with blackish streaks or spots on the upper breast; the wings are dark brown with paler fringes on the primary and secondary feathers often visible as a pale panel on the closed wing, as in most Mirafra species. Unlike the other Eremopterix larks with their boldly patterned males, but again like Mirafra larks, it does not show any sexual dimorphism. The legs are pinkish-brown, and the bill pinkish or buffy with a greyer tip; the bill is fairly slender, again like Mirafra larks, not the thick finch-like seed-eating bill of the other Eremopterix larks.

== Distribution and habitat ==
The range of the Madagascan lark is large, with an estimated global extent of occurrence of greater than 100,000 km^{2}. Its natural habitats encompass any open habitat in Madagascar, from dry savannah, dry shrubland to open woodland, and is found from sea-level to 2,500 m (8,200 ft) altitude. The species has probably benefited from forest clearances and the spread of agriculture, and can be found in rice paddies and near roads across the island.

== Behaviour ==
Little is known about the diet of the Madagascar lark. It feeds on the ground, sometimes digging in soil with its bill or taking prey off low branches and plants. The diet is composed on seeds, rice and insects, including grasshoppers. It will forage in small groups of up to six individuals when not actively breeding.

Madagascar larks will breed throughout the year, with males defending their territory with aerial displays. Nests are small bowls lined with grasses set into a depression next to a clump of grass or lump of wood. Two eggs are laid, and pairs will feign injury to distract predators away from the nest.

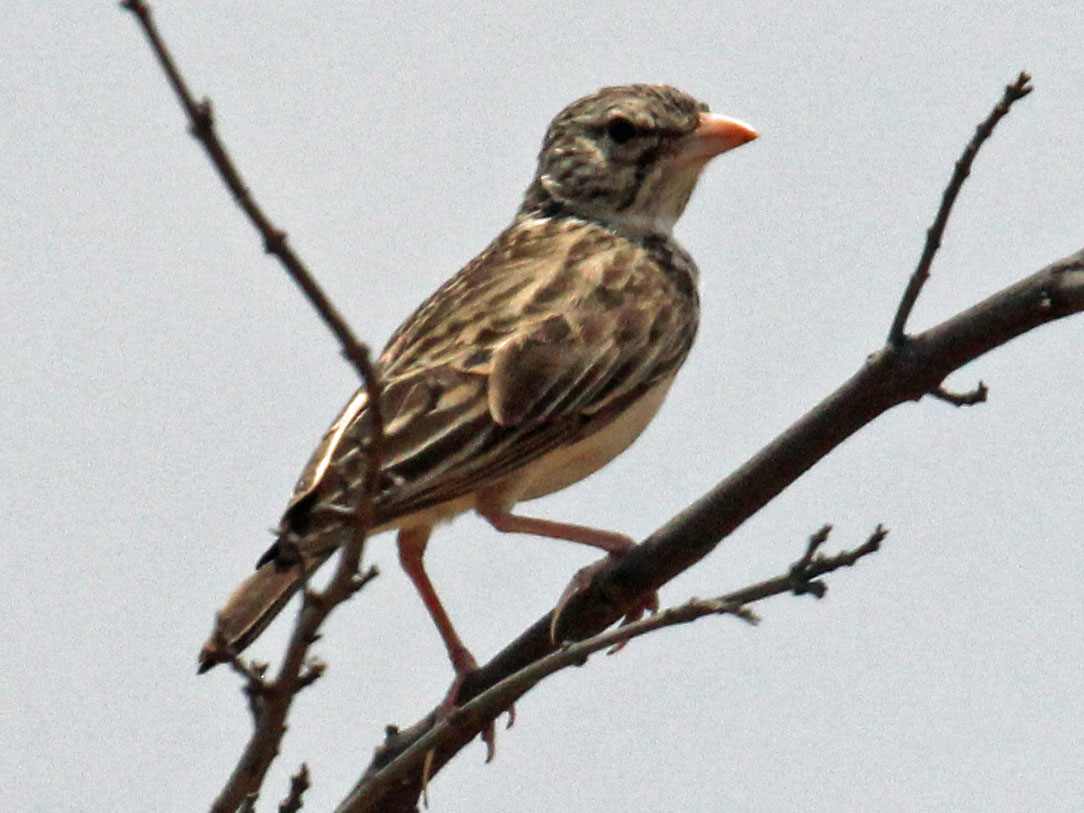
Near Morondava, Madagascar
