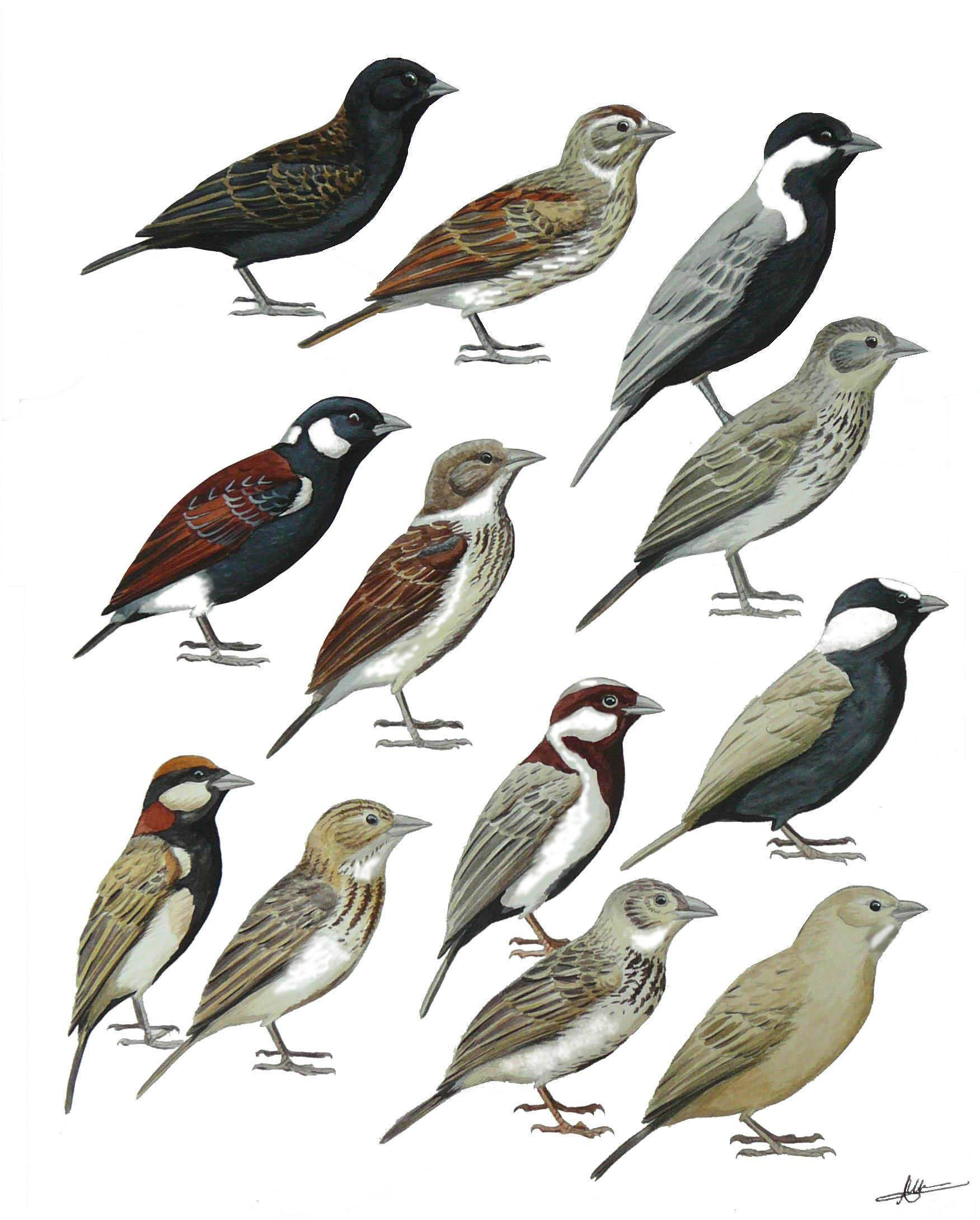
- Males and females of the six species on the African mainland

Scientific classification
- Kingdom: Animalia
- Phylum: Chordata
- Class: Aves
- Order: Passeriformes
- Family: Alaudidae
- Genus: Eremopterix; Kaup, 1836

Type species
- Fringilla otoleuca Temminck, 1824=Alauda melanocephala Lichtenstein, MHC, 1823

Species
- See text
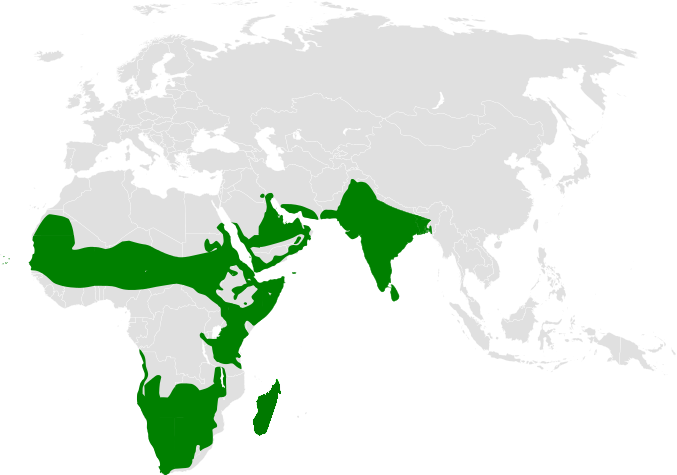
- Range of the genus

Synonyms
- Coraphites; Megalotis; Pyrrhulauda - A. Smith, 1839

= Eremopterix =

Genus of birds

Eremopterix is the genus of sparrow-larks, songbirds in the family Alaudidae. The sparrow-larks are found from Africa to the Indian subcontinent.

== Taxonomy ==
The genus Eremopterix was introduced in 1836 by the German naturalist Johann Jakob Kaup. The name combines the Ancient Greek ερημος/erēmos meaning "desert" with πτερυξ/pterux, πτερυγος/pterugos meaning "bird" or "winged creature". Kaup did not specify a type species but in 1907 the Russian ornithologist Valentin Bianchi designated the type as Fringilla otoleuca Temminck, 1824. This is a junior synonym of Alaudo melanocephala Lichtenstein, 1823, which is considered to be a subspecies of Eremopterix leucotis (Stanley, 1814), the chestnut-backed sparrow-lark.

The genus contains the following eight species:

Image	Scientific name	Common name	Distribution
	Eremopterix australis	Black-eared sparrow-lark	southern Botswana, Namibia, and South Africa
	Eremopterix hova	Madagascar lark	Madagascar.
	Eremopterix nigriceps	Black-crowned sparrow-lark	Mauritania through the Middle East to north-western India
	Eremopterix leucotis	Chestnut-backed sparrow-lark	Africa south of the Sahara Desert.
	Eremopterix griseus	Ashy-crowned sparrow-lark	South Asia
	Eremopterix signatus	Chestnut-headed sparrow-lark	eastern and north-eastern Africa
	Eremopterix verticalis	Grey-backed sparrow-lark	southern and south-central Africa
	Eremopterix leucopareia	Fischer's sparrow-lark	central Kenya to eastern Zambia, Malawi and north-western Mozambique

=== Former species ===
Formerly, some authorities also considered the following species (or subspecies) as species within the genus Eremopterix:

- Arabian Dunn's lark (as Pyrrhulauda eremodites)
