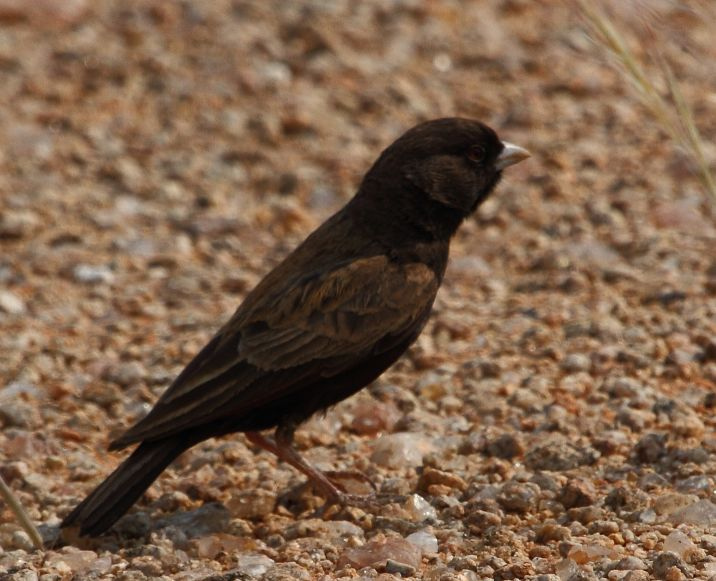
- A male in Bushmanland, South Africa

Conservation status
- Least Concern (IUCN 3.1)

Scientific classification
- Kingdom: Animalia
- Phylum: Chordata
- Class: Aves
- Order: Passeriformes
- Family: Alaudidae
- Genus: Eremopterix
- Species: E. australis

Binomial name
- Eremopterix australis (Smith, 1836)
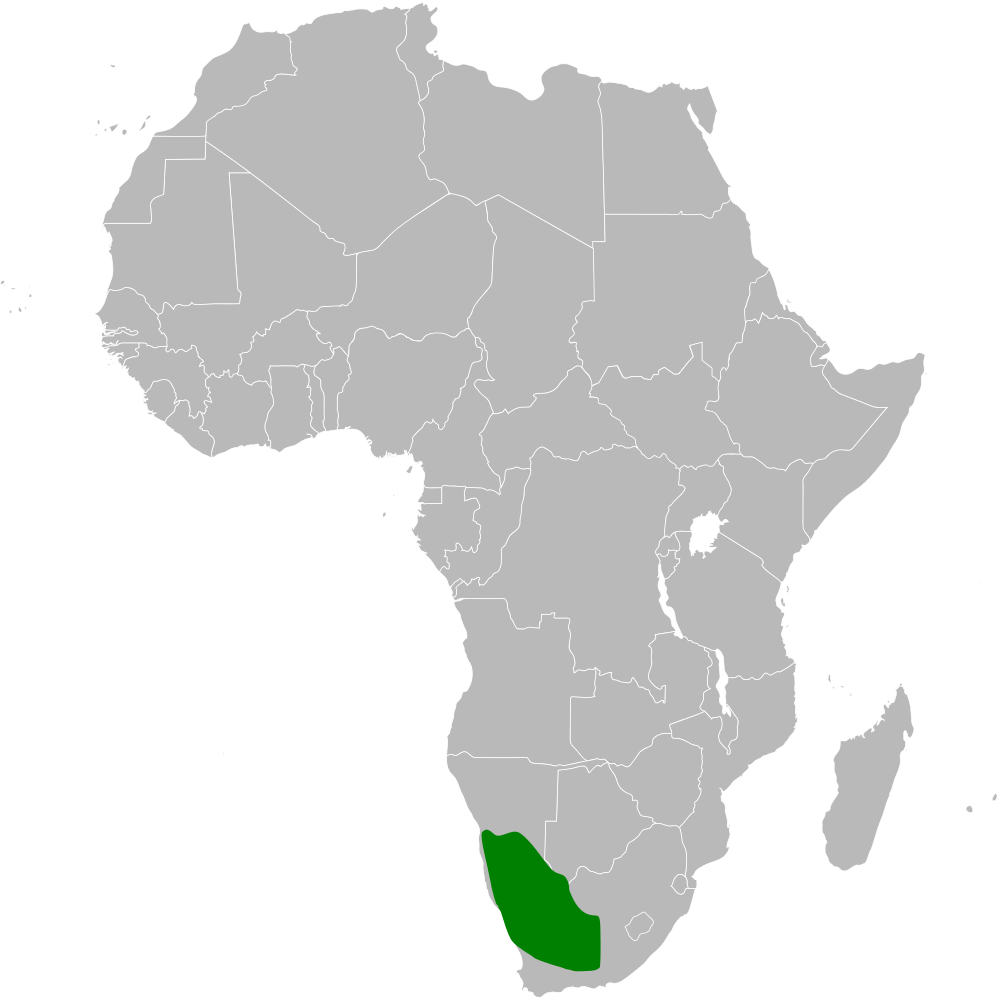

Synonyms
- Megalotis australis

= Black-eared sparrow-lark =

Species of bird

The black-eared sparrow-lark (Eremopterix australis) or black-eared finch lark is a species of lark in the family Alaudidae. It is found in southern Botswana, Namibia, and South Africa. Its natural habitats are subtropical or tropical dry shrubland and subtropical or tropical dry lowland grassland.

== Taxonomy and systematics ==
Sometimes the name grey-backed sparrow-lark is used to describe this species, although more commonly it refers to a separate species (Eremopterix verticalis).
