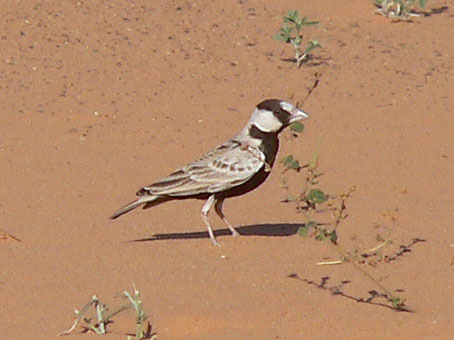
- Male
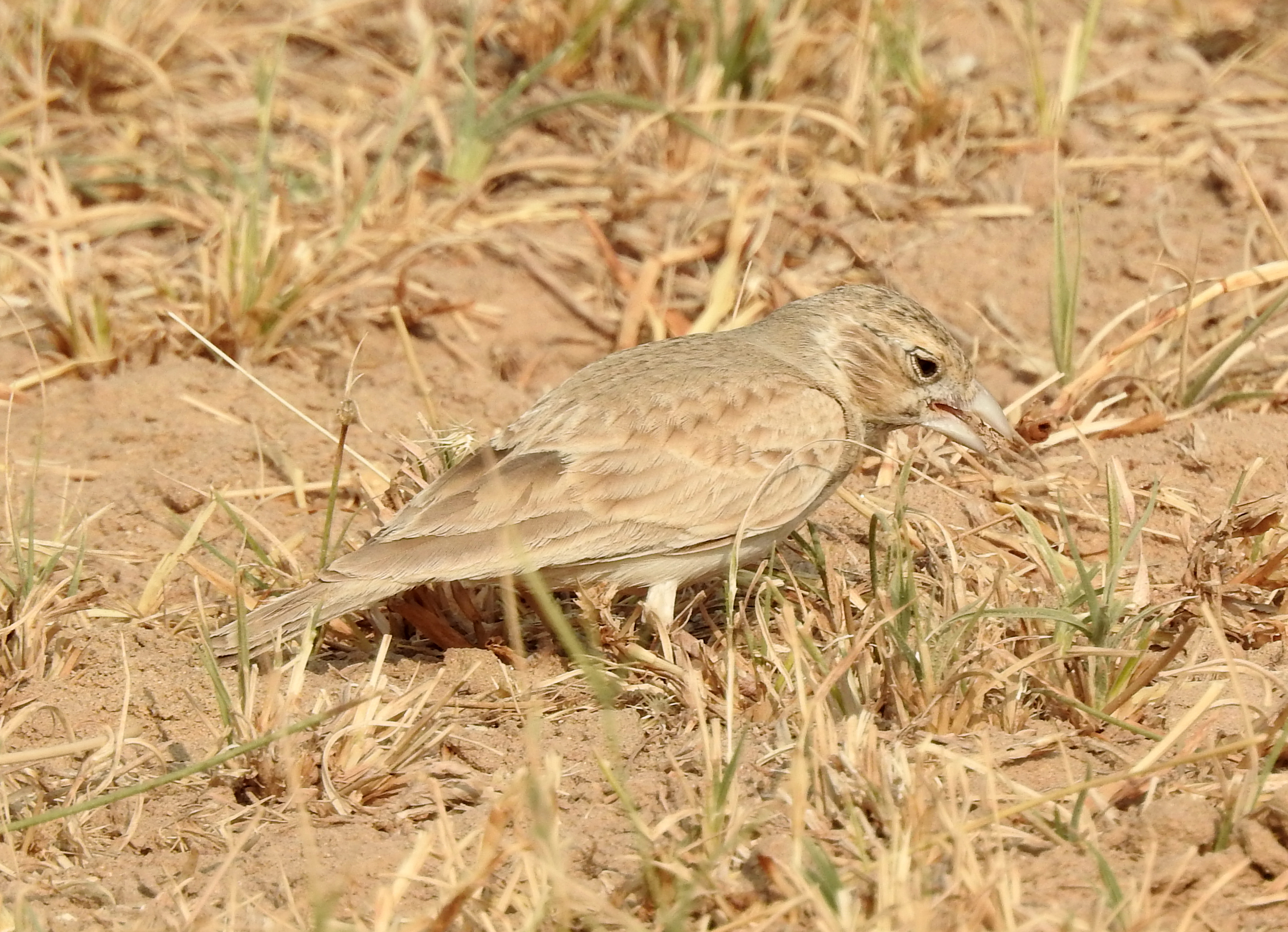
- Female

Conservation status
- Least Concern (IUCN 3.1)

Scientific classification
- Kingdom: Animalia
- Phylum: Chordata
- Class: Aves
- Order: Passeriformes
- Family: Alaudidae
- Genus: Eremopterix
- Species: E. nigriceps

Binomial name
- Eremopterix nigriceps (Gould, 1839)

Subspecies
- See text
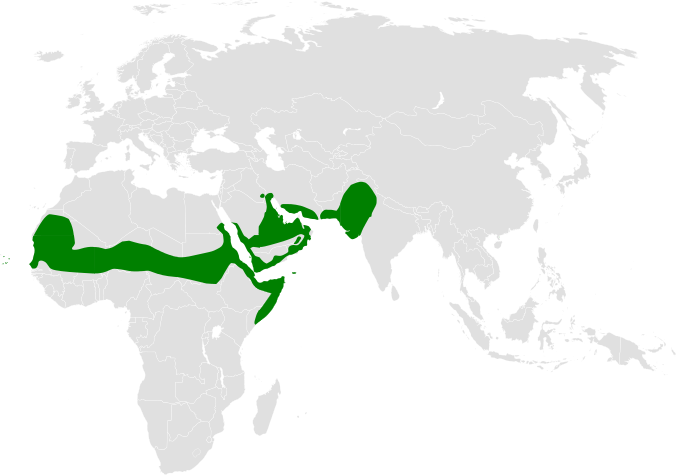

Synonyms
- Pyrrhalauda nigriceps

= Black-crowned sparrow-lark =

Species of bird

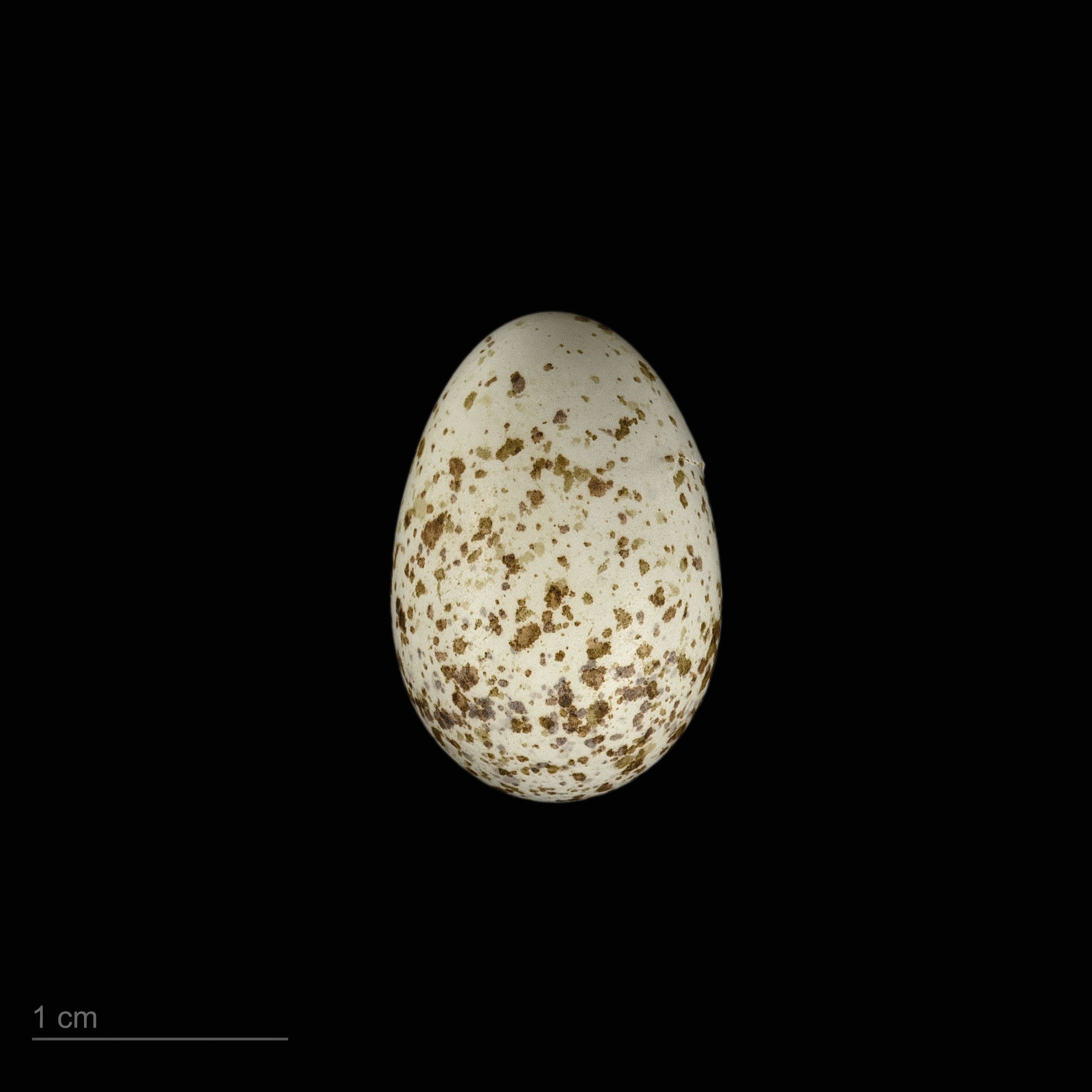
Eremopterix nigriceps nigriceps, MHNT

The black-crowned sparrow-lark (Eremopterix nigriceps) is a species of lark in the family Alaudidae. It is found across northern Africa from Mauritania through the Middle East to north-western India. Its natural habitat is dry savanna.

== Taxonomy and systematics ==
The black-crowned sparrow-lark is also known as the black-crowned finch lark, white-crested finch-lark, white-crested sparrow-lark, white-fronted finch-lark and white-fronted sparrow-lark.

=== Subspecies ===
Three subspecies are recognized:

- E. n. nigriceps – (Gould, 1839): Found on Cape Verde Islands
- Saharan black-crowned sparrow-lark (E. n. albifrons) – (Sundevall, 1850): Found from Mauritania and Senegal to Sudan
- Eastern black-crowned sparrow-lark (E. n. melanauchen) – (Cabanis, 1851): Found from eastern Sudan to Somalia, Arabia, Socotra Island, southern Iraq, Iran and Pakistan

== Description ==
The adult males has a bold pied head pattern with a mainly blackhead with contrasting white forehead and white cheek patches. The upperparts are pale greyish brown with black underparts and underwings which contrast with a white patch at the sides of the breast. The tail is blackish with buff edges and grey central feathers, The bill is horn coloured. The females are very different being pale sandy brown on the upperparts with faint streaking on the crown and whitish patches around the eye and on the sides of the neck. The female's underparts are whitish with a pale cinnamon breast band and black underwing coverts, The juveniles are similar to the fameals but the feathers on the head are tipped with buff. The bird is 11.5–12.5 cm in length from bill to tail. The male's song is quite variable, typically consisting of a short series of simple, sweet notes, either sung in the flight display or from a low vantage point in a bush or on a rock.

== Distribution and habitat ==
The black-crowned sparrow-lark occurs across North Africa, from the Cape Verde archipelago east through the Sahel of northern Africa, through the Arabian Peninsula and into Pakistan and India.

The black-crowned sparrow-lark occurs in arid and semi-arid plains with scattered low vegetation and tussocks of grass, preferring sandy areas over areas with rocky soil, it has also been observed around salt pans.

== Behaviour and ecology ==
In the heat of midday, these birds reduce water loss by staying in the shade, and it has even been recorded sheltering within the burrows of large lizards. It will also attempt to regulate its body temperature by flying with the legs dangling below it to expose the bare skin, or by perching facing into the wind, with the wings drooped to increase its surface area which is exposed to the moving air. Outside of the breeding season, they may form flocks of up to 50 birds which forage together but large flocks of several thousand have been recorded.

=== Breeding ===
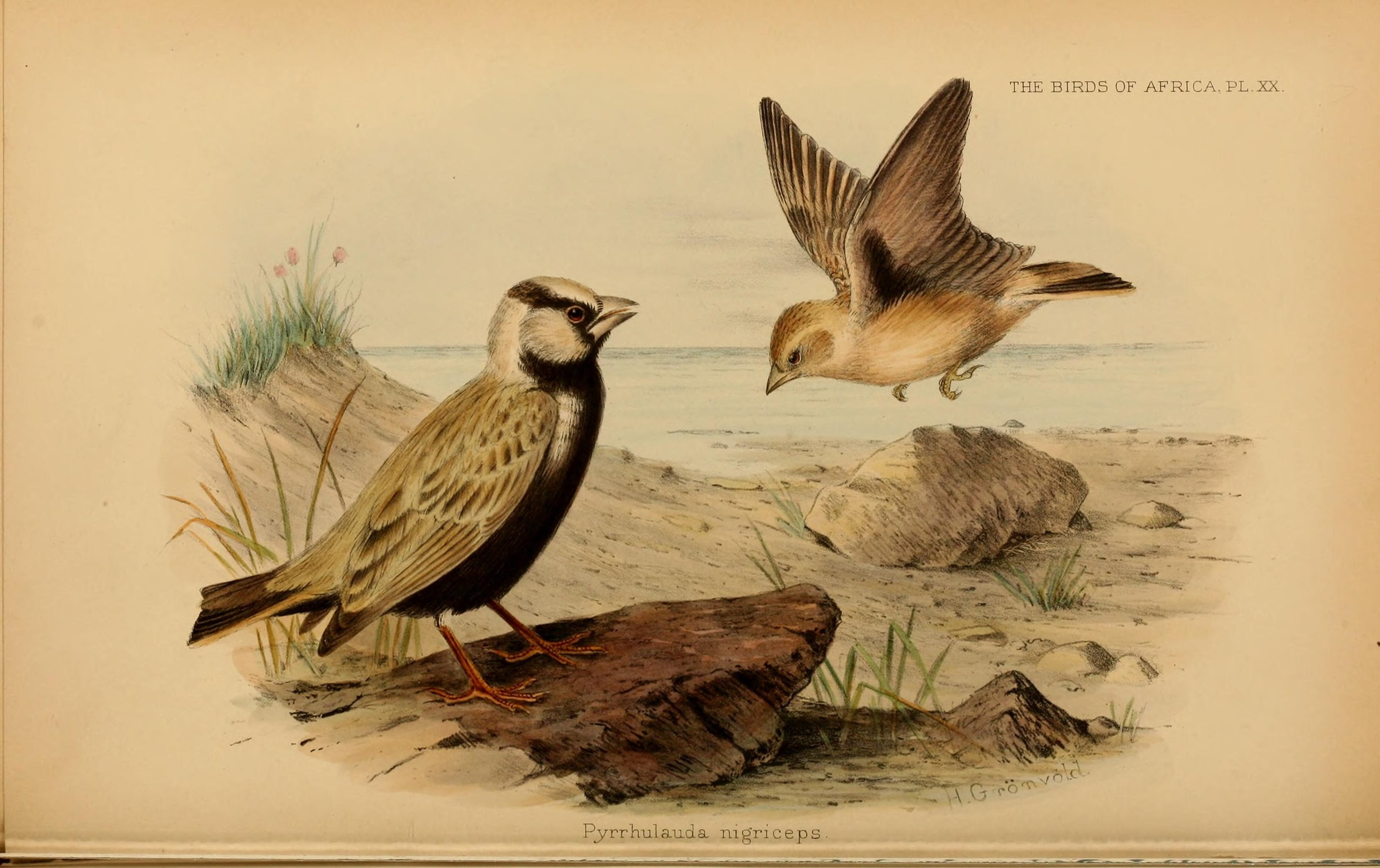
Female and male of the species.

The male black-crowned sparrow-lark performs aerial displays over the breeding territory, in which he climbs steeply up from the ground prior to circling and calling, before falling in a series of shallow dives. Sometimes both male and female will display together, the male pursuing the female in a twisting, low flight. They normally breed during the summer months, and breeding is often triggered by rain and so can take place at almost any time when conditions are favourable. The nestis a shallow depression which is lined with plant and other material, with the rim often marked out with small stones or small clods of earth. The nest is usually situated beneath a shrub or a grass tuft so that some shade is provided. Both sexes incubate the clutch of 2 to 3 eggs, for around 11 to 12 days. The chicks start to leave the nest some time before they are able to fly for short periods at around six days old and typically leave it altogether at around eight days old. Soon after the chicks leave the nest, the chicks separate and each adult becomes solely responsible for one chick, this may be behaviour which reduces the risk of predation. If there are more than two chicks the other chicks often do not survive. The chicks fledge properly at around 21 or 22 days old and reach sexual maturity at about a year old.

=== Food and feeding ===
The black-crowned sparrow-lark is a seed eater, but will also feed on insects and other invertebrates. The young are fed predominantly on a diet of insects while in the nest. In such a hot environment the birds do most of their foraging in the early morning and evening. Food is normally found on the ground, although flying insects are sometimes caught by the bird hawking them in the air.

== Status ==
The species has a broad range and a large, increasing population, leading to its classification as "Least Concern" by the International Union for Conservation of Nature (IUCN).

Observations indicate that the population is not only growing but also expanding its distribution southward.
