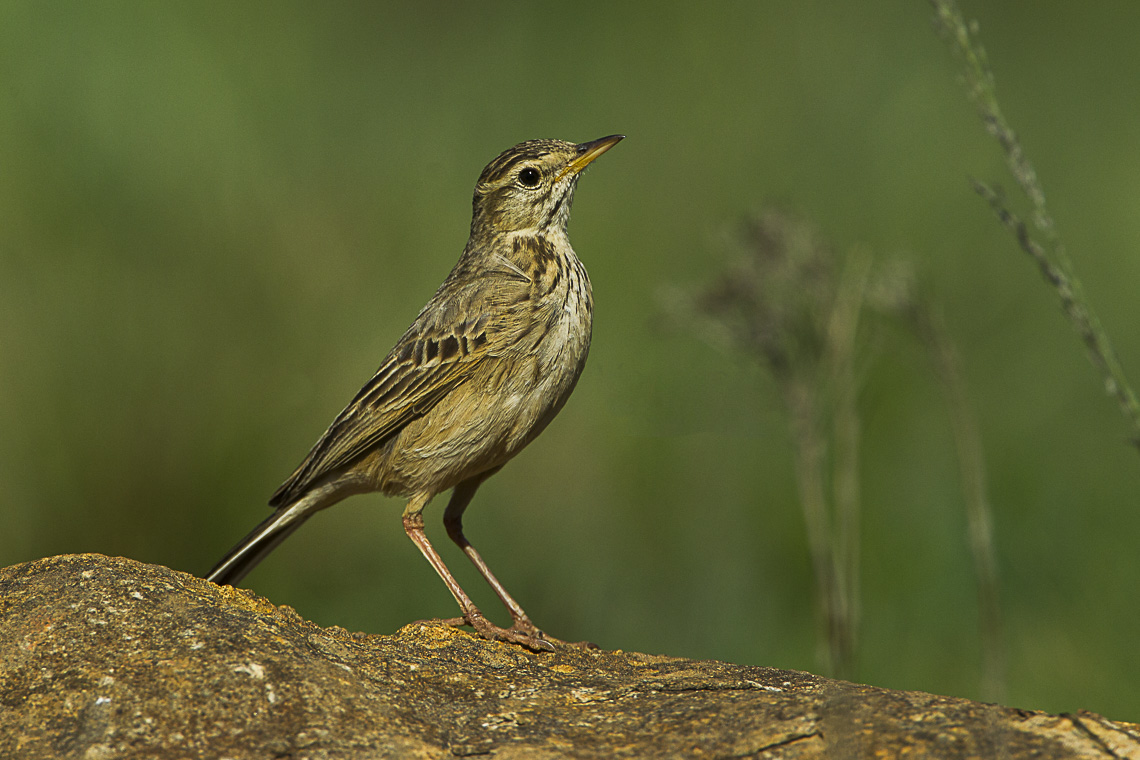

Scientific classification
- Domain: Eukaryota
- Kingdom: Animalia
- Phylum: Chordata
- Class: Aves
- Order: Passeriformes
- Family: Motacillidae
- Genus: Anthus
- Species: A. nicholsoni

Binomial name
- Anthus nicholsoni Sharpe, 1884

= Nicholson's pipit =

Species of bird

Nicholson's pipit (Anthus nicholsoni) is a small passerine bird belonging to the pipit genus Anthus in the family Motacillidae. It was formerly included with the long-billed pipit (Anthus similis) but is now frequently treated as a separate species. It is a bird found in southern Africa. They are non-migratory.
