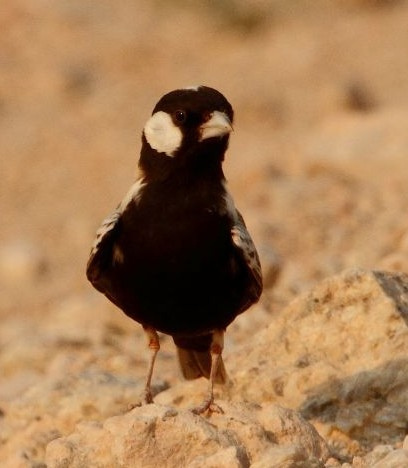
- Male in Northern Cape, South Africa

Conservation status
- Least Concern (IUCN 3.1)

Scientific classification
- Kingdom: Animalia
- Phylum: Chordata
- Class: Aves
- Order: Passeriformes
- Family: Alaudidae
- Genus: Eremopterix
- Species: E. verticalis

Binomial name
- Eremopterix verticalis (Smith, 1836)

Subspecies
- See text
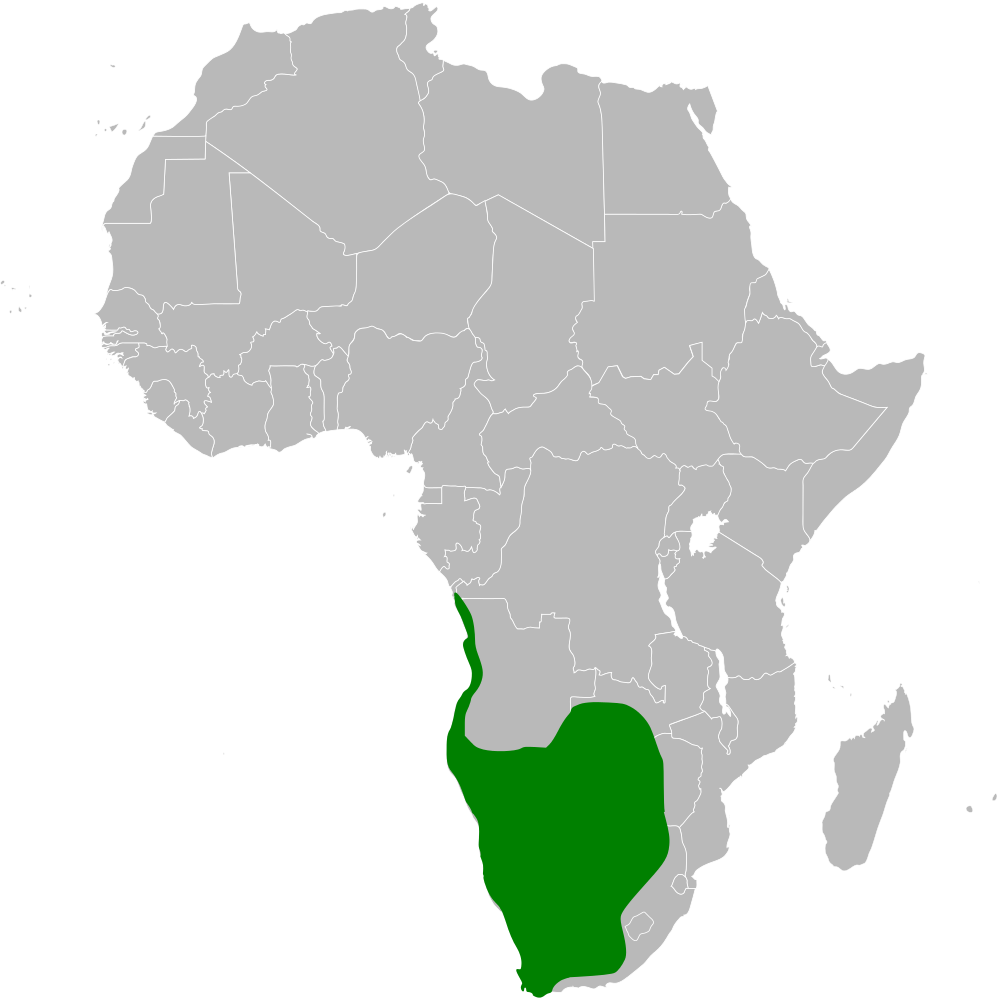

Synonyms
- Megalotis verticalis

= Grey-backed sparrow-lark =

Species of bird

The grey-backed sparrow-lark (Eremopterix verticalis) or grey-backed finch-lark is a species of lark in the family Alaudidae. It is found in southern and south-central Africa. Its natural habitats are subtropical or tropical dry shrubland and subtropical or tropical dry lowland grassland. Sometimes, the name 'grey-backed sparrow-lark' is also used to describe the black-eared sparrow-lark.

== Taxonomy and systematics ==
=== Subspecies ===
Four subspecies are recognized:

- E. v. khama - Irwin, 1957: Found in north-eastern Botswana, western Zimbabwe and western Zambia
- E. v. harti - Benson & Irwin, 1965: Found in south-western Zambia
- E. v. damarensis - Roberts, 1931: Found from western Angola and south-western Zambia to western South Africa
- E. v. verticalis - (Smith, 1836): Found from south-eastern Botswana and south-western Zimbabwe to southern South Africa
