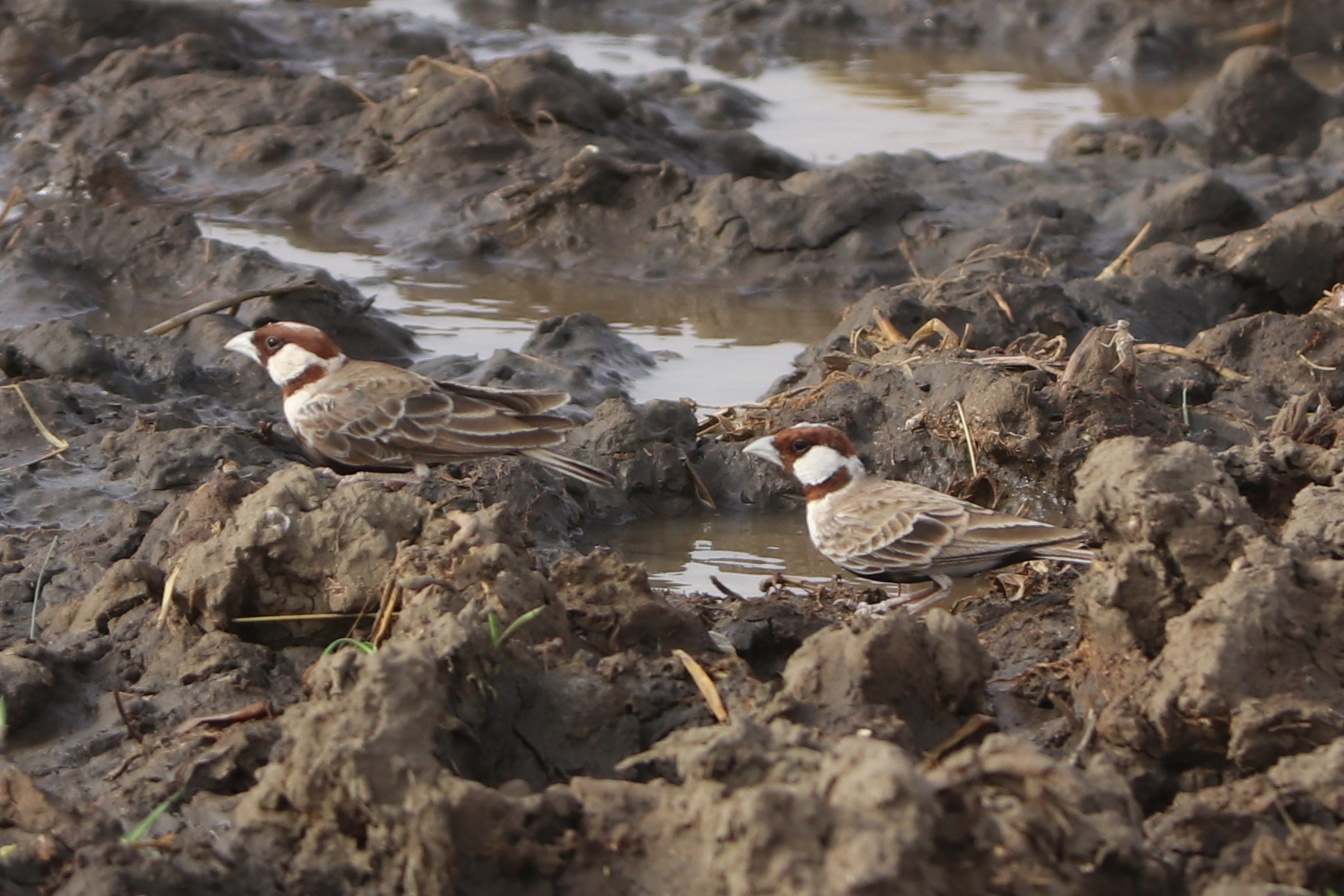
- Beside Lake Turkana, Ethiopia

Conservation status
- Least Concern (IUCN 3.1)

Scientific classification
- Kingdom: Animalia
- Phylum: Chordata
- Class: Aves
- Order: Passeriformes
- Family: Alaudidae
- Genus: Eremopterix
- Species: E. signatus

Binomial name
- Eremopterix signatus (Oustalet, 1886)

Subspecies
- See text
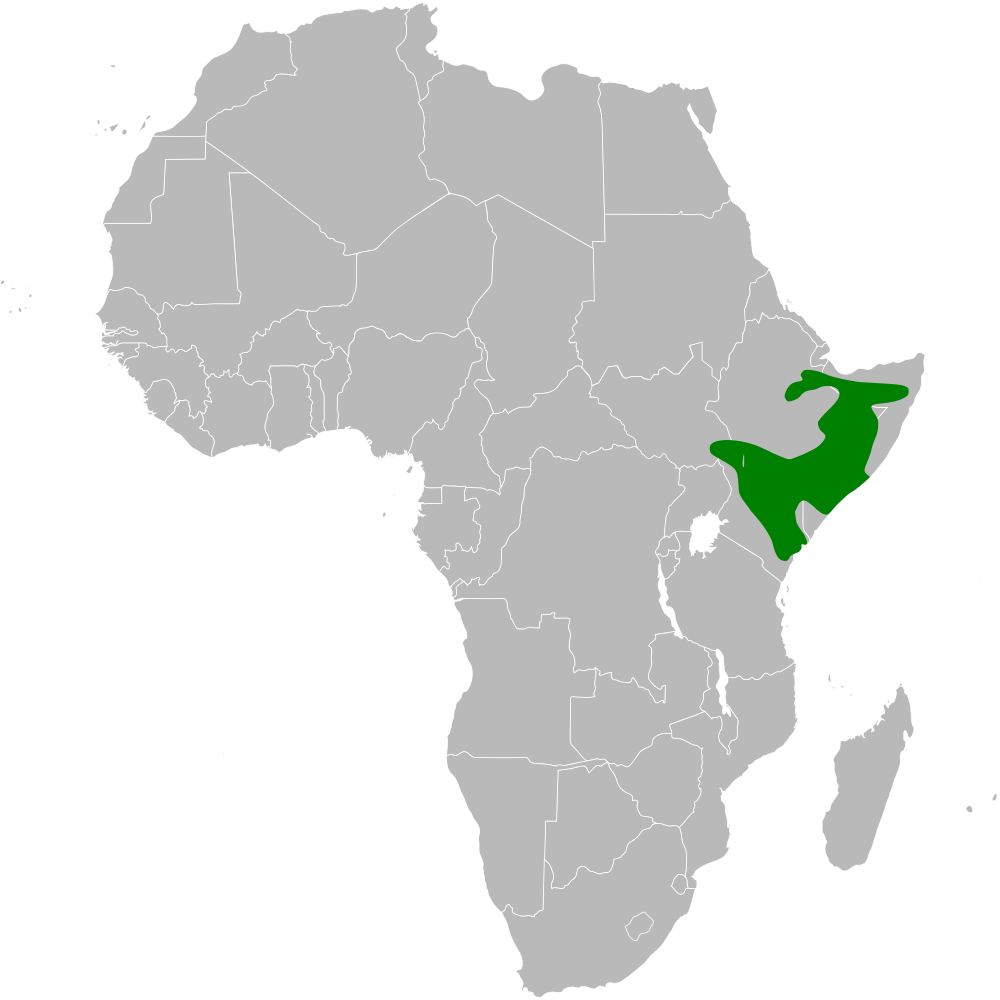

Synonyms
- Eremopterix signata; Pyrrhulauda signata

= Chestnut-headed sparrow-lark =

Species of bird

The chestnut-headed sparrow-lark (Eremopterix signatus) or chestnut-headed finch-lark is a species of passerine bird in the family Alaudidae. It is found in eastern and north-eastern Africa. Its natural habitats are subtropical or tropical dry shrubland, subtropical or tropical dry lowland grassland, and hot deserts.

== Taxonomy and systematics ==
=== Subspecies ===
Two subspecies are recognized:

- E. s. harrisoni - (Ogilvie-Grant, 1900): Found in south-eastern Sudan and north-western Kenya
- E. s. signatus - (Oustalet, 1886): Found in southern and eastern Ethiopia, Somalia and eastern Kenya

== Description ==
The male chestnut-headed sparrow-lark has a black collar and bib, white cheeks and a white circular area on the nape of the crown, surrounded by a chestnut border. This distinguishes it from Fischer's sparrow-lark which lacks the white spot. The female has duller plumage.

== Behaviour and ecology ==
This bird is usually found in pairs or small flocks of up to forty birds, often around water holes. It flies low to the ground and may sing in flight or when standing on bare ground.
