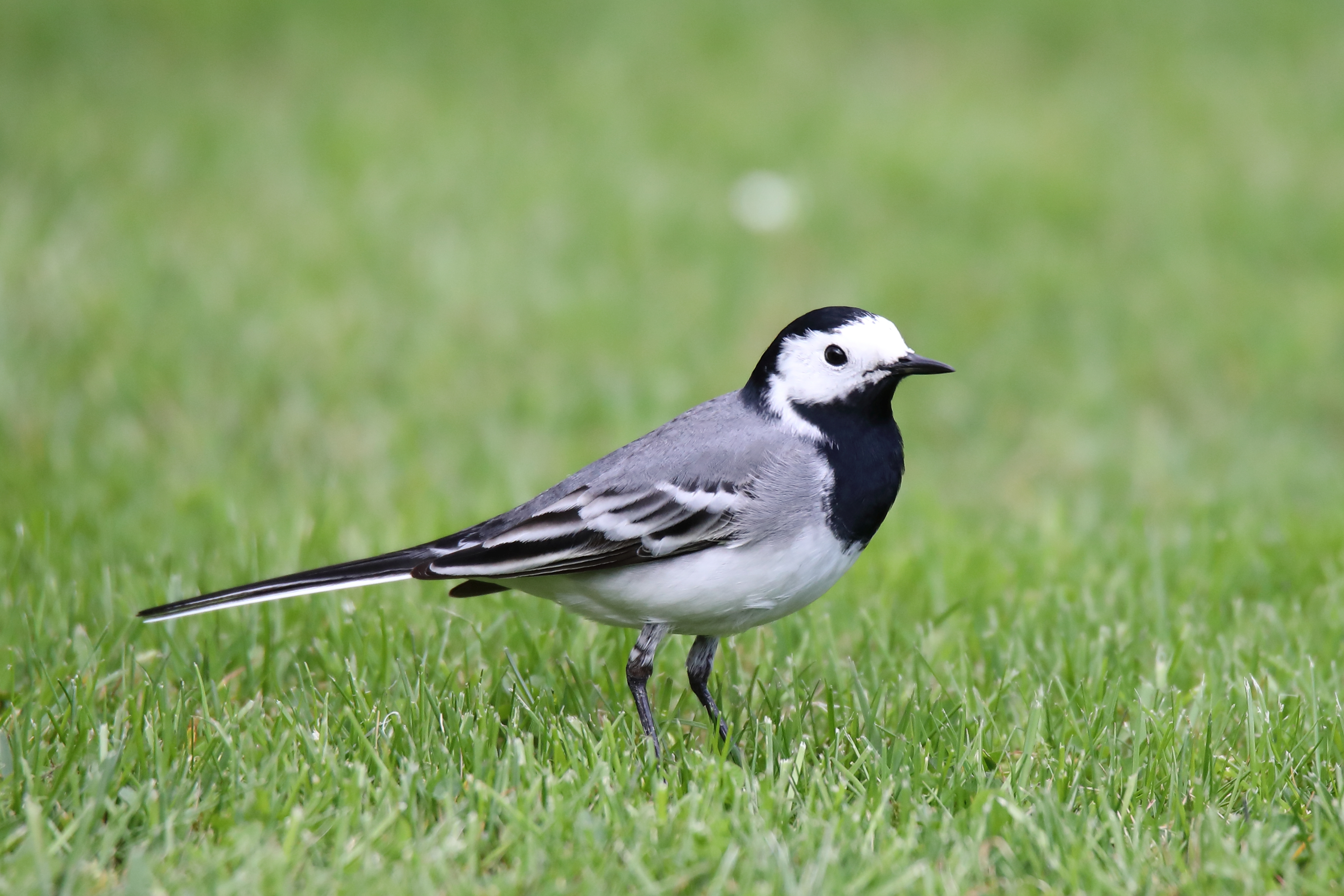
- Adult male M. alba alba
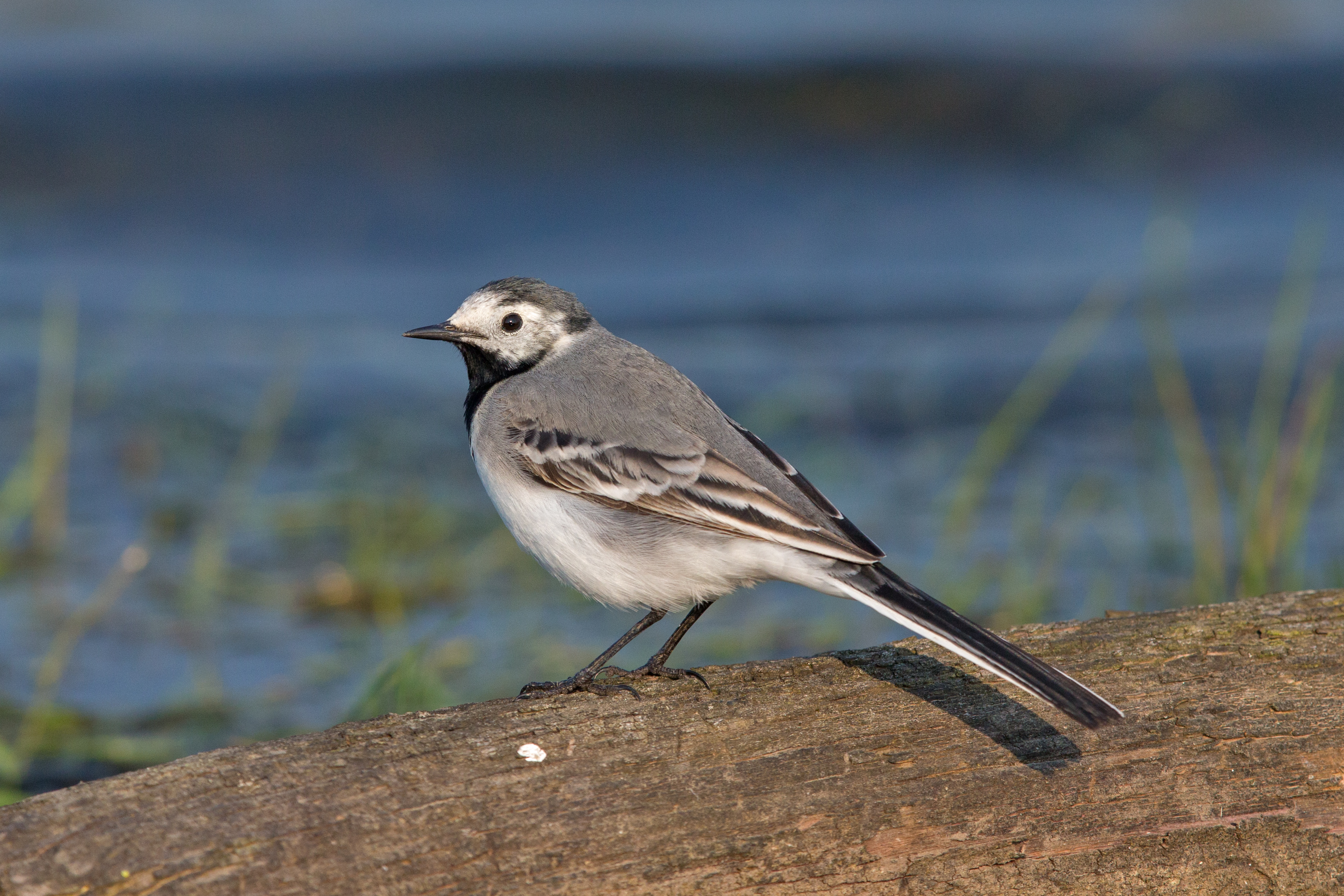
- First summer female M. alba alba

Conservation status
- Least Concern (IUCN 3.1)

Scientific classification
- Kingdom: Animalia
- Phylum: Chordata
- Class: Aves
- Order: Passeriformes
- Family: Motacillidae
- Genus: Motacilla
- Species: M. alba

Binomial name
- Motacilla alba Linnaeus, 1758
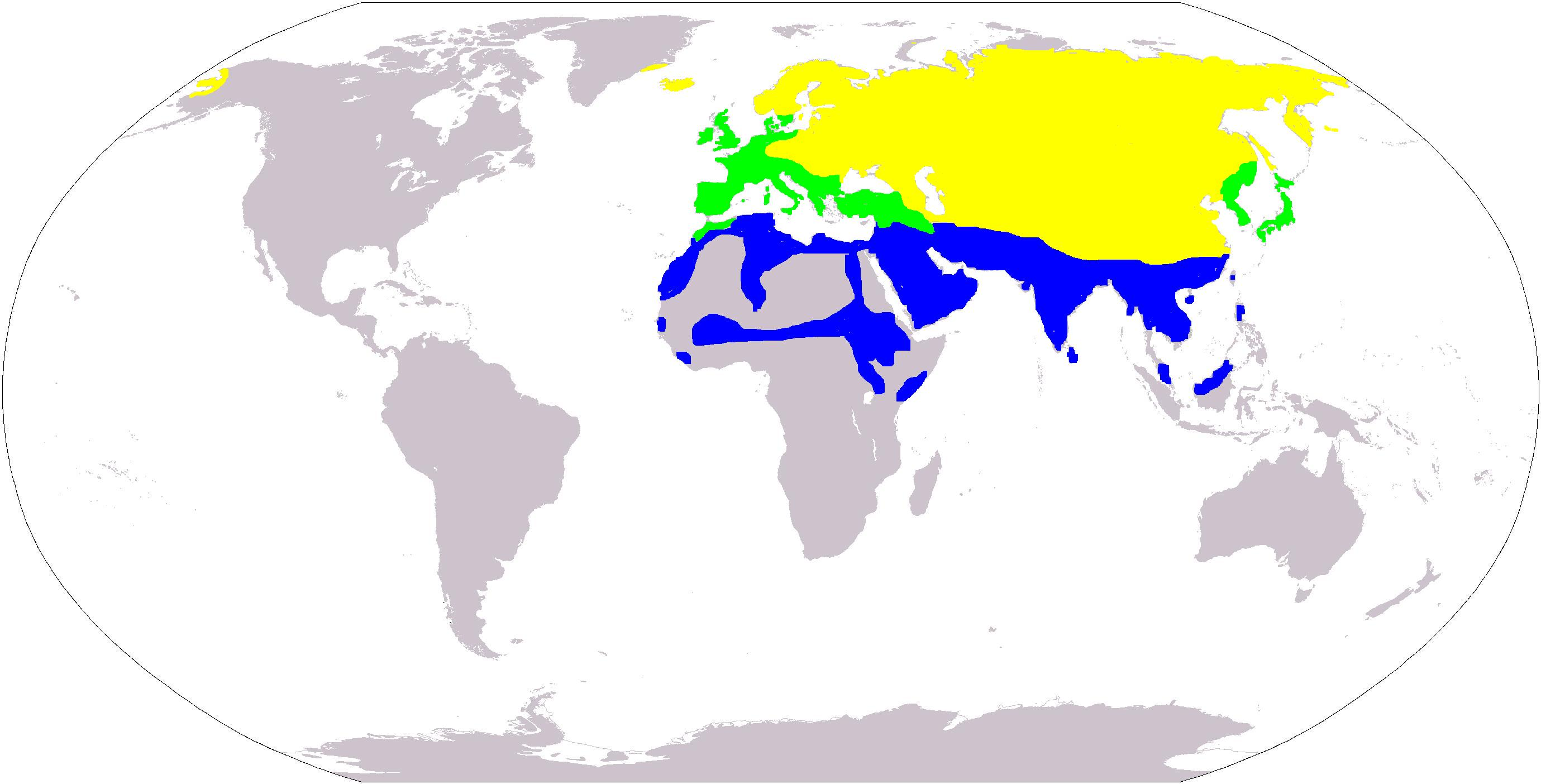
- Summer range Year-round range Winter range

= White wagtail =

Species of bird

The white wagtail (Motacilla alba) is a small passerine bird in the family Motacillidae, which also includes pipits and longclaws. The species breeds in the Palearctic zone in most of Europe and Asia and parts of North Africa; it also has a toehold in western Alaska as a scarce breeder. It is resident in the mildest parts of its range, but otherwise migrates to Africa. In total, there are between 9 and 11 subspecies of M. alba; in Ireland and Great Britain, the black-backed subspecies known as the pied wagtail (M. a. yarrellii) predominates.

The white wagtail is an insectivorous bird of open country, often near habitation and water. It prefers bare areas for feeding, where it can see and pursue its prey. In urban areas, it has adapted to foraging on paved areas such as car parks. It nests in crevices in stone walls and similar natural and human-made structures.

It is the national bird of Latvia and has featured on the stamps of several countries. It is listed as being 'of least concern' by IUCN.

== Taxonomy and systematics ==
Breeding ranges of the major races

The white wagtail was one of the many species originally described by Carl Linnaeus in his landmark 1758 10th edition of Systema Naturae, and it still bears its original name Motacilla alba. The Latin genus name originally meant "little mover", but certain medieval writers thought it meant "wag-tail", giving rise to a new false Latin word cilla for "tail". The specific epithet alba is Latin for "white".

Within the wagtail genus Motacilla, the white wagtail's closest genetic relatives appear to be other black-and-white wagtails such as the Japanese wagtail Motacilla grandis and the white-browed wagtail Motacilla madaraspatensis (and possibly the Mekong wagtail Motacilla samveasnae, the phylogenetic position of which is mysterious), with which it appears to form a superspecies. However, mtDNA cytochrome b and NADH dehydrogenase subunit 2 sequence data suggests that the white wagtail is itself polyphyletic or paraphyletic (i.e. the species is not itself a single coherent grouping). Other phylogenetic studies using mtDNA still suggest that there is considerable gene flow within the races and the resulting closeness makes Motacilla alba a single species. A study has suggested the existence of only two groups: the alba group, with M. a. alba, M. a. yarrellii, M. a. baicalensis, M. a. ocularis, M. a. lugens, and M. a. subpersonata; and the alboides group, with M. a. alboides, M. a. leucopsis and M. a. personata.

== Description ==
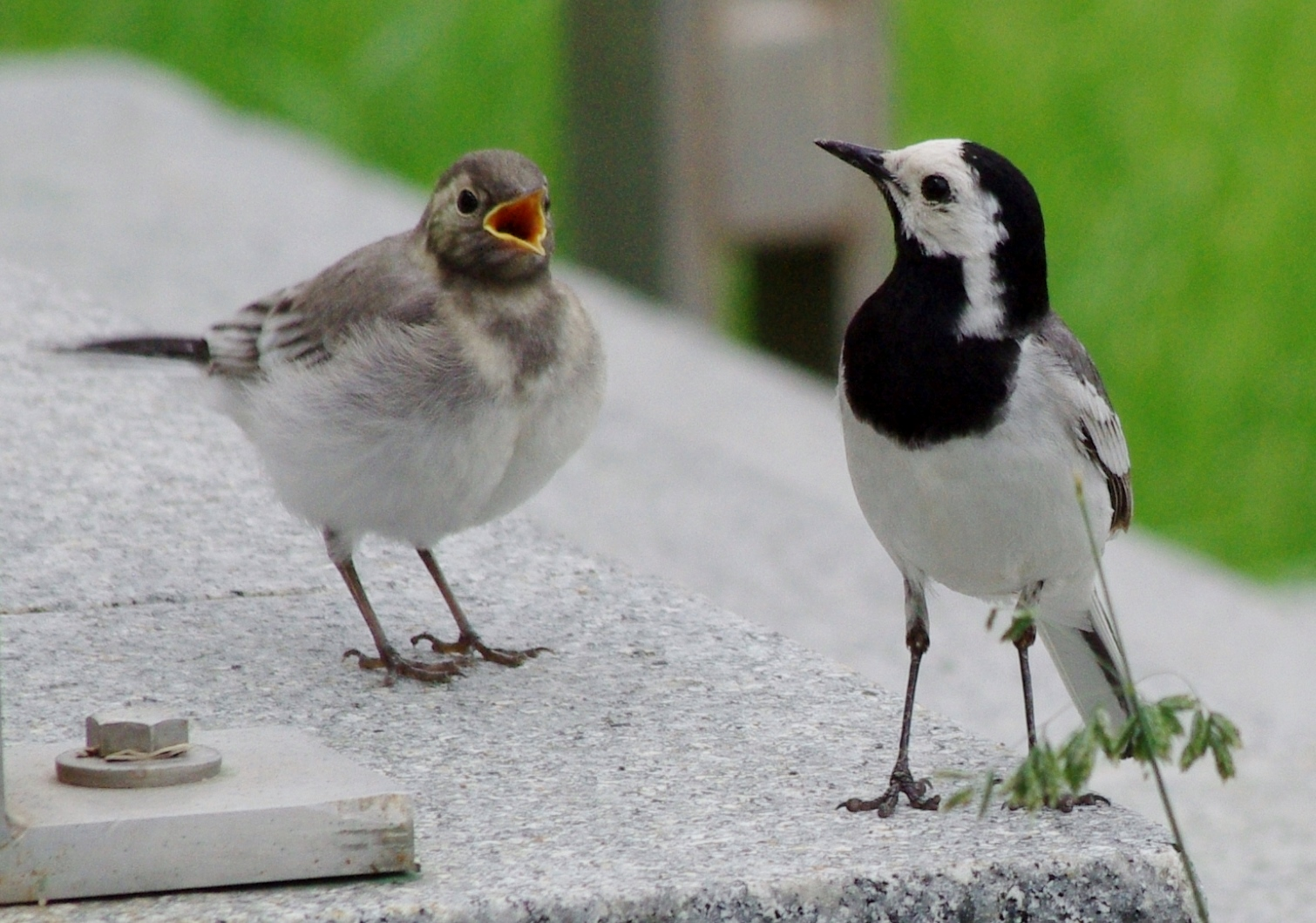
An adult with a juvenile in Kazakhstan

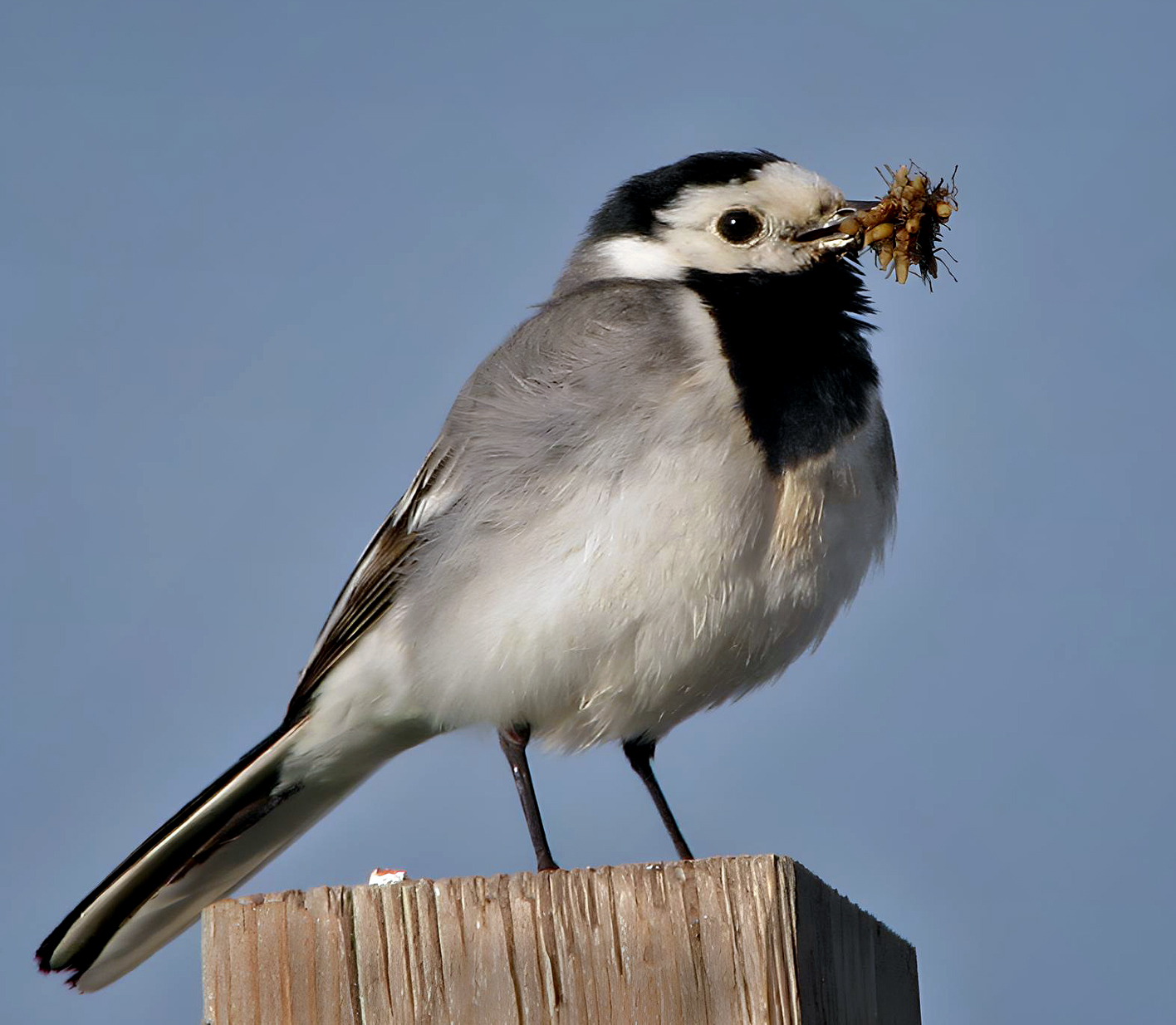
An adult in Sweden with insects in its beak.

The white wagtail is a slender bird, 16.5 to 19 cm (6.5 to 7.5 in) in length; the East Asian subspecies are slightly longer, measuring up to 21 cm (8.3 in). It has the characteristic long, constantly wagging tail of its genus. Its average weight is 25 g (0.88 oz) and the maximum lifespan in the wild is about 12 years.

There are a number of other subspecies, some of which may have arisen because of partial geographical isolation, such as the resident British and Irish form, the pied wagtail M. a. yarrellii, which now also breeds in adjacent areas of the neighbouring European mainland. The pied wagtail, named after the naturalist William Yarrell, exchanges the pale grey colour of the nominate subspecies with black in males, and dark grey in females and juveniles, but is otherwise identical in its behaviour. Other subspecies, the validity of some of which is questionable, differ in the colour of the wings, back, and head, or other features. Some races show sexual dimorphism during the breeding season. As many as six subspecies may be present in the wintering grounds in India or southeast Asia and here they can be difficult to distinguish. Phylogenetic studies using mtDNA suggest that some morphological features have evolved more than once, including the back and chin colour. Breeding M. a. yarrellii look much like the nominate race except for the black back, and M. a. alboides of the Himalayas differs from the Central Asian M. a. personata only by its black back. M. a. personata has been recorded breeding in the Siddar Valley of Kashmir of the Western Himalayas. It has also been noted that both back and chin change colour during the pre-basic moult; all black-throated subspecies develop white chins and throats in winter and some black-backed birds are grey-backed in winter.

The call of the white wagtail is a sharp chissick, slightly softer than the version given by the pied wagtail. The song is more regular in white than pied, but with little territorial significance, since the male uses a series of contact calls to attract the female.

=== Subspecies ===
Information on the plumage differences and distribution of the subspecies of the white wagtail is shown below. Nine subspecies are generally accepted. Two others, M. a. dukhunensis and M. a. persica, are accepted by some other authors, but are generally considered synonyms of M. a. alba. The black-backed wagtail M. a. lugens may be a separate species.

Subspecies	Range	Notes	Image
M. a. yarrellii	Great Britain and Ireland; birds in the northern part of the range winter in Spain and North Africa, those further south are resident.	Pied wagtail. Has a much blacker back than the nominate race, black of throat continues on side of neck. Named after William Yarrell (1784–1856), the writer of the History of British Birds (first ed. 1843).	
M. a. alba	Europe from the Iberian Peninsula to Ural Mountains, Turkey, the Levant, Iceland, the Faroe Islands and Greenland's eastern coast. Some migrate to the south of Europe and Africa down as far as Kenya and Malawi. In Britain, they breed on Shetland and occasionally elsewhere, and are regular on passage (mostly from Iceland, but also Scandinavia) in spring and autumn.	Nominate subspecies	
M. a. subpersonata	Morocco; non-migratory resident	Moroccan wagtail. It has more black on the head than the nominate, and resembles a grey-backed, white-throated African pied wagtail	
M. a. personata	Hindu Kush, Tian Shan, Altay Mountains (northern Iran, Afghanistan, Tajikistan, Kyrgyzstan, Kazakhstan, Xinjiang)	Masked wagtail. All-black head with a white face mask	
M. a. baicalensis	Russia in Lake Baikal area, Mongolia, Inner Mongolia	Resembles M. a. leucopsis but grey back and less white on head and wing.	
M. a. ocularis	Siberia, Far Eastern (Russia, eastwards from Central Siberian Plateau) expanding into West Alaska	Similar to M. a. lugens, but with an all grey rump, clearer blue-grey and darker gray back.	
M. a. lugens	Russia Far East (Primorsky Krai, Khabarovsk Krai), Kamchatka Peninsula, Kuril Islands, Sakhalin, Japan (Hokkaidō, Honshū)	Black-backed wagtail or Kamchatka/Japanese pied wagtail, similar to M. a. yarrellii, but has a black eyestripe and white remiges; might have a claim to constitute a distinct species.	
M. a. leucopsis	China, Korean Peninsula, Japan (Ryukyu Islands, Kyūshū), expanding into Japan (Honshū), Southeast Asia, India, and Oceania	Amur wagtail	
M. a. alboides	Himalayas and surrounding area	This subspecies has a black back and a lot of black around the head, a white wing panel and white edges on the secondaries and tertials.	
[M. a. persica]	North central and western Iran.	Intermediate between M. a. dukhunensis and M. a. personata. Now usually included in alba; appears to be hybrid or intergrade population.	
[M. a. dukhunensis]	West Siberian Plain east Caspian Sea (part of Russia, Kazakhstan, Uzbekistan, Turkmenistan); winters in the Middle East, India and Bangladesh. Now usually included in M. a. alba.	Indian pied wagtail. The upperparts of this subspecies are paler and more blue-grey than nominate, and has it has a continuous unbroken white panel on wing coverts.	M. a. dukhunensis

== Distribution and habitat ==
White wagtails sitting in a spruce and flying away; their characteristic flight pattern is visible. Kõrvemaa, Estonia, Spring 2021

This species breeds throughout Eurasia up to latitudes 75°N, only being absent in the Arctic from areas where the July isotherm is less than 4 °C. It also breeds in the mountains of Morocco and western Alaska. It occupies a wide range of habitats, but is absent from deserts. White wagtails are residents in the milder parts of its range such as the western half of Europe and the Mediterranean, but migratory in much of the rest of its range. Northern European breeders winter around the Mediterranean and in tropical and subtropical Africa, and Asiatic birds move to the Middle East, India, and Southeast Asia. Birds from the North American population also winter in tropical Asia.

== Behaviour and ecology ==
The most conspicuous habit of this species is a near-constant tail wagging, a trait that has given the species, and indeed the genus, its common name. In spite of the ubiquity of this behaviour, the reasons for it are poorly understood. It has been suggested that it may flush prey, or signal submissiveness to other wagtails. A study in 2004 has suggested instead that it is a signal of vigilance to potential predators.

=== Diet and feeding ===
The exact composition of the diet of white wagtails varies by location, but terrestrial and aquatic insects and other small invertebrates form the major part of the diet. These range from beetles, dragonflies, small snails, spiders, worms, crustaceans, to maggots found in carcasses and, most importantly, flies. Small fish fry have also been recorded in the diet. The white wagtail is somewhat unusual in the parts of its range where it is non-migratory as it is an insectivorous bird that continues to feed on insects during the winter (most other insectivorous birds in temperate climates migrate or switch to more vegetable matter).

=== Breeding ===
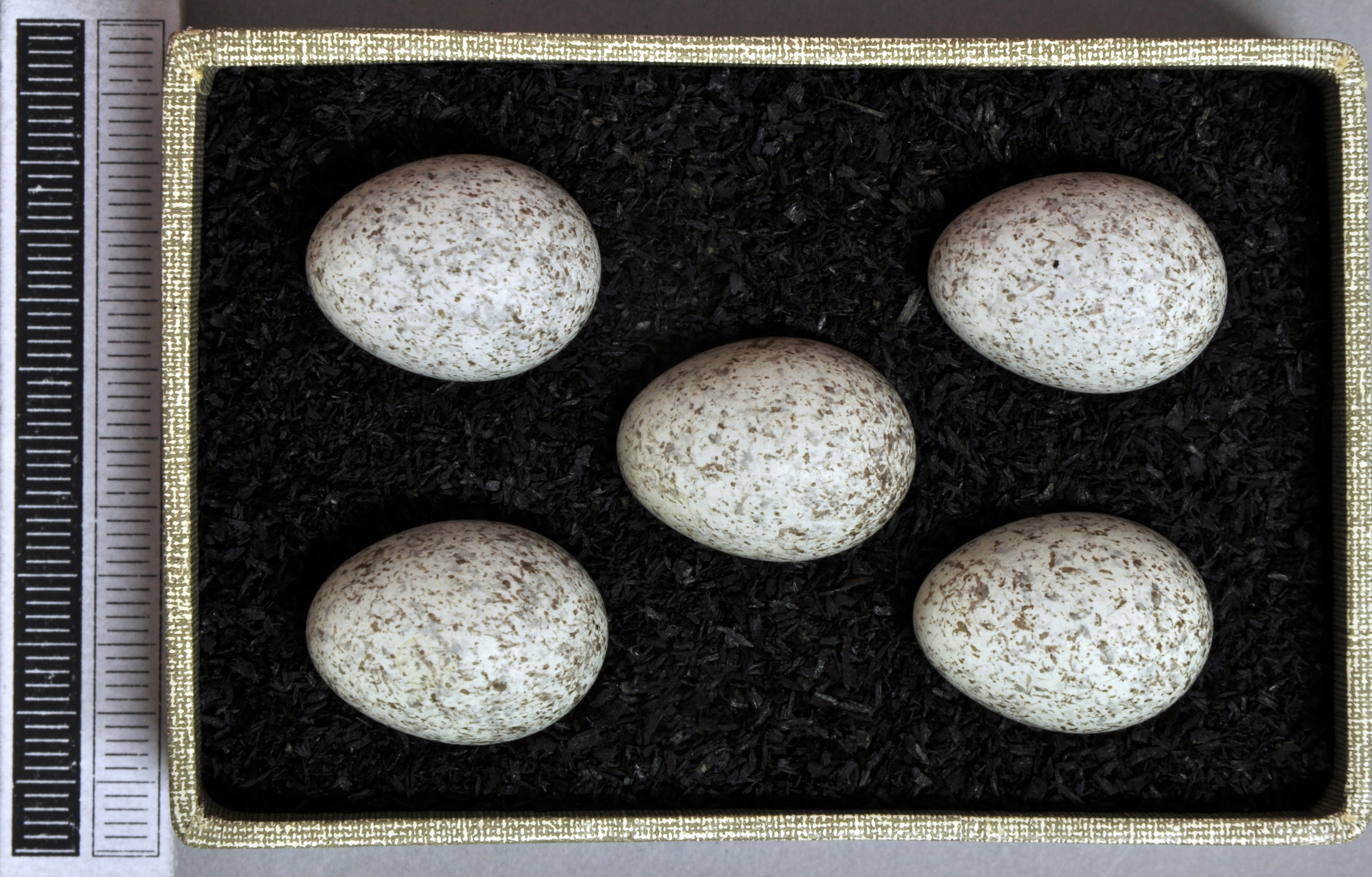
Eggs, Collection Museum Wiesbaden, Germany

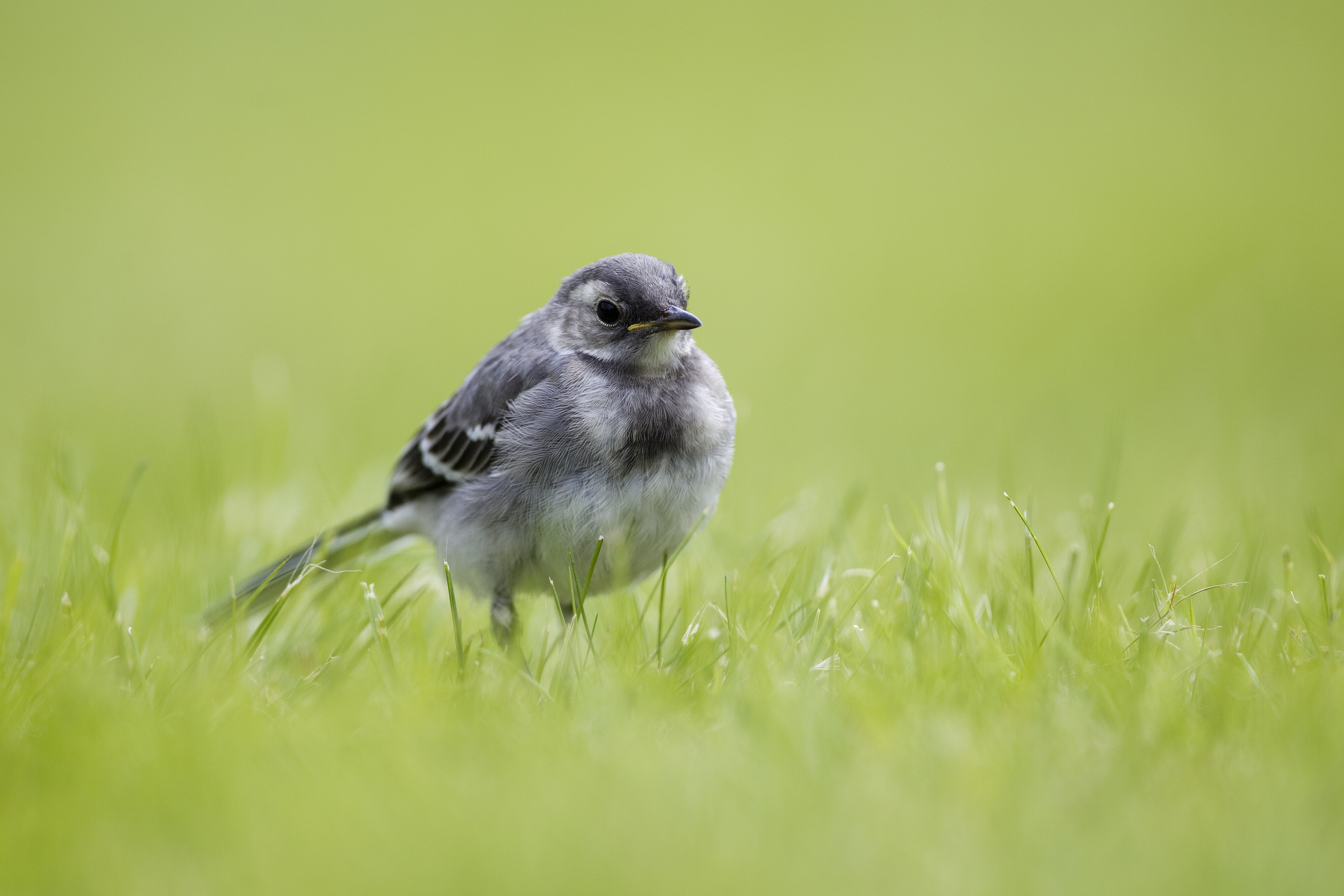
Juvenile M. a. alba in northern Norway, showing the grey face and chest

White wagtails are monogamous and defend breeding territories. The breeding season for most is from April to August, with the season starting later further north. Both sexes are responsible for building the nest, with the male responsible for initiating the nest building and the female for finishing the process. For second broods in the subspecies personata the female alone builds the nest, which is a rough cup assembled from twigs, grass, leaves and other plant matter, as the male is still provisioning the young. It is lined with soft materials, including animal hair. The nest is set into a crevice or hole, traditionally in a bank next to a river or ditch, but the species has also adapted to nesting in walls, bridges and buildings. One nest was found in the skull of a walrus. White wagtails will nest in association with other animals; particularly, where available, the dams of beavers and also inside the nests of golden eagles. Three to eight eggs are laid, with the usual number being four to six. The eggs are cream-coloured, often with a faint bluish-green or turquoise tint, and heavily spotted with reddish brown; they measure, on average, 21 mm × 15 mm (0.83 in × 0.59 in). Both parents incubate the eggs, although the female generally does so for longer and incubates at night. The eggs begin to hatch after 12 days (sometimes as late as 16 days). Both parents feed the chicks until they fledge after between 12 and 15 days, and the chicks are fed for another week after fledging.

Though it is known to be a host species for the common cuckoo, the white wagtail typically deserts its nest if it has been parasitised. Moksnes et al. theorised that this occurs because the wagtail is too small to push the intruding egg out of the nest, and too short-billed to destroy the egg by puncturing it.

== Status ==
This species has a large range, with an estimated extent of more than 10 million square kilometres (3.9 million square miles). The population size is between 130 and 230 million. Population trends have not been quantified, but the species is not believed to approach the thresholds for the population decline criterion of the IUCN Red List (i.e. declining more than 30% in ten years or three generations). For these reasons, the species is evaluated to be of least concern. The population in Europe appears to be stable. The species has adapted well to human changes to the environment and has exploited human changes such as human-made structures that are used for nesting sites and increased open areas that are used for foraging. In a number of cities, notably Dublin, large flocks gather in winter to roost. They are therefore rated as of least concern. However, they are caught for sport and then placed into collections. They are also kept as cagebirds and eaten as food. Climate change may be affecting the time of their migration.

== In culture ==
They have featured on stamps from Bahrain, Belarus, Belgium, Finland, Georgia, Hong Kong, Hungary, Iceland, Iran, Ireland, Israel, Jersey, Kuwait, Latvia, Norway, Poland, the United Kingdom and Vietnam. The white wagtail is the national bird of Latvia, and has been often mentioned in its folk songs. It also appears in the logo of the Latvian Ornithological Society.

The pied wagtail has occasionally been called "water wagtail"; and in Ireland "willie wagtail", not to be confused with the Australian species Rhipidura leucophrys which bears the same common name.
