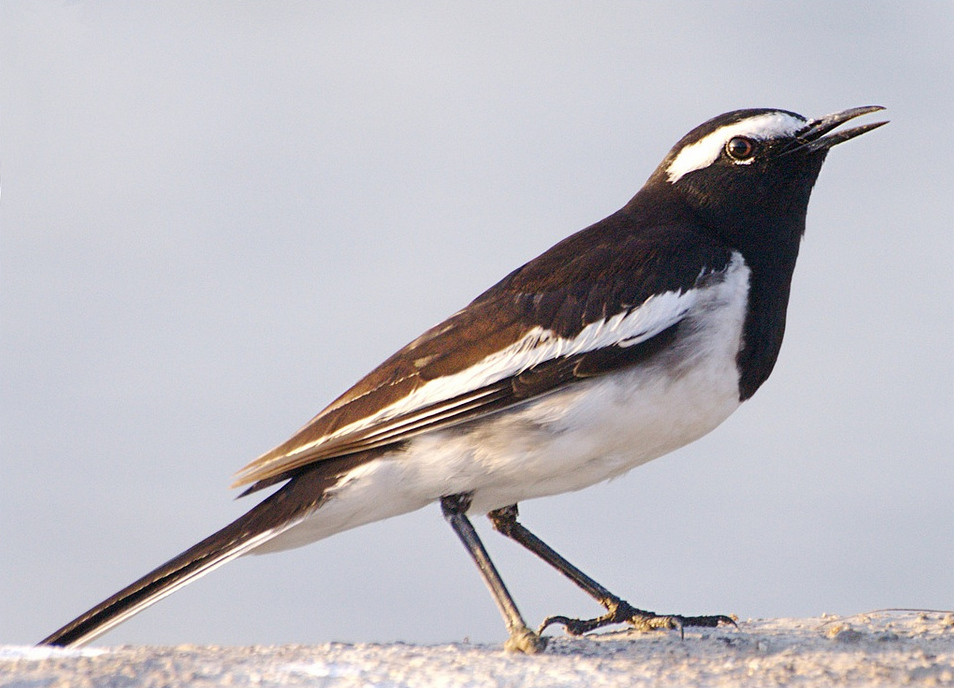

Conservation status
- Least Concern (IUCN 3.1)

Scientific classification
- Kingdom: Animalia
- Phylum: Chordata
- Class: Aves
- Order: Passeriformes
- Family: Motacillidae
- Genus: Motacilla
- Species: M. maderaspatensis

Binomial name
- Motacilla maderaspatensis Gmelin, JF, 1789
- Year-round range (green), non-breeding visitor (blue)

Synonyms
- Motacilla madaraspatensis lapsus Motacilla lugubris maderaspatensis Motacilla picata Motacilla maderaspatana Motacilla maderas

Audio
- Calls

= White-browed wagtail =

Species of bird

The white-browed wagtail or large pied wagtail (Motacilla maderaspatensis) is a medium-sized bird and is the largest member of the wagtail family. They are conspicuously patterned with black above and white below, a prominent white brow, shoulder stripe and outer tail feathers. White-browed wagtails are native to the Indian subcontinent, common near small water bodies and have adapted to urban environments where they often nest on roof tops. The specific name is derived from the Indian city of Madras (now Chennai).

== Taxonomy ==
The white-browed wagtail was formally described in 1789 by the German naturalist Johann Friedrich Gmelin in his revised and expanded edition of Carl Linnaeus's Systema Naturae. He placed it with the wagtails in the genus Motacilla and coined the binomial name Motacilla maderaspatensis. The specific epithet is Modern Latin for the locality, Madras (or Madraspattanam and now Chennai) in southern India. Gmelin's account was based on the "black and white wagtail" that had been described and illustrated in 1713 by the English naturalist John Ray. The species is monotypic: no subspecies are recognised.

== Description ==
The white-browed wagtail is the largest species of wagtail at 21 cm (8.3 in) length. It is a slender bird, with the characteristic long, constantly wagging tail of its genus. It has black upperparts, head and breast, with a white supercilium and large white wingbar. Unlike white wagtails it never has white on the forehead. The rest of the underparts are white. The female has the black less intense than in the male. Juveniles are like the females brown-grey where the adult is black.

== Distribution and habitat ==
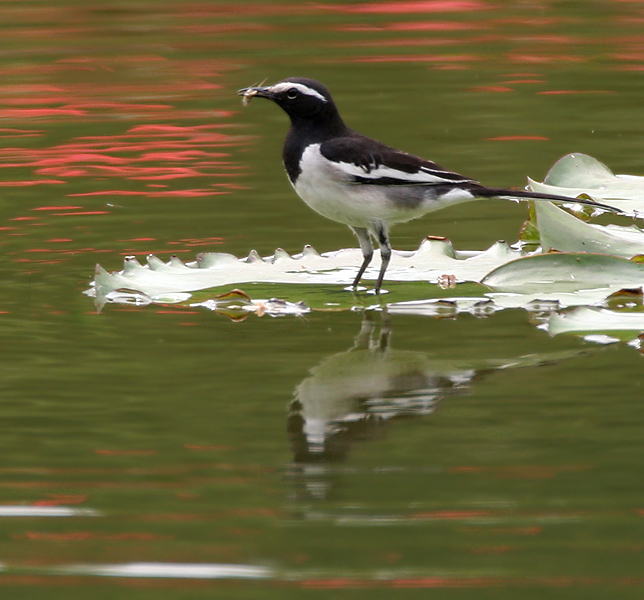
Foraging on a water lily leaf

The white-browed wagtail is a resident breeder in India and is endemic to the Indian subcontinent. It is found south of the Himalayas, east of the Indus system and to the west of Bangladesh. It is rare in the higher altitude regions but has been seen in Ladakh on the edge of the Tibetan plateau. In most of India it is found below 1000 m but in southern India it goes up into the hills up to 2200 m. It is very rare in the Indus valley area. It is absent from the Sind region of Pakistan. It is found in open freshwater wetland habitats. It is one of the few Motacilla wagtails that has adapted well to urban habitats and is often found perched on overhead water storages in residential buildings.

It is a rare winter visitor to Sri Lanka and have possibly extended their range in recent times.

== Taxonomy and systematics ==
Stuart Baker in his second edition of The Fauna of British India considered this as a subspecies of the white wagtail, calling it Motacilla lugubris maderaspatensis. This was however criticized by C B Ticehurst, who noted that it was much larger, never had the white forehead of the white wagtail, was non-migratory and lacked a spring moult. This species is now considered to form a superspecies with Japanese wagtail, Mekong wagtail and the more distant African pied wagtail. Similarities in pre-copulatory behaviour with the Japanese wagtail have been noted. Its song much resembles that of the recently described Mekong wagtail. mtDNA cytochrome b and NADH dehydrogenase subunit 2 sequence data has not been able to robustly resolve the relationships of these birds, especially in respect to the blue-headed wagtail and its relatives.

The species is considered monotypic and subspecies such as kangrae described by Walter Koelz are not recognized.

== Behaviour and ecology ==
Usually seen in pairs or small groups near open water. They call often especially in the mornings and are active like most other wagtails. They will perch on the ground as well as on wires or on buildings. The song is long and loud with many different notes. The usual call is a wheezy "wheech". They can fly fairly rapidly for long distances and they fly with a bounding (dipping and rising) flight pattern and have been recorded to travel at the speed of about 40 km/h.

Endoparasitic filarial parasites of the species Splendidofilaria singhi have been recorded in individuals of the species.

=== Breeding ===
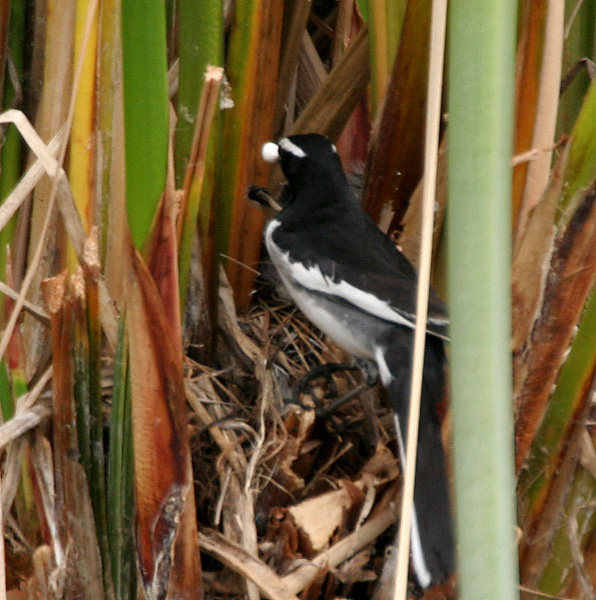
White-browed wagtail at nest in Hyderabad, India

The breeding season is March to October. In southern India, the nesting season begins when river levels drop and continue until the Monsoon rains. In courtship, the male shoots into the air with a single wing beat, sings and glides with dangling legs and puffed feathers. On settling, the tail of the male is raised high and wings held up over the back and the tip is quivered stiffly while he steps around the female. The female responds by crouching and shivering the wings as if begging for food.

It builds its cup-shaped nest placed on the ground or rocks in a hole, ledge or mud bank and is always located close to water. Artificial structures such as bridges and roof tops are also used. Nests have been noticed in a regularly used ferry. The nest is made of grass, roots, algae and other material with a central neat cup lined with hair. Normally four, and three to five eggs is the usual clutch.

=== Food ===
Like other wagtails, this species is insectivorous. Nestlings were mainly fed orthopterans, caterpillars and spiders. Stayphylinid beetles and pentatomid bugs have also been recorded in their diet. They have adapted to urban environments where water may be found mainly on rooftops as overflow from storage tanks.

== In culture ==
In older times in India, the species was sometimes kept as a cage-bird and was acclaimed for its singing ability. The native name of khanjan is used in the phrase "khanjan-eyed" to describe someone with beautiful eyes. The Khanjan was held sacred and considered a good omen in India as it supposedly bore an impression of Vishnu's shaligram on its breast. A variety of beliefs on the future predicted by where the bird sat and what it did have been documented by Saratchandra Mitra. Another local name for wagtails in India is dhobin (or washerwoman).
