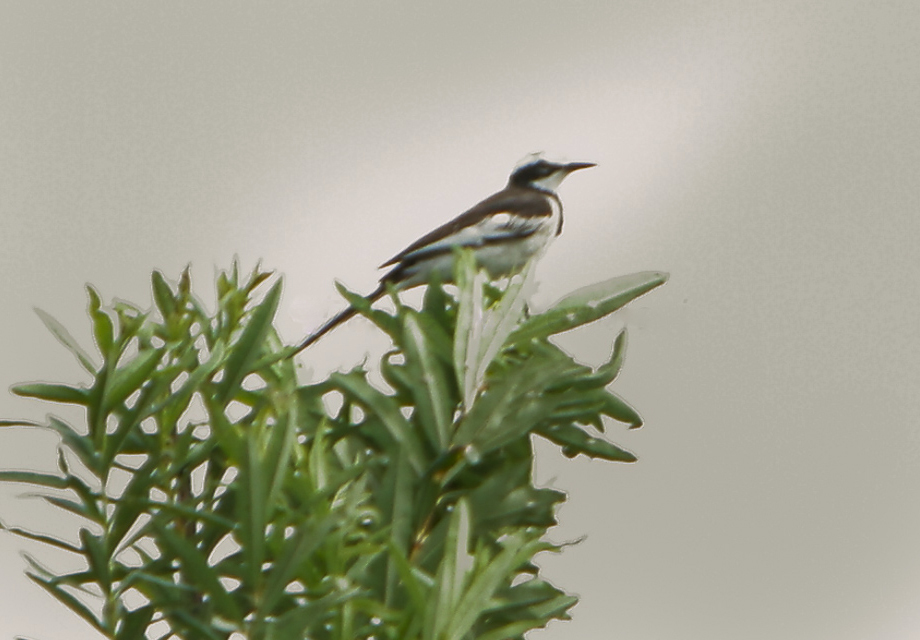

Conservation status
- Near Threatened (IUCN 3.1)

Scientific classification
- Kingdom: Animalia
- Phylum: Chordata
- Class: Aves
- Order: Passeriformes
- Family: Motacillidae
- Genus: Motacilla
- Species: M. samveasnae

Binomial name
- Motacilla samveasnae Duckworth, Alström, Davidson, PJ, Evans, Poole, Setha & Timmins, 2001

= Mekong wagtail =

Species of bird

The Mekong wagtail (Motacilla samveasnae) is a species of bird in the family Motacillidae. It was first described in 2001 and named in honour of the late Cambodian ornithologist Sam Veasna. It is a black and white bird, similar in appearance to the African pied wagtail, although their ranges do not overlap. Its facial features and distinctive voice distinguish it from other black and white wagtails in southeastern Asia.

The Mekong wagtail is found in the Mekong valley of Cambodia and Laos, and is a non-breeding visitor to Thailand and Vietnam. Its typical habitat is rocky areas beside fast-flowing stretches of river where seasonal flooding occurs. Although tolerant of humans, it is threatened by large scale alterations to its habitat such as inundation of riverine habitat following damming of the river.

== Description ==
The Mekong wagtail most closely resembles African pied wagtail M. aguimp, although two species ranges are far apart. It differs from M. agiump in several minor respects, particularly wing pattern, and its vocalisations are very distinctive. It is a very distinctive species and is the only black-and-white wagtail in South-East Asia which exhibits the plumage character combination of black forehead, lores and ear coverts, obvious white supercilia, with white a throat and neck patch.

== Distribution ==
The Mekong River breeding in Cambodia and Laos, but apparently it is a non breeding visitor to Thailand. It also occurs in Vietnam.

== Habitat ==
The Mekong wagtail is found in wide lowland river channels. Territorial birds are associated with fast-flowing braided sections of river which flow through a distinctive landscape of rocks, bushes adapted to prolonged seasonal submersion, mainly Homonoia riparia, with sandbars and gravel shoals. As river levels rise during the May/June–October/November rainy season these features become flooded. The species concentrates along earthen banks and associated overhanging vegetation, and patches of exposed sand and silt, where they occur in pairs, some of which are highly territorial, and small flocks of less than a dozen birds.

== Threats ==
The Mekong wagtail is very tolerant of human presence, and its habitat is not very susceptible to human-induced changes. Damming proposals along the Mekong, in particular those on sections where the river has a low gradient, have the potential to destroy significant stretches of its riverine range by inundating the river channel

== Taxonomy ==
The species was overlooked until 2001 when it was described. It is named in honour of the late Cambodian ornithologist Sam Veasna. It is most similar in appearance to the African pied wagtail but genetic evidence suggests that the two are not more closely related to each other compared to other black and white wagtails such as the white wagtail M. alba complex or the white-browed wagtail M. maderaspatensis.
