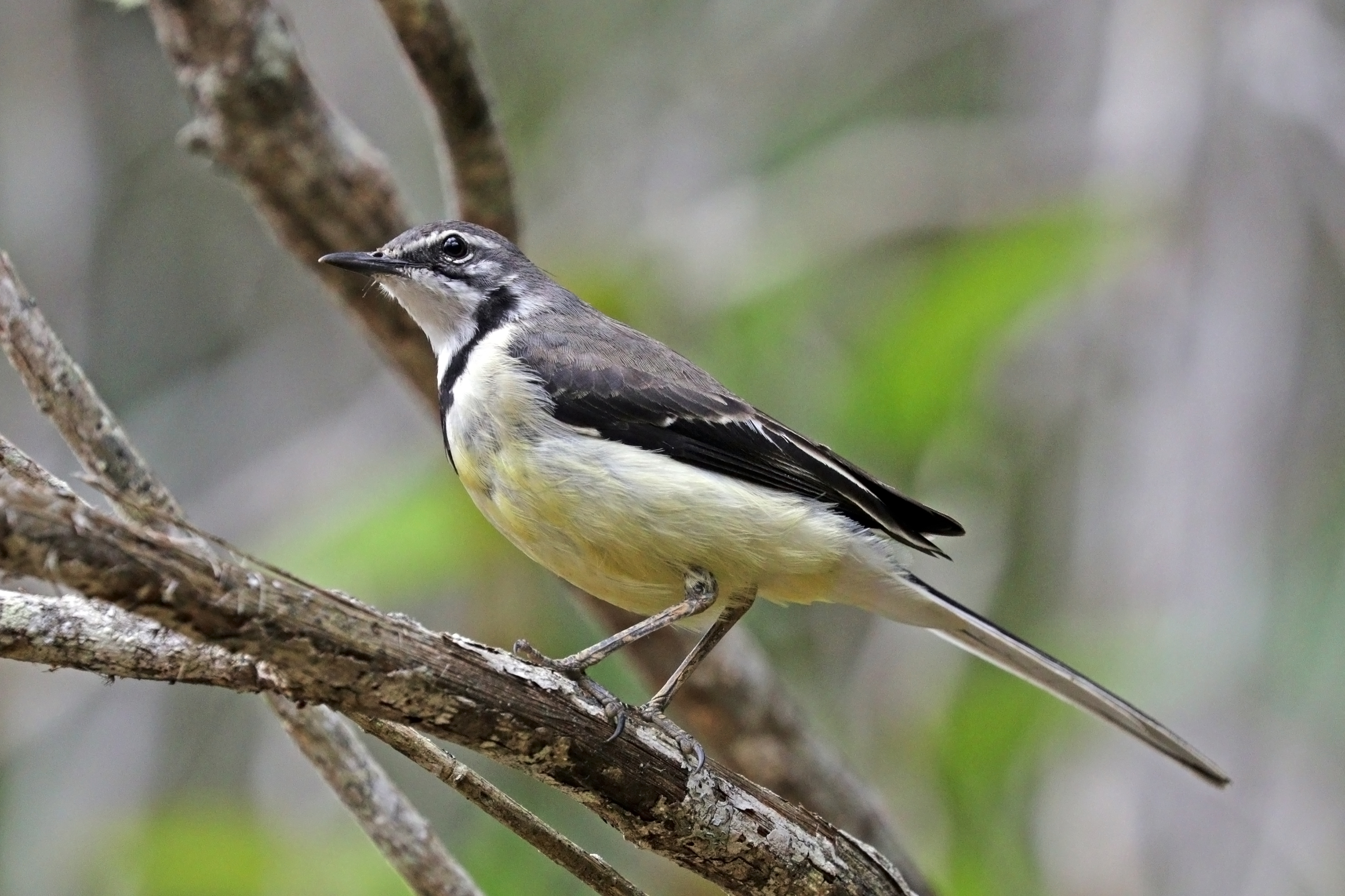
- Andasibe-Mantadia National Park

Conservation status
- Least Concern (IUCN 3.1)

Scientific classification
- Kingdom: Animalia
- Phylum: Chordata
- Class: Aves
- Order: Passeriformes
- Family: Motacillidae
- Genus: Motacilla
- Species: M. flaviventris

Binomial name
- Motacilla flaviventris Hartlaub, 1860

= Madagascar wagtail =

Species of bird

The Madagascar wagtail (Motacilla flaviventris) is a species of wagtail in the family Motacillidae. It is endemic to Madagascar.

== Description ==
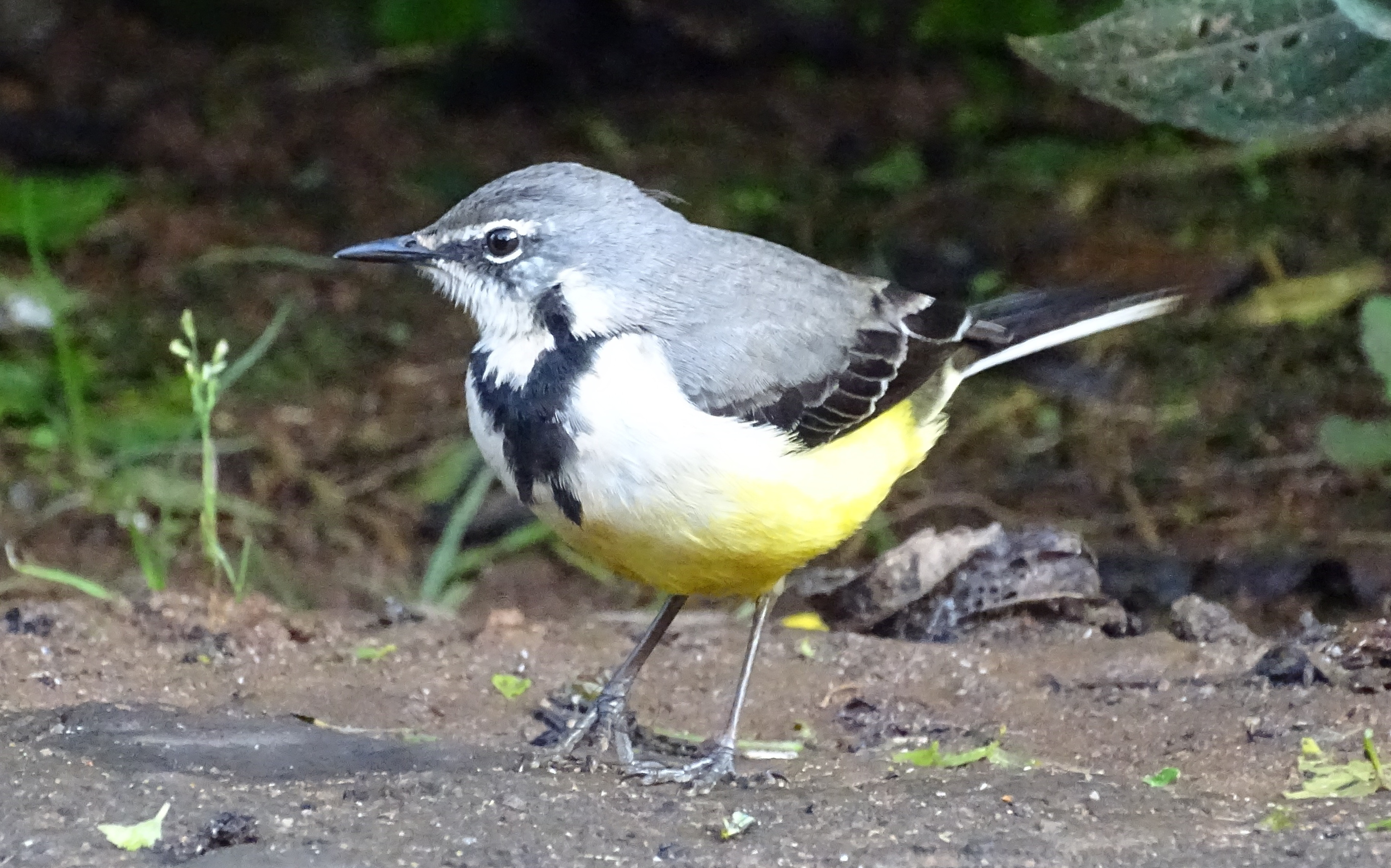
Wagtail at Perinet reserve

The Madagascar wagtail is a large, elegant and slender wagtail which has grey upperparts, a white breast and a yellow belly. There is a black band across the breast and the long tail has a dark centre and white outer tail feathers. There is short white supercilium. Juveniles have a less conspicuous breast band and a fainter supercilium. The body length is 19 cm (7.5 in).

== Distribution and status ==
The Madagascar wagtail is endemic to Madagascar where it is found throughout the island. It is common and widespread and most common in the east of the island and on the central plateau; it is less numerous in the north and west, and rare in the south.

== Habitat ==
The Madagascar wagtail is typically found around water, such as rivers, lakes and seashores, also in open areas such a rice paddies and gardens. It is found from sea level up to 2,500 metres (8,200 ft) above sea level.

== Biology ==
The diet of the Madagascar wagtail mainly consists of small invertebrates, notably insects and spiders. It forages by walking or running on the ground, moving its tail up and down in typical wagtail fashion and suddenly jumping up a few metres into the air to capture prey. It breeds between August and November and is double brooded, with the young of the first brood often assisting their parents feed the second brood. The nest is a bowl shape which is situated near the ground in dense foliage, the fork of a branch, a rock crevice or under the roof of a building but always near water.
