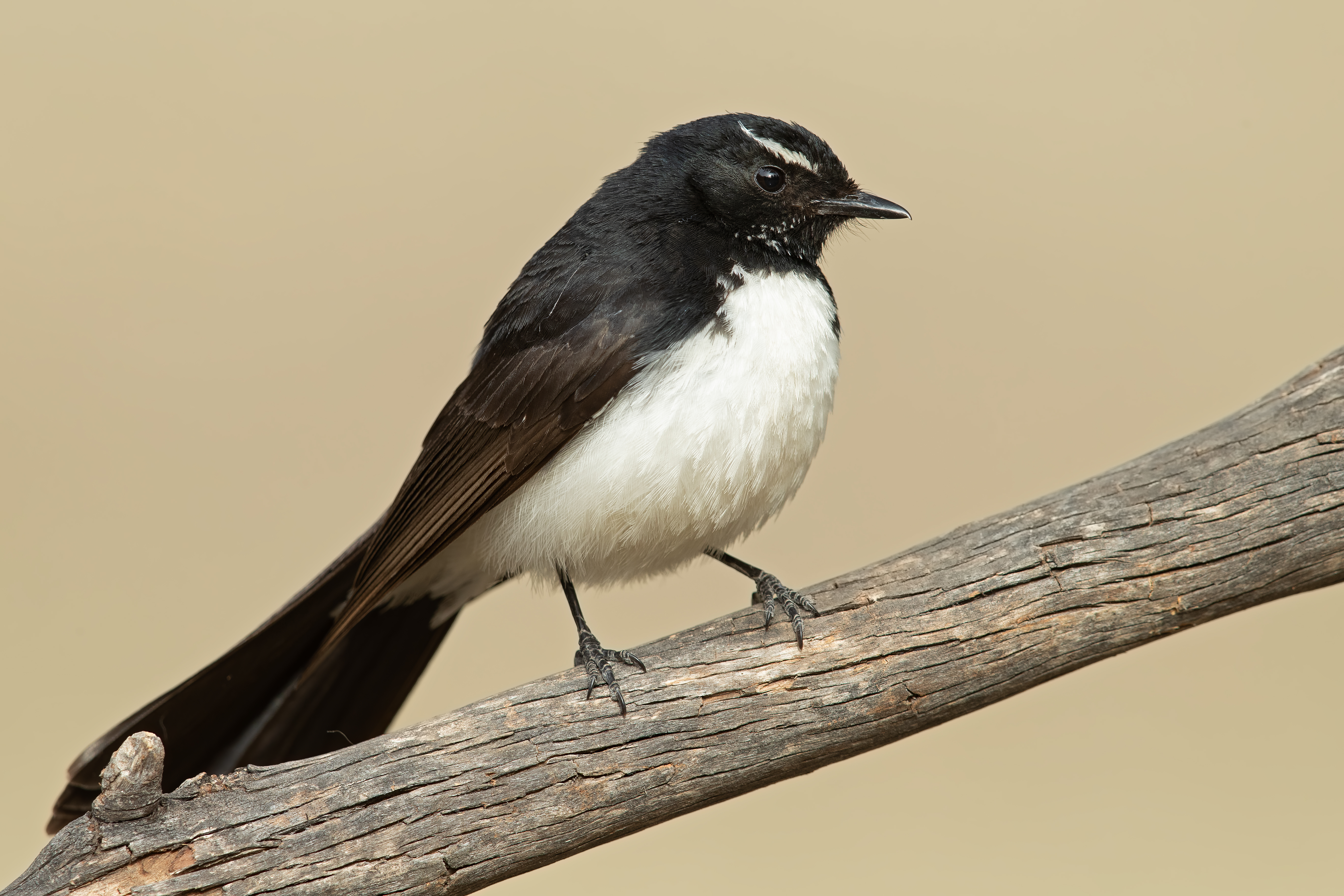
- In the Glen Davis, New South Wales, Australia.

Conservation status
- Least Concern (IUCN 3.1)

Scientific classification
- Kingdom: Animalia
- Phylum: Chordata
- Class: Aves
- Order: Passeriformes
- Family: Rhipiduridae
- Genus: Rhipidura
- Species: R. leucophrys

Binomial name
- Rhipidura leucophrys (Latham, 1801)

Subspecies
- R. l. leucophrys R. l. melaleuca R. l. picata
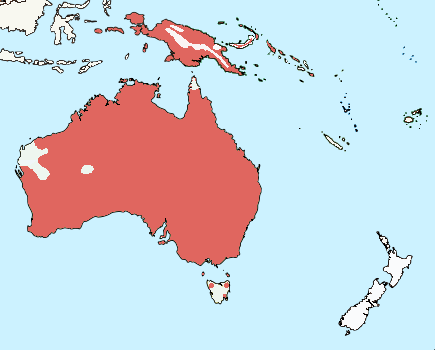
- Willie wagtail range

= Willie wagtail =

Species of bird

The willie wagtail (Rhipidura leucophrys) (also spelt willy wagtail) is a passerine bird native to Australia, New Guinea, the Solomon Islands, the Bismarck Archipelago, and Eastern Indonesia. It is a common and familiar bird throughout much of its range, living in most habitats apart from thick forest. Measuring 19–21.5 cm (7 1/2–8 1/2 in) in length, the willie wagtail is contrastingly coloured with almost entirely black upperparts and white underparts; the male and female have similar plumage.

Three subspecies are recognised; Rhipidura leucophrys leucophrys from central and southern Australia, the smaller R. l. picata from northern Australia, and the larger R. l. melaleuca from New Guinea and islands in its vicinity. It is unrelated to the true wagtails of the genus Motacilla; it is a member of the fantail genus Rhipidura and is a part of a "core corvine" group that includes true crows and ravens, drongos and birds of paradise. Within this group, fantails are placed either in the family Dicruridae, alongside drongos, or in their own small family, Rhipiduridae.

The willie wagtail is insectivorous and spends much time chasing prey in open habitat. Its common name is derived from its habit of wagging its tail horizontally when foraging on the ground. Aggressive and territorial, the willie wagtail will often harass much larger birds such as the laughing kookaburra and wedge-tailed eagle. It has responded well to human alteration of the landscape and is a common sight in urban lawns, parks, and gardens. It is widely featured in Aboriginal folklore around Australia and New Guinea in a variety of roles, from stealer of secrets and liar to a good omen for successful crops.

== Taxonomy and etymology ==
The willie wagtail was first described by the English ornithologist John Latham in 1801 as Turdus leucophrys. Its specific epithet is derived from the Ancient Greek words leukos "white" and ǒphrys "eyebrow". Other early scientific names include Muscicapa tricolor by Louis Pierre Vieillot, and Rhipidura motacilloides by naturalists Nicholas Aylward Vigors and Thomas Horsfield in 1827, who erected the genus Rhipidura. The generic term is derived from the Ancient Greek rhipis "fan" and oura "tail".

John Gould and other early writers referred to the species as the black-and-white fantail, although did note the current name. However, willie wagtail rapidly became widely accepted sometime after 1916. Wagtail is derived from its active behaviour, while the origins of willie are obscure. The name had been in use colloquially for the pied subspecies of the white wagtail (Motacilla alba) on the Isle of Man, and Northern Ireland.

Other vernacular names applied include shepherd's companion (because it accompanied livestock), frogbird, morning bird, and Australian nightingale. Many Aboriginal names are onomatopoeic, based on the sound of its scolding call. Djididjidi is a name from the South West (Noongar) region of Western Australia, and djikirridj-djikirridj is used by the Kunwinjku of western Arnhem Land. The Gamilaraay and Yuwaalaraay people of northern New South Wales use the name dhirridhirri or dhirriirii, though these names have also come to mean "troublemaker" or "nosey person".

In Central Australia, southwest of Alice Springs, the Pitjantjatjara word is tjintir-tjintir(pa). In Bougainville Island, it is called tsiropen in the Banoni language from the west coast, and in Awaipa of Kieta district it is maneka. In the Solomon Islands Pijin it is sometimes called the polis (police) or pris (priest) bird, because of its black-and-white colouring.

The willie wagtail is unrelated to the Eurasian wagtails of the family Motacillidae. It is one of 47 members of the fantail genus Rhipidura; some authorities classify this group of birds as a subfamily Rhipidurinae within the drongo family Dicruridae, together with the monarch flycatchers, while others consider them distinct enough to warrant their own family Rhipiduridae. Early molecular research in the late 1980s and early 1990s revealed that the fantails belong to a large group of mainly Australasian birds known as the parvorder Corvida comprising many tropical and Australian passerines. More recently, the grouping has been refined somewhat and the fantails have been classified in a "core corvine" group with the crows and ravens, shrikes, birds of paradise, monarch flycatchers, drongos and mudnest builders.

=== Subspecies ===
The following three subspecies are widely recognised:

- R. leucophrys leucophrys, the nominate subspecies, is the most widely distributed form found in Australia. The description below refers to it. There is negligible variation within this form, and little between the three; all have very similar plumage.
- R. leucophrys picata was described by John Gould in 1848. It is found across northern Australia, from northern Western Australia to Queensland. It has shorter wings, and it has a gradient in wing length between latitudes 18 and 22°S across the Australian continent where this subspecies intergrades with leucophrys. The subspecific epithet is Latin pǐcata "smeared with pitch".
- R. leucophrys melaleuca was described by French naturalists Jean René Constant Quoy and Joseph Paul Gaimard in 1830. It occurs in eastern Indonesia, New Guinea, the Solomon Islands and the Bismarck Archipelago. It is significantly larger, with longer bristles and larger bill. Its subspecific name is derived from the Ancient Greek melas "black", and leukos "white".

== Description ==
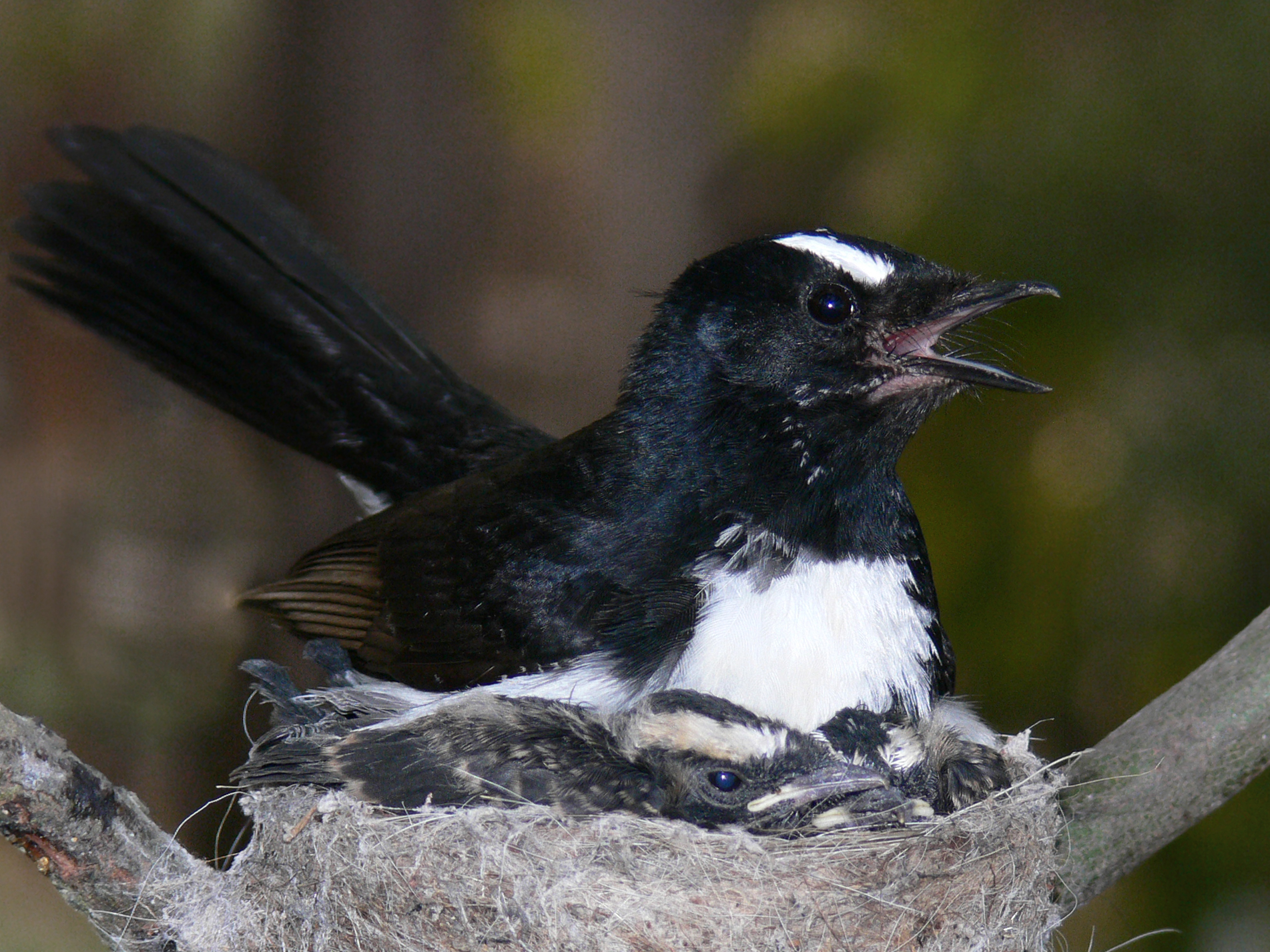
A closeup showing white eyebrows flared

An adult willie wagtail is between 19 and 21.5 cm (7.5 and 8.5 in) in length and weighs 17–24 g (0.6–0.85 oz), with a tail 10–11 cm (approx 4 in) long. The short, slender bill measures 1.64–1.93 cm (around 0.75 in), and is tipped with a small hook. This species has longer legs than other fantails, which may be an adaptation to foraging on the ground.

The male and female have similar plumage; the head, throat, upper breast, wings, upperparts, and tail are all black, with a white eyebrow, "whiskers" and underparts. The bill and legs are black and the iris dark brown. Immature birds in their first year after moulting from juvenile plumage may have pale tips in their wings. Juvenile birds have duller plumage, their upperparts brown-tinged with some pale brown scallops on the head and breast.

=== Vocalisation ===
The wagtail is very "chatty" and has a number of distinct vocalisations. Its most-recognised sound is its alarm call which is a rapid chit-chit-chit-chit, although it has more melodious sounds in its repertoire. The alarm call is sounded to warn off potential rivals and threats from its territory and also seems to serve as a signal to its mate when a potential threat is in the area. John Gould reported that it sounded like a child's rattle or "small cog-wheels of a steam mill". In his book What Bird is That? (1935), Neville Cayley writes that it has "a pleasant call resembling sweet pretty little creature, frequently uttered during the day or night, especially on moonlight nights".

== Distribution and habitat ==
Rhipidura leucophrys clip

Widespread and abundant, the willie wagtail is found across most of Australia and New Guinea, the Solomon Islands, the Bismarck Archipelago, and eastern Indonesia. It is sedentary across most of Australia. Some areas have recorded seasonal movements; it is an autumn and winter visitor to northeastern New South Wales and southeast Queensland, and the Gulf Country and parts of Cape York Peninsula in the far north. It is a vagrant to Tasmania, and on occasion reaches Lord Howe Island. There is one record from Mangere Island in the Chatham Islands archipelago east of New Zealand in 2002. The willie wagtail was released in Hawaii around 1922 to control insects on livestock, but the introduction was unsuccessful and the last sighting was at Koko Head in 1937.

The willie wagtail is at home in a wide variety of habitats, but avoids densely forested areas such as rainforest. It prefers semi-open woodland or grassland with scattered trees, often near wetlands or bodies of water. In New Guinea, it inhabits man-made clearings and grasslands, as well as open forest and mangroves. On Guadalcanal, it was reported from open areas and coconut groves.

It has responded well to human alteration of the landscape and can often be seen hunting in open, grassed areas such as lawns, gardens, parkland, and sporting grounds. The species spread into the Western Australian Wheatbelt after the original vegetation had been cleared for agriculture.

== Behaviour ==
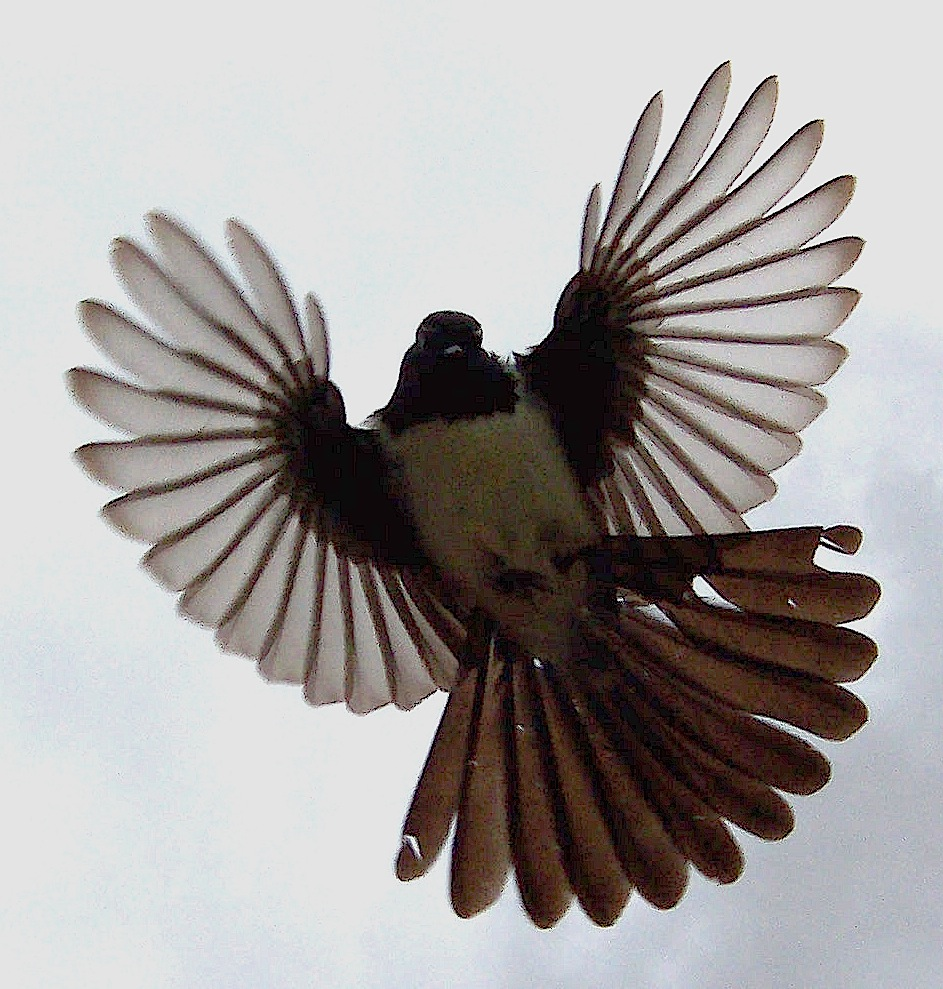
In flight

The willie wagtail is almost always on the move and rarely still for more than a few moments during daylight hours. Even while perching it will flick its tail from side to side, twisting about looking for prey. Birds are mostly encountered singly or in pairs, although they may gather in small flocks. Unlike other fantails, much of its time is spent on the ground. It beats its wings deeply in flight, interspersed with a swift flying dip. It characteristically wags its tail upon landing after a short dipping flight.

The willie wagtail is highly territorial and can be quite fearless in defence of its territory; it will harass not only small birds but also much larger species such as the Australian magpie (Gymnorhina tibicen), raven (Corvus coronoides), laughing kookaburra (Dacelo novaeguineae), and wedge-tailed eagle (Aquila audax). It may even attack domestic dogs, cats and humans which approach its nest too closely. It has also been observed harassing snake-neck turtles and tiger snakes in Western Australia.

When harassing an opponent, the willie wagtail avoids the head and aims for the rear. Both the male and female may engage in this behaviour, and generally more intensely in the breeding season. Territories range from 1–3 ha (2.5–7.4 acres) in area. A pair of birds will declare and defend their territory against other pairs in a diving display. One bird remains still while the other loops and dives repeatedly before the roles are reversed; both sing all the while.

The bird's white eyebrows become flared and more prominent in an aggressive display, and settled and more hidden when in a submissive or appeasement display.

=== Breeding ===
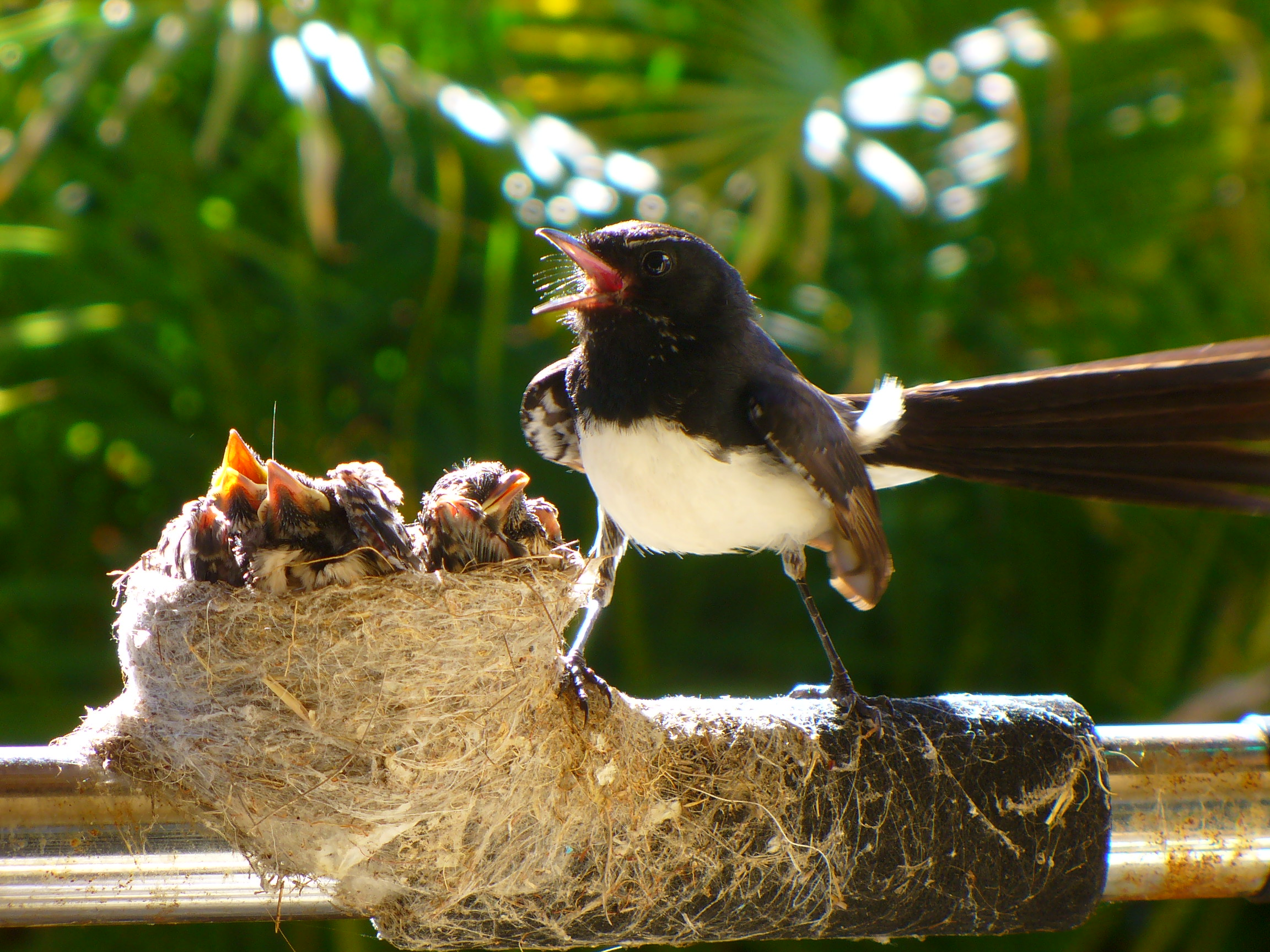
A well-guarded nest

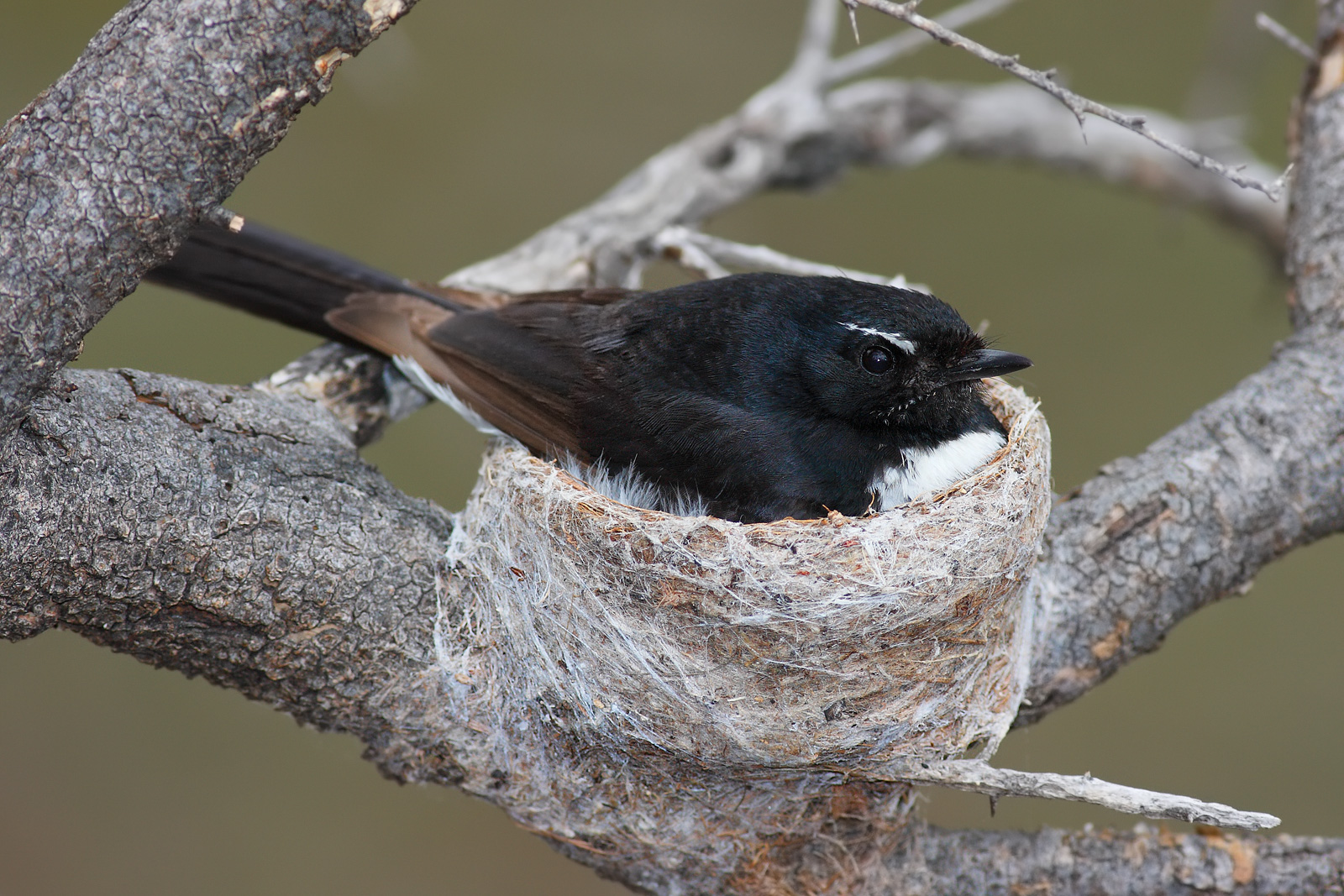
A willie wagtail incubating its eggs

Willie wagtails usually pair for life. The breeding season lasts from July to December, more often occurring after rain in drier regions. Anywhere up to four broods may be raised during this time. It builds a cup-like nest on a tree branch away from leaves or cover, less than 5 m (16 ft) above the ground. Rafters and eaves may also be used. It has been observed to build its nest in the vicinity of those of the magpie-lark (Grallina cyanoleuca), possibly taking advantage of the latter bird's territoriality and aggression toward intruders. Similarly, it is not afraid to build near human habitation.

The nest consists of grass stems, strips of bark, and other fibrous material which is bound and woven together with spider web. Even hair from pet dogs and cats may be used. It has also been observed attempting to take hair from a pet goat. An alpaca breeder in the Mudgee District of New South Wales has observed alpaca fleece in the nests of willy wagtails, the results of scraps of fleece not picked up at shearing time. The female lays two to four small cream-white eggs with brownish markings measuring 16 mm × 21 mm (0.63 in × 0.83 in), and incubates them for 14 days.

Like all passerines, the chicks are altricial and nidicolous; they are born naked and helpless with closed eyes, and remain in the nest. Both parents take part in feeding the young, and may continue to do so while embarking on another brood. Nestlings remain in the nest for around 14 days before fledging.

Upon leaving, the fledglings remain hidden in cover nearby for one or two days before venturing further afield, up to 20 m (66 ft) away by the third day. Parents will stop feeding their fledglings near the end of the second week, as the young birds increasingly forage for themselves, and soon afterwards drive them out of the territory.

The female pallid cuckoo (Cuculus pallidus) will lay eggs in a willie wagtail nest, although the hosts often recognise and eject the foreign eggs, so successful brood parasitism is rare. Parasitism by the fan-tailed (Cacomantis flabelliformis), brush, (C. variolosus), Horsfield's bronze (Chrysococcyx basalis), and shining bronze cuckoo (C. lucidus) has also been reported.

Although the willie wagtail is an aggressive defender of its nest, predators do account for many eggs and young. About two thirds of eggs hatch successfully, and a third leave the nest as fledglings. Nestlings may be preyed upon by both pied butcherbirds, (Cracticus nigrogularis) black butcherbirds (C. quoyi), the spangled drongo (Dicrurus bracteatus), and the pied currawong (Strepera graculina), as well as the feral cat (Felis catus), and rat species. The proximity of nesting to human habitation has also left nests open to destruction by children. Mostly male willie wagtails sing at night only during breeding season. The song rate increases with lunar illumination.

=== Feeding ===
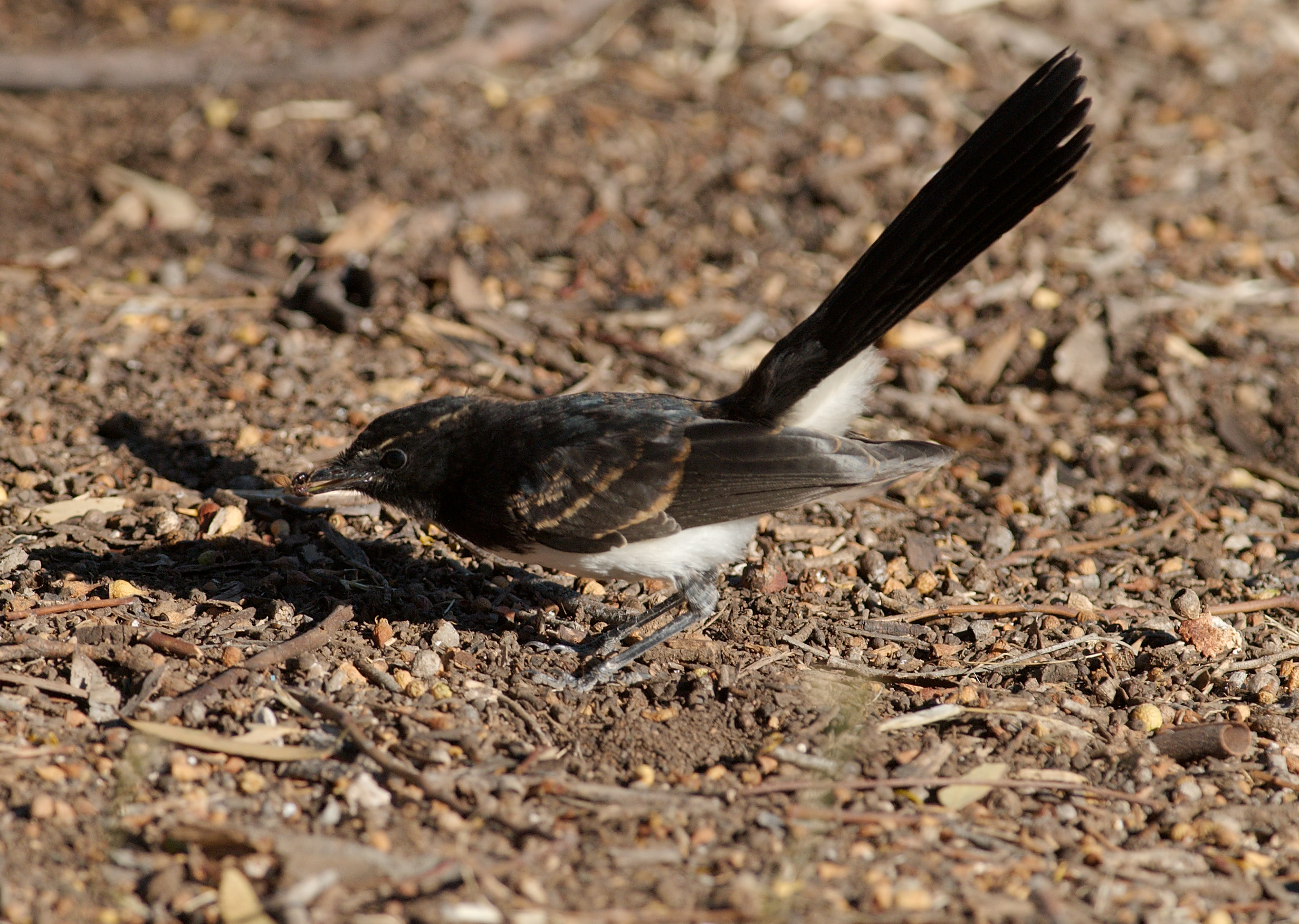
A juvenile successfully foraging

The willie wagtail perches on low branches, fences, posts, and the like, watching for insects and other small invertebrates in the air or on the ground. It usually hunts by hawking flying insects such as gnats, flies, and small moths, but will occasionally glean from the ground. It will often hop along the ground and flit behind people and animals, such as cattle, sheep or horses, as they walk over grassed areas, to catch any creatures disturbed by their passing.

It wags its tail in a horizontal fashion while foraging in this manner; the exact purpose of this behaviour is unknown but is thought to help flush out insects hidden in vegetation and hence make them easier to catch. The willie wagtail takes ticks from the skin of grazing animals such as cattle or pigs, even from lions asleep in a zoo. It kills its prey by bashing it against a hard surface, or holding it and pulling off the wings before extracting the edible insides.

The adaptability and opportunistic diet of the willie wagtail have probably assisted it in adapting to human habitation; it eats a wide variety of arthropods, including butterflies, moths, flies, beetles, dragonflies, bugs, spiders, centipedes, and millipedes, and has been recorded killing small lizards such as skinks and geckos in a study in Madang on Papua New Guinea's north coast. The tailbones of these lizards have been found in their faeces, although it is unclear whether the whole animal was eaten or merely the tail. Either way, lizards are only a very occasional prey item forming between 1 and 3% of the total diet. Evidence from the study in Madang suggested that the willie wagtail selectively fed nestlings larger prey.

== Cultural depictions ==
Willy Wagtail
English Fiddle Song
Audio 00:02:14

The willie wagtail was a feature in Australian Aboriginal folklore. Aboriginal tribes in parts of southeastern Australia, such as the Ngarrindjeri of the Lower Murray River, and the Narrunga People of the Yorke Peninsula, regard the willie wagtail as the bearer of bad news. It was thought that the willie wagtail could steal a person's secrets while lingering around camps eavesdropping, so women would be tight-lipped in the presence of the bird. The people of the Kimberley held a similar belief that it would inform the spirit of the recently departed if living relatives spoke badly of them. They also venerated the willie wagtail as the most intelligent of all animals.

Its cleverness is also seen in a Tinputz tale of Bougainville Island, where Singsing Tongereng (Willie Wagtail) wins a contest among all birds to see who can fly the highest, by riding on the back of the eagle. The Kunwinjku in western Arnhem Land took a dimmer view and regarded it as a liar and a tattletale. The willie wagtail was held to have stolen fire and tried to extinguish it in the sea in a dreaming story of the Yindjibarndi people of the central and western Pilbara, and was able to send a strong wind if frightened. In the Noongar language dialects, the willie wagtail is known as the Djiti-Djiti (pronounced Chitti-chitti) and the Willaring in the Perth region.

The Kalam people of New Guinea highlands called it konmayd, and deemed it a good bird; if it came and chattered when a new garden was tilled, then there would be good crops. It is said to be taking care of pigs if it is darting and calling around them. It may also be the manifestation of the ghost of paternal relatives to the Kalam. Called the kuritoro bird in New Guinea's eastern highlands, its appearance was significant in the mourning ceremony by a widow for her dead husband. She would offer him banana flowers; the presence of the bird singing nearby would confirm that the dead man's soul had taken the offering.

A tale from the Kieta district of Bougainville Island relates that a maneka, the willie wagtail, darting along a river bank echoes a legendary daughter looking for her mother who drowned trying to cross a flooding river in a storm. The bird has been depicted on postage stamps in Palau and the Solomon Islands, and has also appeared as a character in Australian children's literature, such as Dot and the Kangaroo (1899), Blinky Bill Grows Up (1935), and Willie Wagtail and Other Tales (1929).

== See also ==
- Birds of Australia
- Fauna of Australia
