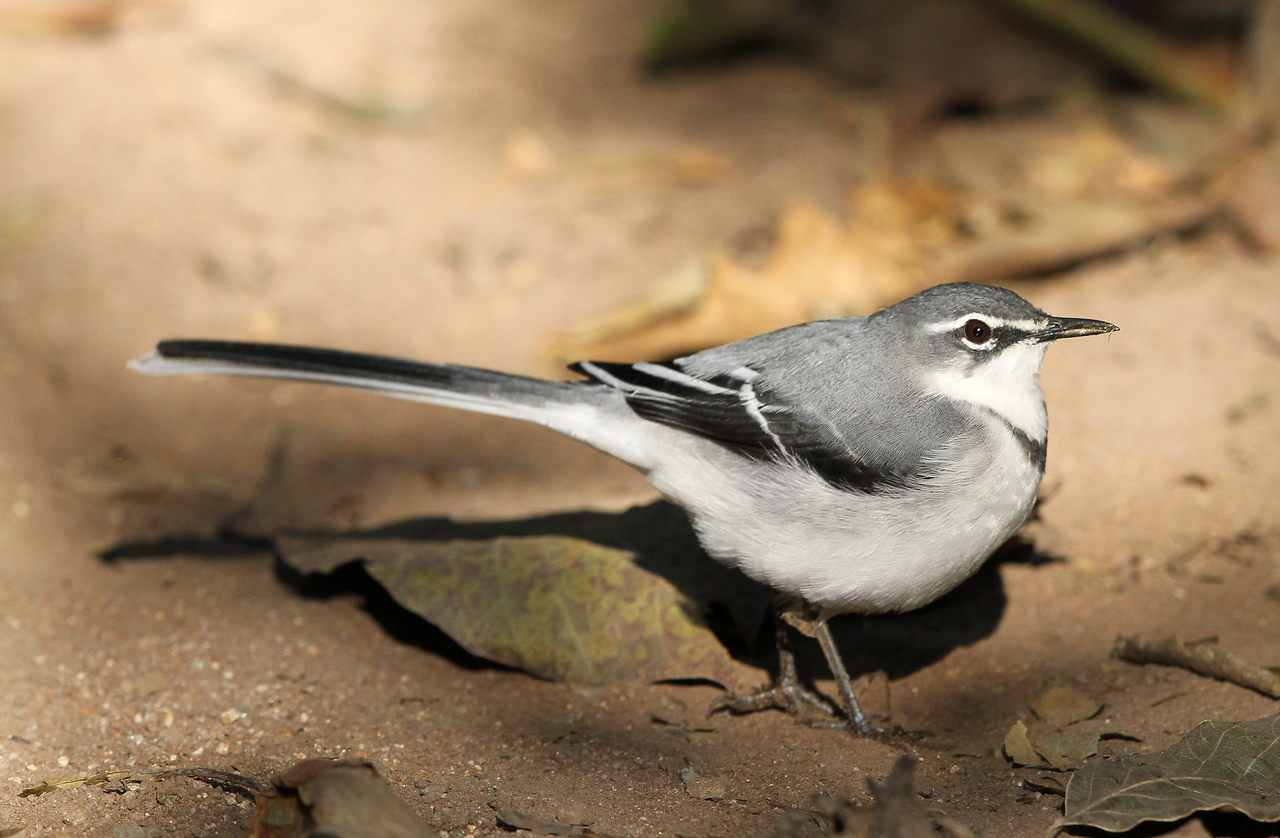

Conservation status
- Least Concern (IUCN 3.1)

Scientific classification
- Kingdom: Animalia
- Phylum: Chordata
- Class: Aves
- Order: Passeriformes
- Family: Motacillidae
- Genus: Motacilla
- Species: M. clara

Binomial name
- Motacilla clara Sharpe, 1908

= Mountain wagtail =

Species of bird

The mountain wagtail (Motacilla clara), also known as the long-tailed wagtail or grey-backed wagtail, is a species of wagtail of the family Motacillidae from sub-Saharan Africa.

== Description ==
A slender, long tailed wagtail with light bluish grey upperparts and white underparts with a narrow black breast band. The wings are black with white feather edges and two white wing covert bars. The outer tail is white and the tail centre is black. The face is blackish broken up with a white supercilium and the eyelid. Juveniles are browner than adults.

== Distribution ==
The mountain wagtail occurs in the Afromontane, from Guinea to Ethiopia south to South Africa. In southern Africa it is locally common in the north and eastern highlands of Zimbabwe and adjoining parts of Mozambique, southwards to the Eastern Cape.

== Habitat ==
The mountain wagtail normally prefers small rivers and streams in hill country, especially stretches where there are waterfalls and flat rocks immersed in shallow water and where hill slopes are clothed in forest, woodland or dense scrub. It may also be seen along forest paths, tracks and roads and occasionally in gardens.

== Biology ==
The mountain wagtail is mainly insectivorous, catching mainly flies with most of its foraging conducted along watercourses, where it searches for prey on rocks, in sand and in shallow water. They have also been recorded eating caddis flies, mayflies (both adults) and nymphs, dragonflies and damselflies, butterflies and moths, beetles, grubs, slugs and tadpoles.

It is a monogamous, territorial solitary nester where the male and female usually pair for life. Both sexes build the nest which consists of a bulky cup lined with root fibres, plant stalks and fibrous tissues, resting on a foundation of material moistened by water then set to dry. The nest is usually situated in a cavity in the stream bank, on a boulder, rock face or wall of a dam. Sometimes the nest is placed in plant debris caught in a branch over water, a tree near a deep pool or occasionally in man-made structures, such as bridges or buildings. In southern Africa the eggs are laid from August–May, with a peak during September–December. 1-4 eggs are laid and these are incubated by both sexes for 13–14 days, the male and the female alternate incubation in shifts of 15–60 minutes. The nestlings are fed by both parents and brooded constantly for the first 3–4 days or so of their lives, after which brooding becomes less frequent and totally stops when they reach 6–8 days old. The young fledge at 14–18 days old and remain in their parents' territory for between 19 and 48 days.

== Subspecies ==
Three subspecies of the mountain wagtail are currently recognised.

- Motacilla clara clara: Ethiopia
- Motacilla clara chapini: Sierra Leone to Gabon, Democratic Republic of the Congo and western Uganda
- Motacilla clara torrentium: Eastern Uganda to Kenya, Rwanda, Angola and South Africa
