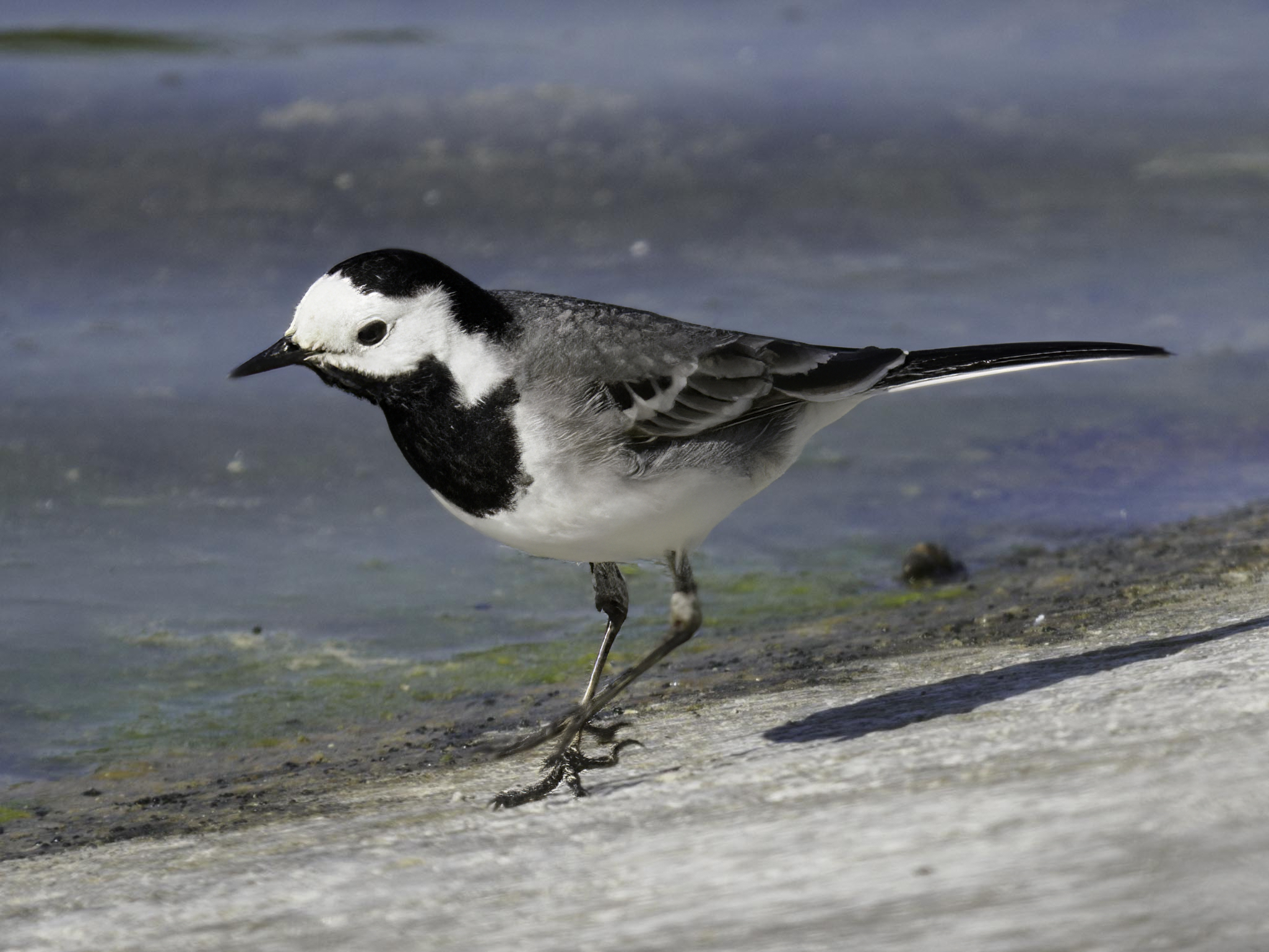
- White wagtail (Motacilla alba) in Stockholm, Sweden

Scientific classification
- Kingdom: Animalia
- Phylum: Chordata
- Class: Aves
- Order: Passeriformes
- Family: Motacillidae
- Genus: Motacilla; Linnaeus, 1758

Type species
- Motacilla alba Linnaeus, 1758

Species
- Many, see text

= Wagtail =

Wagtails

Genus of birds

Wagtails are a group of passerine birds that form the genus Motacilla in the family Motacillidae. The common name and genus name are derived from their characteristic tail pumping behaviour. Together with the pipits and longclaws they form the family Motacillidae.

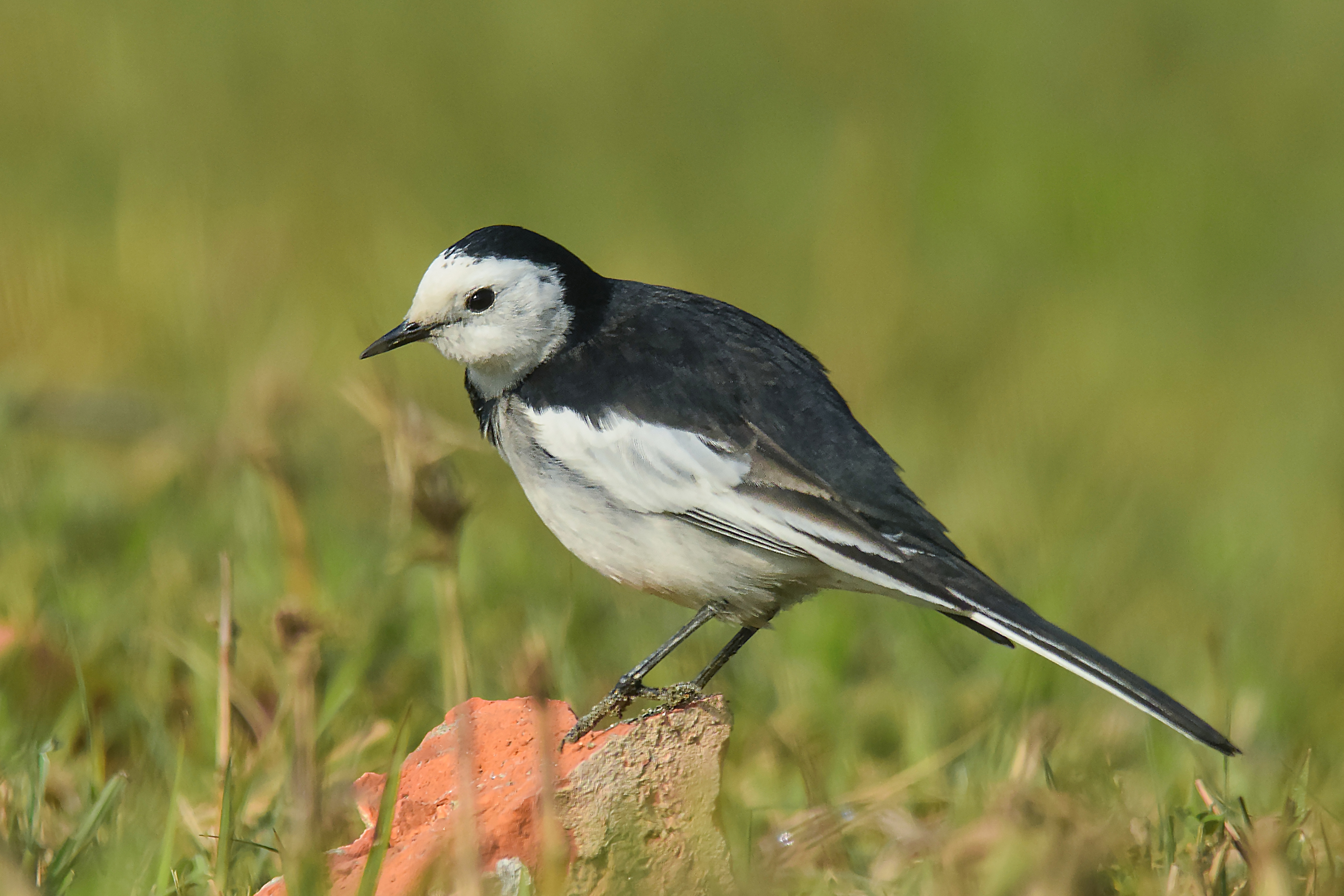
Wagtail in Dhaka, Bangladesh

The forest wagtail belongs to the monotypic genus Dendronanthus which is closely related to Motacilla and sometimes included therein.

The willie wagtail (Rhipidura leucophrys) of Australia is not a true wagtail; it was named as such by early settlers from England from its superficial similarity in colour and behaviour to the pied wagtail, but belongs to an unrelated genus of birds known as fantails.

== Taxonomy ==
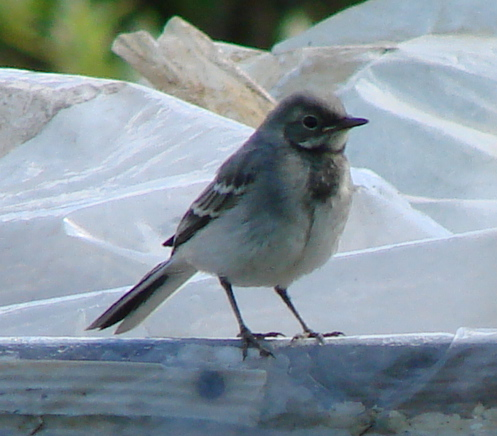
Young white wagtail

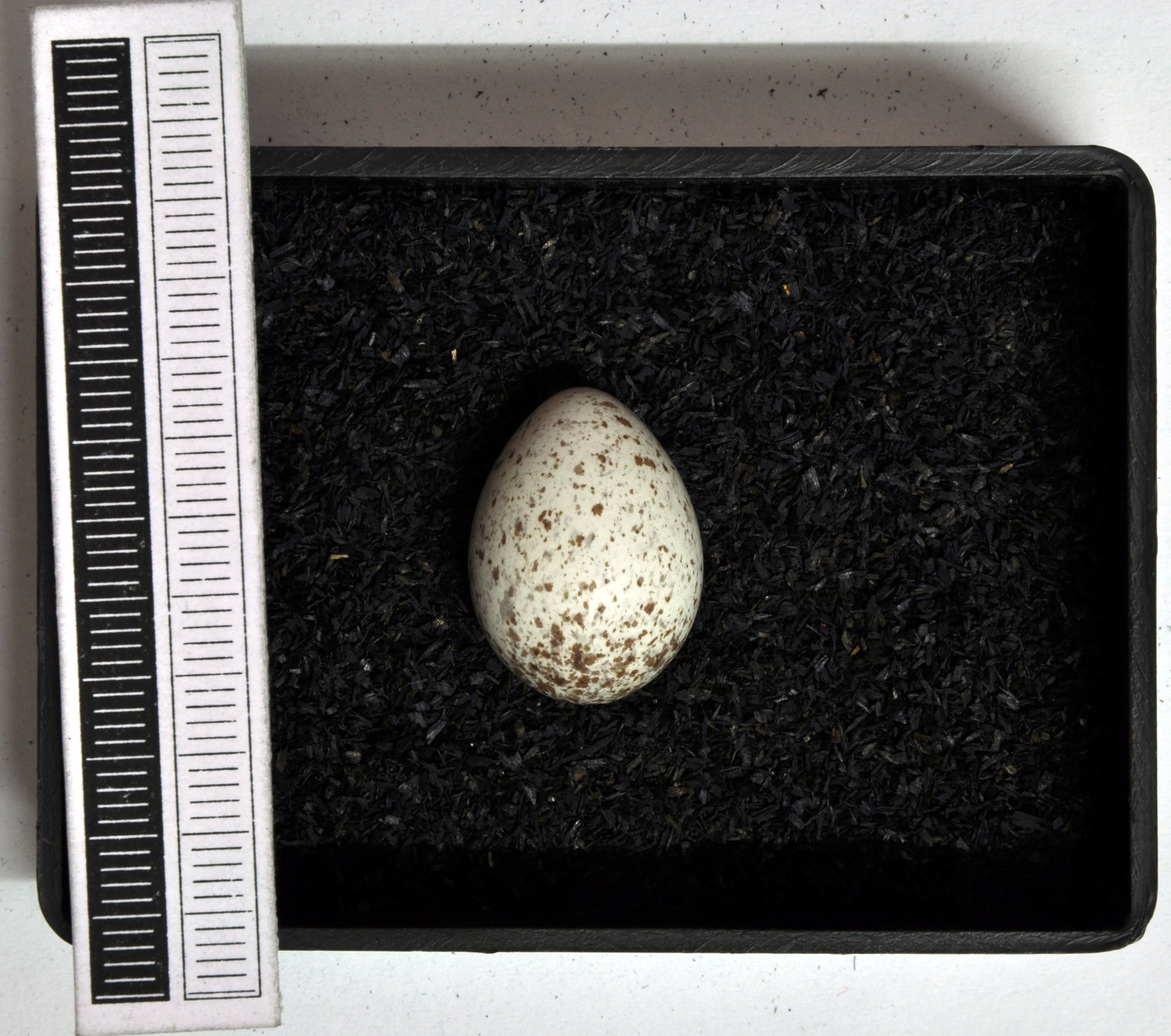
Egg, Collection Museum Wiesbaden, Germany

The genus Motacilla was described by the Swedish naturalist Carl Linnaeus in 1758 in the tenth edition of his Systema Naturae. The type species is the white wagtail. Motacilla is the Latin name for the pied wagtail; although actually a diminutive of motare, "to move about", from medieval times it led to the misunderstanding of cilla as "tail".

At first glance, the wagtails appear to be divided into a yellow-bellied group and a white-bellied one, or one where the upper head is black and another where it is usually grey, but may be olive, yellow, or other colours. However, these are not evolutionary lineages; change of belly colour and increase of melanin have occurred independently several times in the wagtails, and the colour patterns which actually indicate relationships are more subtle.

mtDNA cytochrome b and NADH dehydrogenase subunit 2 sequence data (Voelker, 2002) is of limited use: the suspicion that there is a superspecies of probably three white-bellied, black-throated wagtails is confirmed. Also, there is another superspecies in sub-Saharan Africa, three white-throated species with a black breast-band. The remaining five species are highly variable morphologically and their relationships with each other and with the two clades have not yet been satisfactorily explained.

The origin of the genus appears to be in the general area of Eastern Siberia/Mongolia. Wagtails spread rapidly across Eurasia and dispersed to Africa in the Zanclean (Early Pliocene) where the sub-Saharan lineage was later isolated. The African pied wagtail (and possibly the Mekong wagtail) diverged prior to the massive radiation of the white-bellied black-throated and most yellow-bellied forms, all of which took place during the late Piacenzian (early Late Pliocene), c. 3 mya.

Three species are poly- or paraphyletic in the present taxonomical arrangement, and either subspecies need to be reassigned and/or species split up. The western yellow wagtail in particular has a convulted taxonomical history, with ten currently accepted subspecies and many more invalid ones. The two remaining "monochrome" species, Mekong and African pied wagtail may be closely related, or a most striking example of convergent evolution.

Prehistoric wagtails known from fossils are Motacilla humata and Motacilla major.

== Characteristics ==
Wagtails are slender, often colourful, ground-feeding insectivores of open country in the Old World. Species of wagtail breed in Africa, Europe and Asia, some of which are fully or partially migratory. Two species also breed in western Alaska, and wintering birds may reach Australia.

When wagtails from European locations such as the UK, Belgium, the Netherlands, and Luxembourg migrate south for the winter, they usually fly over France, and Spain in order to arrive at Africa via Morocco. When they come from further east in Europe, such as Finland, Poland, Kazakhstan, and Sweden, they pass into Africa via a more eastern route, such as Israel. Indeed, since it is a grueling flight and some wagtails unfortunately die during the migration, many who arrive simply choose to remain there. They also fly over other Middle Eastern countries on their journey to Afric, such as the Arabian Peninsula and Egypt.

They are ground nesters, often in rock crevices on steep banks or walls, laying (3–)4–6(–8) speckled eggs at a time. Among their most conspicuous behaviours is a near constant tail wagging, a trait that has given the birds their common name. In spite of the ubiquity of the behaviour and observations of it, the reasons for it are poorly understood. It has been suggested that it may flush up prey, or that it may signal submissiveness to other wagtails. Recent studies have suggested instead that it is a signal of vigilance that may aid to deter potential predators.

=== Cultural Symbolism ===
In Ancient Greece, they symbolized love, and were a present from the goddess Aphrodite. In some cultures, it is seen as forecasting oncoming rain. In Chinese culture, they symbolize one's siblings.

== Species list ==
The genus contains the following thirteen species.

| Image | Scientific name | Common name | Distribution |
|---|---|---|---|
| | Motacilla flava | Western yellow wagtail | Temperate to subarctic Europe and western Asia; wintering in tropical Africa and southern Asia. |
| | Motacilla tschutschensis | Eastern yellow wagtail | Temperate to subarctic eastern Asia, also in Alaska in North America; wintering southern Asia and northern Australia. |
| | Motacilla citreola | Citrine wagtail | Temperate eastern Europe, western and central Asia; wintering southern Asia. |
| | Motacilla capensis | Cape wagtail | Southern Africa from Uganda, the eastern DRCongo and Kenya, through Zambia and Angola to southern Africa, south to the Western Cape; non-migratory. |
| | Motacilla flaviventris | Madagascar wagtail | Madagascar; endemic, non-migratory. |
| | Motacilla bocagii (formerly Amaurocichla bocagii) | São Tomé shorttail | São Tomé; endemic, non-migratory. |
| | Motacilla cinerea | Grey wagtail | Western Europe including the British Isles, southern Scandinavia, the Mediterranean region, and Macaronesia; also disjunct in temperate central and eastern Asia east to Kamchatka, and also the Himalaya to the Tien Shan. European populations largely resident or short-distance migrants; Asian populations migrate to southern Asia in winter. |
| | Motacilla clara | Mountain wagtail | Guinea to Ethiopia south to South Africa. |
| | Motacilla alba | White wagtail | Breeds throughout Eurasia up to latitudes 75°N, only absent in the Arctic where the July isotherm is less than 4 °C. It also breeds in the mountains of Morocco and western Alaska. Short-distance migrant, wintering western and southern Europe south to north-central Africa and southern Asia. Occupies a wide range of habitats, but absent from deserts. |
| | Motacilla aguimp | African pied wagtail | Sub-Saharan Africa from the Eastern Cape north to extreme southern Egypt and from Guinea to western Eritrea and Somalia. |
| | Motacilla samveasnae | Mekong wagtail | Cambodia and Laos, largely resident, but a non-breeding visitor to nearby Thailand and Vietnam. |
| | Motacilla grandis | Japanese wagtail | Japan and Korea; non-migratory. |
| | Motacilla maderaspatensis | White-browed wagtail | India; non-migratory. |

== Sources ==
- Voelker, Gary (2002): "Systematics and historical biogeography of wagtails: Dispersal versus vicariance revisited". Condor 104(4): 725–739. [English with Spanish abstract] DOI: 10.1650/0010-5422(2002)104[0725:SAHBOW]2.0.CO;2. HTML abstract
