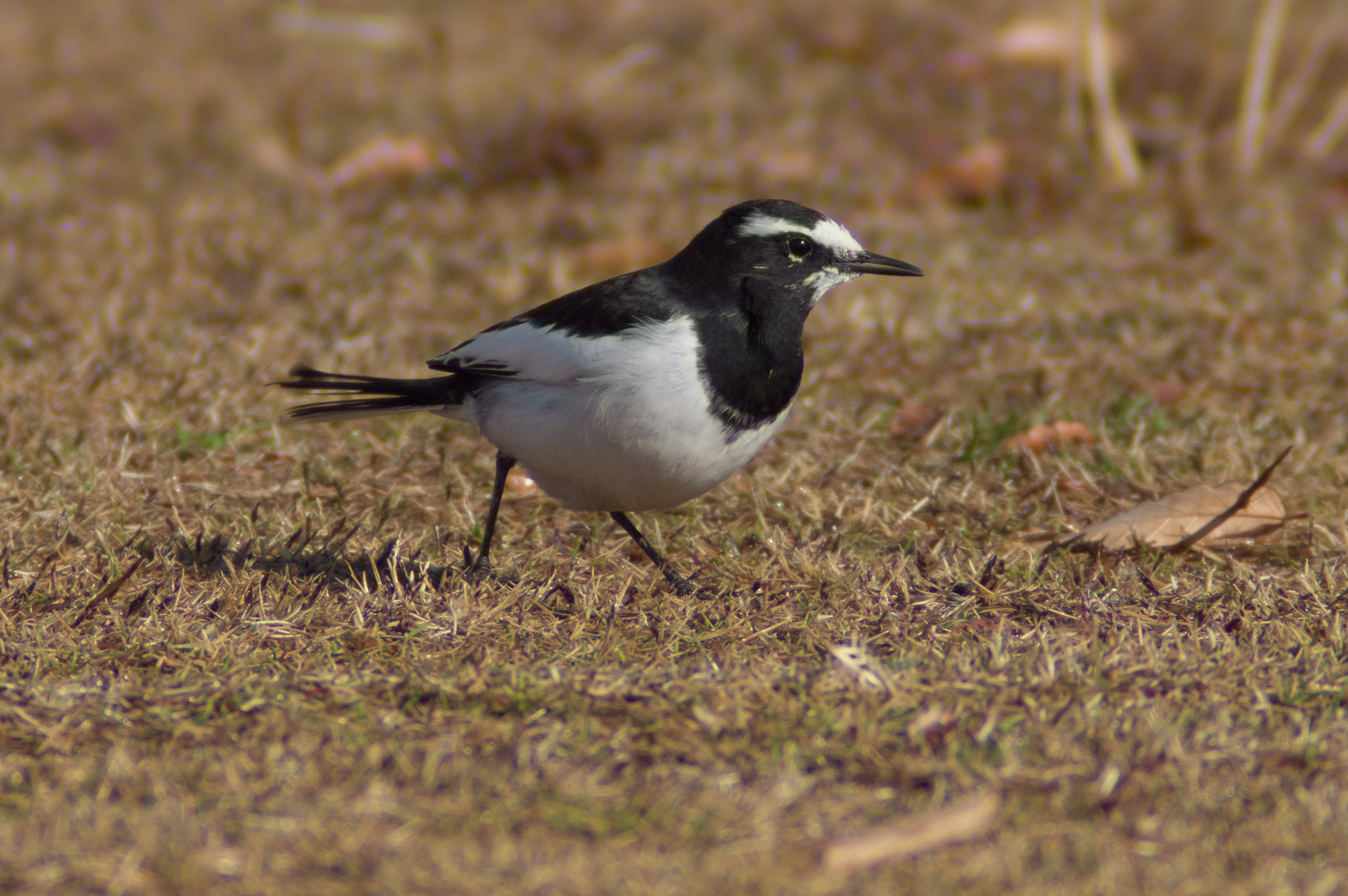
- In Japan

Conservation status
- Least Concern (IUCN 3.1)

Scientific classification
- Kingdom: Animalia
- Phylum: Chordata
- Class: Aves
- Order: Passeriformes
- Family: Motacillidae
- Genus: Motacilla
- Species: M. grandis

Binomial name
- Motacilla grandis Sharpe, 1885

= Japanese wagtail =

Species of bird

The Japanese wagtail (Motacilla grandis) is a species of bird in the pipit and wagtail family Motacillidae. It is native to Japan and Korea.

== Description ==
The Japanese wagtail is about 20 cm long. The sexes look similar; they have white underparts and black upperparts, throats, and backs. Their supercilia are also white. They have black beaks and dark grey legs and feet. The plumage of a juvenile is greyer than that of an adult.

== Taxonomy and systematics ==
The bird's Latin species name, grandis, means large.

== Conservation ==
The Japanese wagtail is classed as a species of least concern by the IUCN. It has a stable population.

== Behavior ==
=== Diet ===
The Japanese wagtail eats insects.

=== Roosting ===
Large groups of Japanese wagtails roost together in trees.

=== Breeding ===
Nests are built in cavities near water. The parents both look after the eggs and chicks. Four to six eggs are laid in each clutch.

== Distribution ==
It is native to Japan and Korea. Vagrant birds have been recorded in Taiwan, eastern China and far-eastern Russia. It lives in inland wetlands, on arable land and in urban areas.
