= List of birds of Oman =

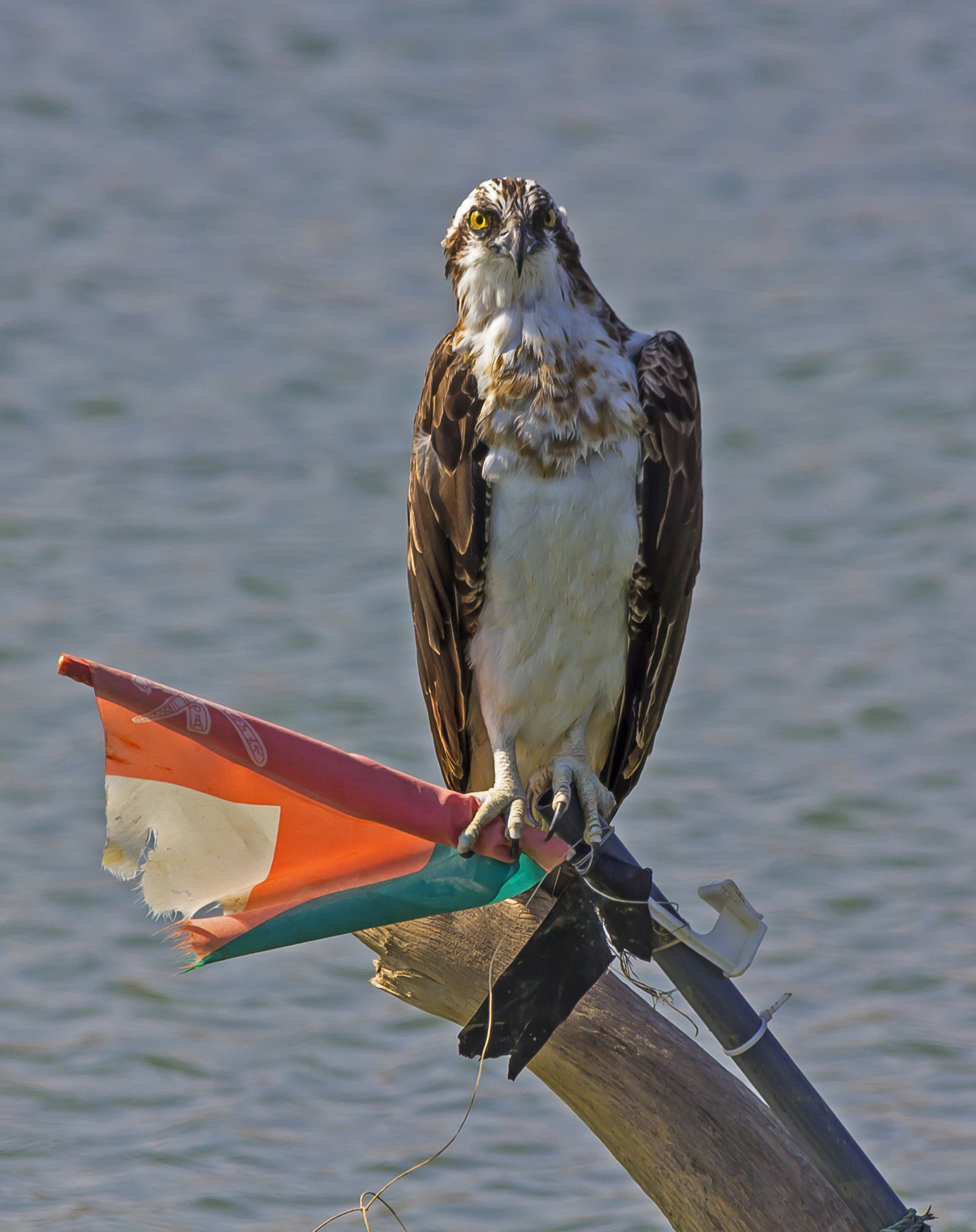
Osprey, a local breeding resident easily found near any coast of Oman. It is familiar to locals.

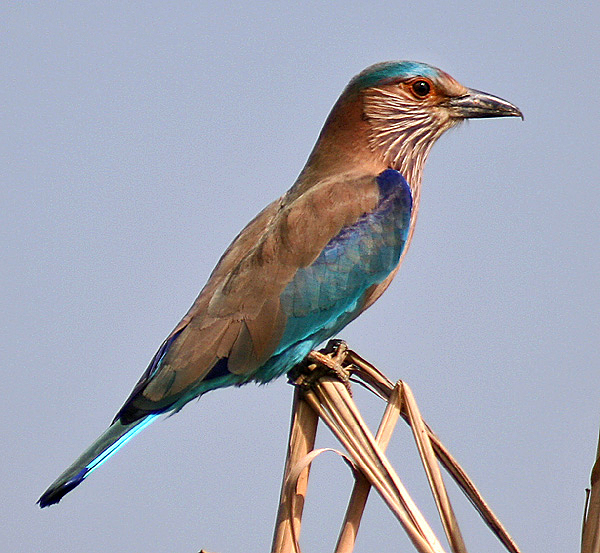
Indian roller, a common and familiar bird in northern Oman.

This is a list of the bird species recorded in Oman. The avifauna of Oman include a total of 556 species, of which 7 have been introduced by humans.

This list's taxonomic treatment (designation and sequence of orders, families and species) and nomenclature (common and scientific names) generally follow the conventions of The Clements Checklist of Birds of the World, 2022 edition with a few changes based on the list of the Ornithological Society of the Middle East. The family accounts at the beginning of each heading reflect the Clements taxonomy, as do the species counts found in each family account. Introduced and accidental species are included in the total counts for Oman.

The following tags have been used to highlight several categories, but not all species fall into one of these categories. Those that do not are commonly occurring native species.

- (A) Accidental - a species that rarely or accidentally occurs in Oman
- (I) Introduced - a species introduced to Oman as a consequence, direct or indirect, of human actions
- (Ex) Extirpated - a species that no longer occurs in Oman although populations exist elsewhere
- (X) Extinct - a species or subspecies that no longer exists

== Ostriches ==
Order: Struthioniformes Family: Struthionidae

The ostrich is a flightless bird native to Africa. It is the largest living species of bird. It is distinctive in its appearance, with a long neck and legs and the ability to run at high speeds.

- Common ostrich, Struthio camelus (Ex)
  - Arabian ostrich, Struthio camelus syriacus (X)

== Ducks, geese, and waterfowl ==
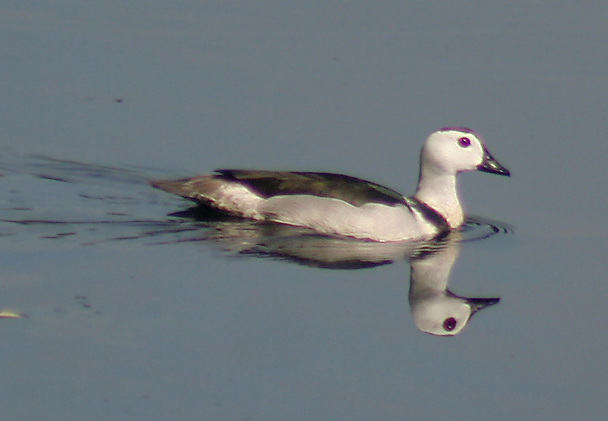
Cotton pygmy-goose, a winter visitor to the south.

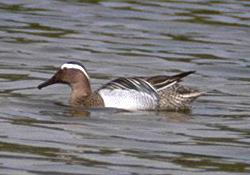
Garganey, a common migrant especially in spring and autumn.

Order: Anseriformes Family: Anatidae

Anatidae includes the ducks and most duck-like waterfowl, such as geese and swans. These birds are adapted to an aquatic existence with webbed feet, flattened bills, and feathers that are excellent at shedding water due to an oily coating.

- Fulvous whistling-duck, Dendrocygna bicolor (A)
- Lesser whistling-duck, Dendrocygna javanica (A)
- Graylag goose, Anser anser
- Greater white-fronted goose, Anser albifrons
- Lesser white-fronted goose, Anser erythropus (A)
- Canada goose, Branta canadensis (A)
- Red-breasted goose, Branta ruficollis (A)
- Mute swan, Cygnus olor (A)
- Tundra swan, Cygnus columbianus
- Whooper swan, Cygnus cygnus (A)
- Knob-billed duck, Sarkidiornis melanotos (A)
- Egyptian goose, Alopochen aegyptiacus (A)
- Ruddy shelduck, Tadorna ferruginea
- Common shelduck, Tadorna tadorna
- Cotton pygmy-goose, Nettapus coromandelianus
- Garganey, Spatula querquedula
- Northern shoveler, Spatula clypeata
- Gadwall, Mareca strepera
- Eurasian wigeon, Mareca penelope
- Mallard, Anas platyrhynchos
- Northern pintail, Anas acuta
- Green-winged teal, Anas crecca
- Marbled teal, Marmaronetta angustirostris (A)
- Red-crested pochard, Netta rufina
- Common pochard, Aythya ferina
- Ferruginous duck, Aythya nyroca
- Tufted duck, Aythya fuligula
- Red-breasted merganser, Mergus serrator (A)

== Pheasants, grouse, and allies ==
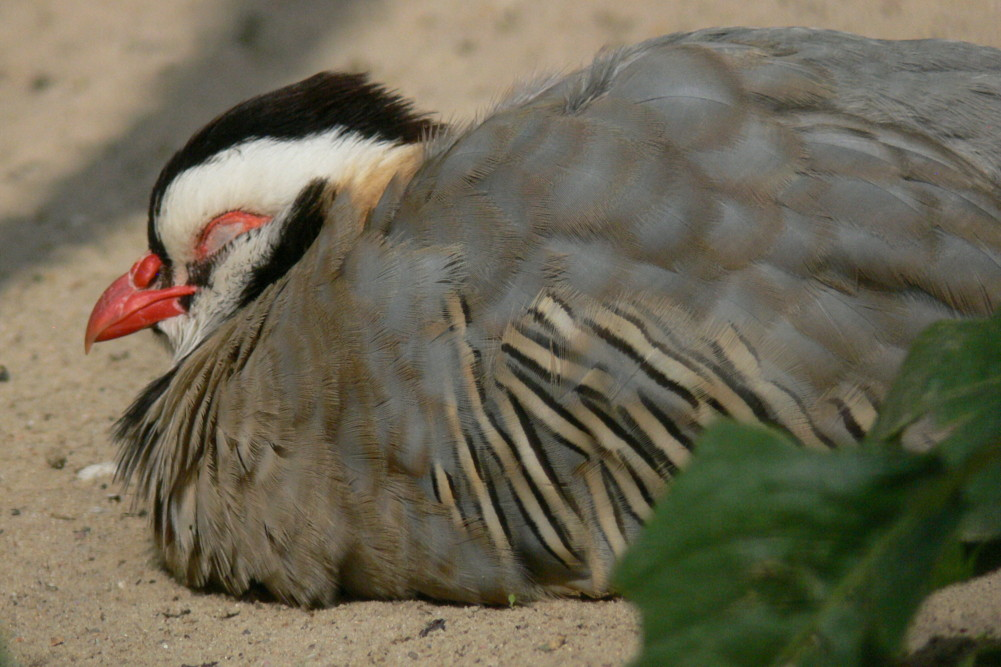
Arabian partridge, a local resident of northern and southern mountains.

Order: Galliformes Family: Phasianidae

The Phasianidae are a family of terrestrial birds. In general, they are plump (although they vary in size) and have broad, relatively short wings.

- Sand partridge, Ammoperdix heyi
- Common quail, Coturnix coturnix
- Harlequin quail, Coturnix delegorguei (A)
- Chukar, Alectoris chukar
- Arabian partridge, Alectoris melanocephala
- Gray francolin, Ortygornis pondicerianus

== Flamingos ==
Order: Phoenicopteriformes Family: Phoenicopteridae

Flamingos are gregarious wading birds, usually 3 to 5 feet (0.9 to 1.5 m) tall, found in both the Western and Eastern Hemispheres. Flamingos filter-feed on shellfish and algae. Their oddly shaped beaks are specially adapted to separate mud and silt from the food they consume and, uniquely, are used upside-down.

- Greater flamingo, Phoenicopterus roseus
- Lesser flamingo, Phoenicopterus minor (A)

== Grebes ==
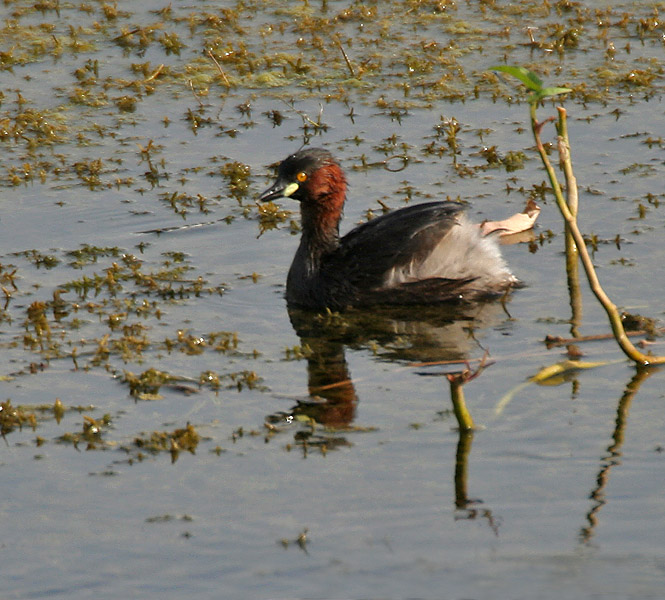
Little grebe, breeds at a few wetland sites.

Order: Podicipediformes Family: Podicipedidae

Grebes are small to medium-large freshwater diving birds. They have lobed toes and are excellent swimmers and divers. However, they have their feet placed far back on the body, making them quite ungainly on land.

- Little grebe, Tachybaptus ruficollis
- Great crested grebe, Podiceps cristatus (A)
- Eared grebe, Podiceps nigricollis

== Pigeons and doves ==
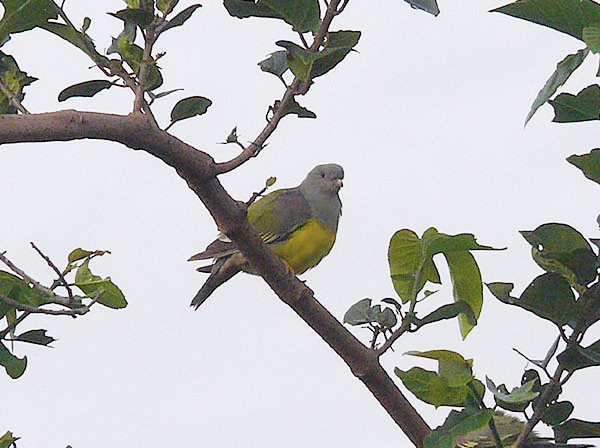
Bruce's green-pigeon, mainly a summer visitor to southern hills and wadis.

Order: Columbiformes Family: Columbidae

Pigeons and doves are stout-bodied birds with short necks and short slender bills with a fleshy cere.

- Rock pigeon, Columba livia
- Stock dove, Columba oenas (A)
- Common wood-pigeon, Columba palumbus
- European turtle-dove, Streptopelia turtur
- Oriental turtle-dove, Streptopelia orientalis
- Eurasian collared-dove, Streptopelia decaocto
- African collared-dove, Streptopelia roseogrisea (A)
- Red collared-dove, Streptopelia tranquebarica (A)
- Laughing dove, Spilopelia senegalensis
- Tambourine dove, Turtur tympanistria (A)
- Namaqua dove, Oena capensis
- Bruce's green-pigeon, Treron waalia

== Sandgrouse ==
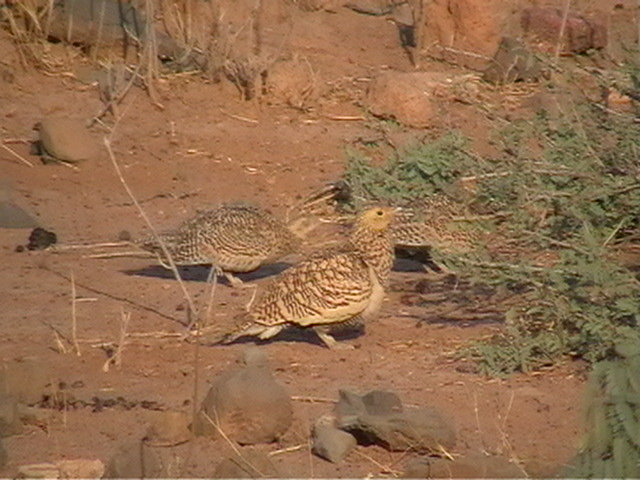
Chestnut-bellied sandgrouse, large numbers gather at water sources.

Order: Pterocliformes Family: Pteroclidae

Sandgrouse have small, pigeon like heads and necks, but sturdy compact bodies. They have long pointed wings and sometimes tails and a fast direct flight. Flocks fly to watering holes at dawn and dusk. Their legs are feathered down to the toes. There are 16 species worldwide and 5 species which occur in Oman.

- Pin-tailed sandgrouse, Pterocles alchata (A)
- Chestnut-bellied sandgrouse, Pterocles exustus
- Spotted sandgrouse, Pterocles senegallus
- Crowned sandgrouse, Pterocles coronatus
- Lichtenstein's sandgrouse, Pterocles lichtensteinii

== Bustards ==
Order: Otidiformes Family: Otididae

Bustards are large terrestrial birds mainly associated with dry open country and steppes in the Old World. They are omnivorous and nest on the ground. They walk steadily on strong legs and big toes, pecking for food as they go. They have long broad wings with "fingered" wingtips and striking patterns in flight. Many have interesting mating displays.

- MacQueen's bustard, Chlamydotis macqueenii
- Little bustard, Tetrax tetrax (A)

== Cuckoos ==
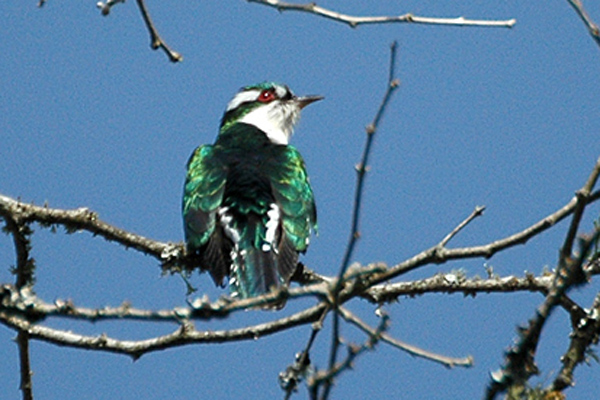
Dideric cuckoo, a summer visitor to the south.

Order: Cuculiformes Family: Cuculidae

The family Cuculidae includes cuckoos, roadrunners and anis. These birds are of variable size with slender bodies, long tails and strong legs. The Old World cuckoos are brood parasites.

- Chestnut-winged cuckoo, Clamator coromandus (A)
- Great spotted cuckoo, Clamator glandarius (A)
- Pied cuckoo, Clamator jacobinus
- Asian koel, Eudynamys scolopacea
- Dideric cuckoo, Chrysococcyx caprius
- Gray-bellied cuckoo, Cacomantis passerinus (A)
- Common hawk-cuckoo, Cuculus varius (A)
- Lesser cuckoo, Cuculus poliocephalus (A)
- Common cuckoo, Cuculus canorus

== Nightjars and allies ==
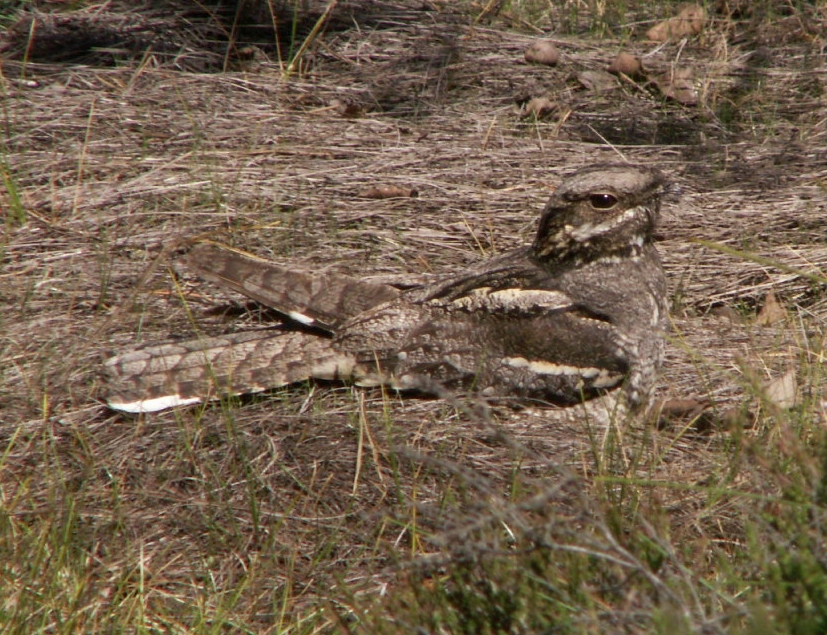
Eurasian nightjar, a fairly common migrant.

Order: Caprimulgiformes Family: Caprimulgidae

Nightjars are medium-sized nocturnal birds that usually nest on the ground. They have long wings, short legs and very short bills. Most have small feet, of little use for walking, and long pointed wings. Their soft plumage is camouflaged to resemble bark or leaves.

- Eurasian nightjar, Caprimulgus europaeus
- Egyptian nightjar, Caprimulgus aegyptius
- Nubian nightjar, Caprimulgus nubicus (A)
- Sykes's nightjar, Caprimulgus mahrattensis (A)

== Swifts ==
Order: Caprimulgiformes Family: Apodidae

Swifts are small birds which spend the majority of their lives flying. These birds have very short legs and never settle voluntarily on the ground, perching instead only on vertical surfaces. Many swifts have long swept-back wings which resemble a crescent or boomerang.

- Alpine swift, Apus melba
- Common swift, Apus apus
- Pallid swift, Apus pallidus
- Forbes-Watson's swift, Apus berliozi
- Pacific swift, Apus pacificus (A)
- Little swift, Apus affinis

== Rails, gallinules and coots ==
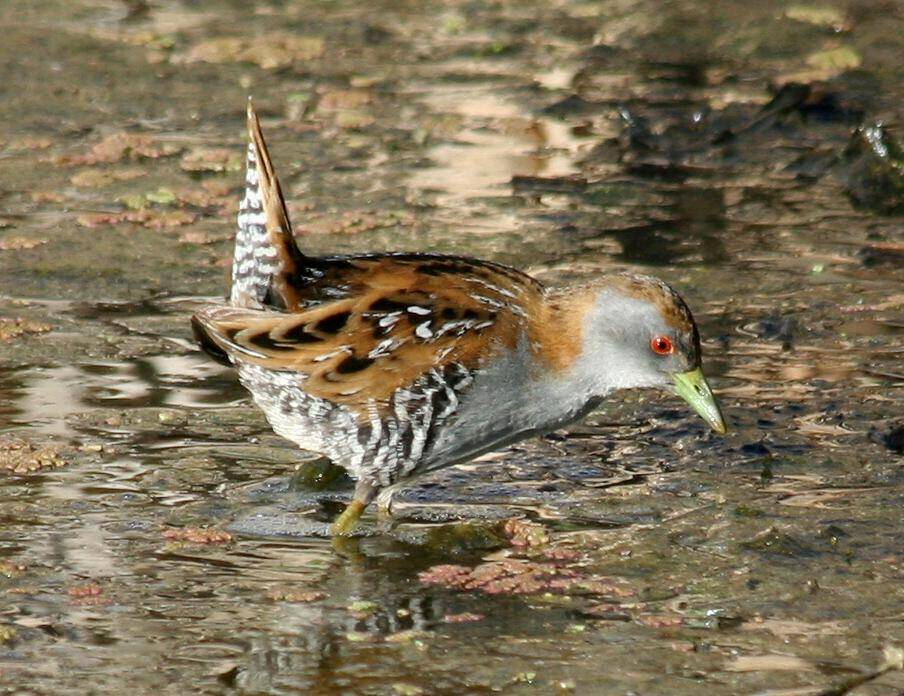
Baiilon's crake, a visitor to wetland areas between August and April.

Order: Gruiformes Family: Rallidae

Rallidae is a large family of small to medium-sized birds which includes the rails, crakes, coots and gallinules. Typically they inhabit dense vegetation in damp environments near lakes, swamps or rivers. In general they are shy and secretive birds, making them difficult to observe. Most species have strong legs and long toes which are well adapted to soft uneven surfaces. They tend to have short, rounded wings and to be weak fliers.

- Water rail, Rallus aquaticus
- Corn crake, Crex crex
- Spotted crake, Porzana porzana
- Lesser moorhen, Paragallinula angulata (A)
- Eurasian moorhen, Gallinula chloropus
- Eurasian coot, Fulica atra
- Red-knobbed coot, Fulica cristata (A)
- Allen's gallinule, Porphyrio alleni (A)
- African swamphen, Porphyrio madagascariensis (A)
- Gray-headed swamphen, Porphyrio poliocephalus (A)
- Watercock, Gallicrex cinerea (A)
- White-breasted waterhen, Amaurornis phoenicurus
- Ruddy-breasted crake, Zapornia fusca (A)
- Little crake, Zapornia parva
- Baillon's crake, Zapornia pusilla

== Cranes ==
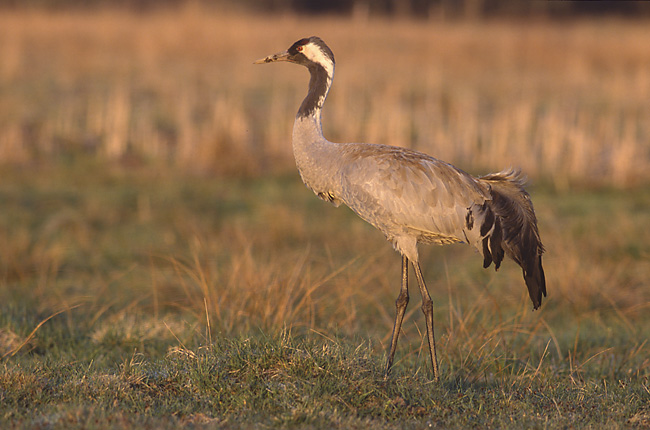
Common crane, a winter visitor in small numbers.

Order: Gruiformes Family: Gruidae

Cranes are large, long-legged and long-necked birds. Unlike the similar-looking but unrelated herons, cranes fly with necks outstretched, not pulled back. Most have elaborate and noisy courting displays or "dances".

- Demoiselle crane, Anthropoides virgo (A)
- Common crane, Grus grus

== Thick-knees ==
Order: Charadriiformes Family: Burhinidae

The thick-knees are a group of largely tropical waders in the family Burhinidae. They are found worldwide within the tropical zone, with some species also breeding in temperate Europe and Australia. They are medium to large waders with strong black or yellow-black bills, large yellow eyes and cryptic plumage. Despite being classed as waders, most species have a preference for arid or semi-arid habitats.

- Eurasian thick-knee, Burhinus oedicnemus
- Spotted thick-knee, Burhinus capensis
- Great thick-knee, Esacus recurvirostris

== Stilts and avocets ==
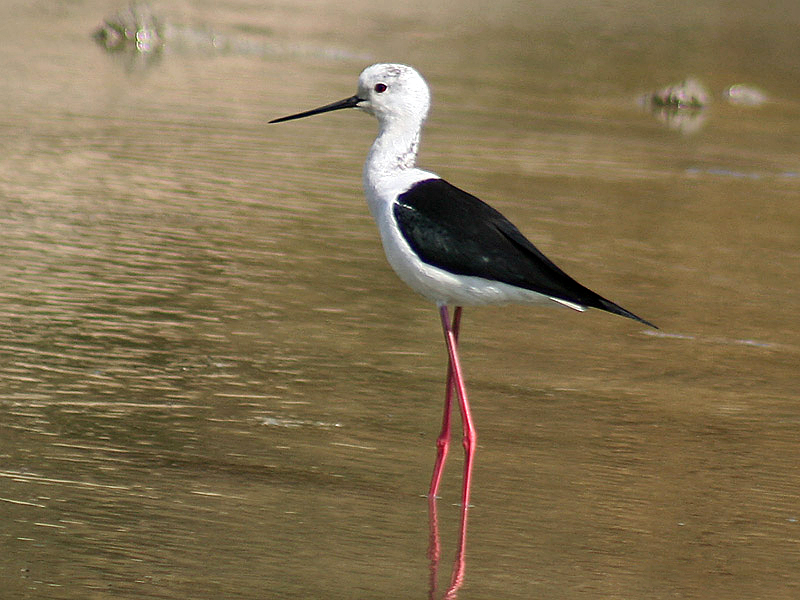
Black-winged stilt, a local breeding bird more widespread in winter.

Order: Charadriiformes Family: Recurvirostridae

Recurvirostridae is a family of large wading birds, which includes the avocets and stilts. The avocets have long legs and long up-curved bills. The stilts have extremely long legs and long, thin, straight bills.

- Black-winged stilt, Himantopus himantopus
- Pied avocet, Recurvirostra avosetta

== Oystercatchers ==
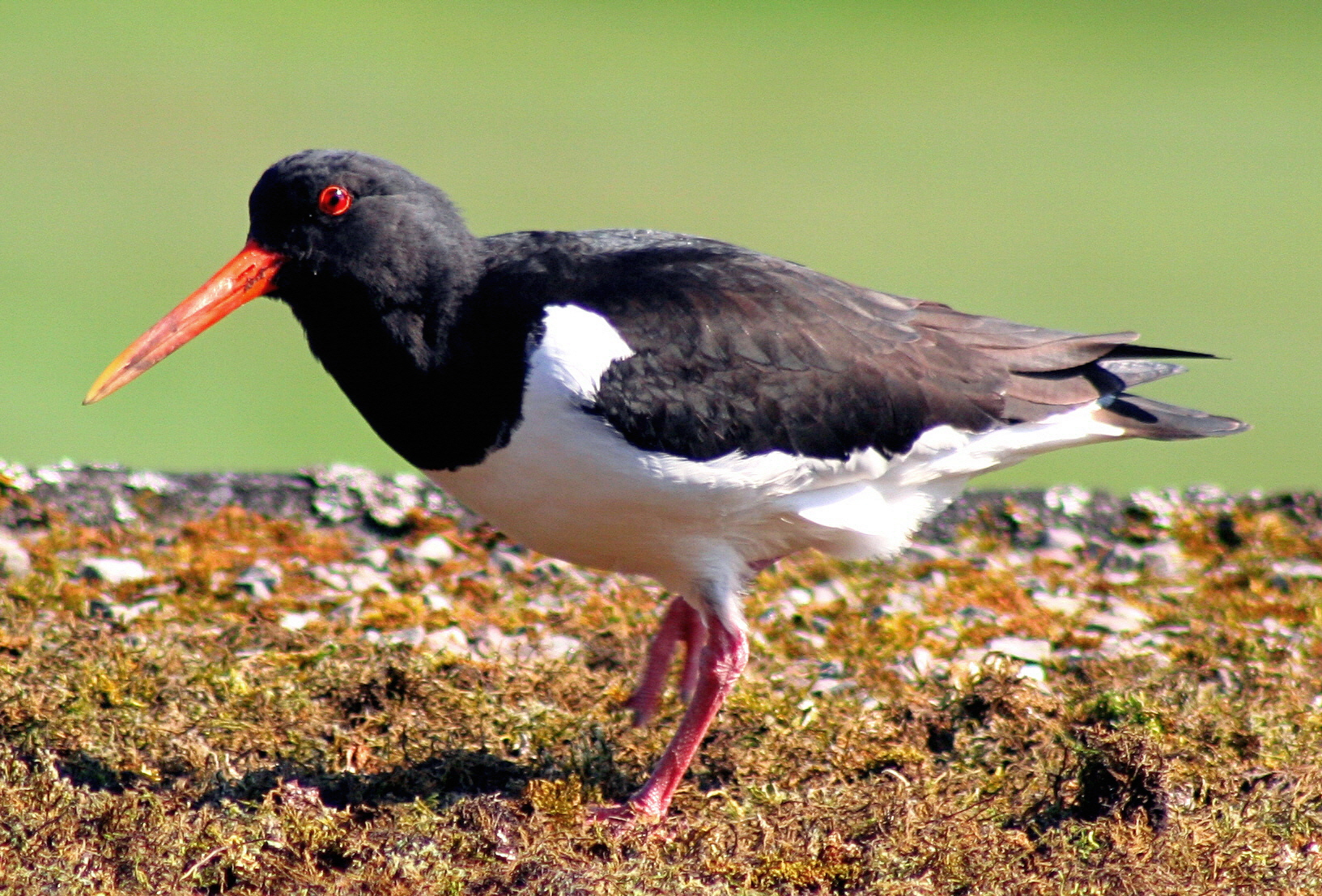
Eurasian oystercatcher, large flocks winter at Barr al Hikman and Masirah Island.

Order: Charadriiformes Family: Haematopodidae

The oystercatchers are large and noisy plover-like birds, with strong bills used for smashing or prising open molluscs.

- Eurasian oystercatcher, Haematopus ostralegus

== Plovers and lapwings ==
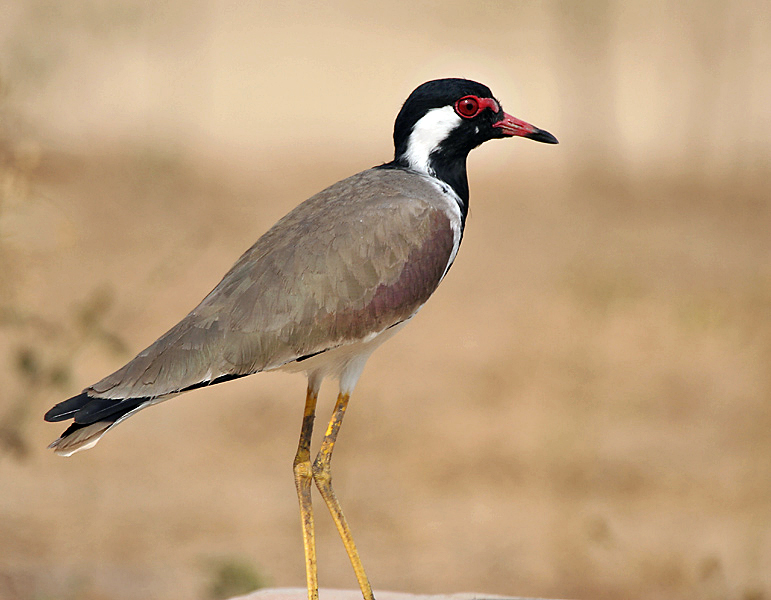
Red-wattled lapwing, a common resident in the north.

Order: Charadriiformes Family: Charadriidae

The family Charadriidae includes the plovers, dotterels and lapwings. They are small to medium-sized birds with compact bodies, short, thick necks and long, usually pointed, wings. They are found in open country worldwide, mostly in habitats near water.

- Black-bellied plover, Pluvialis squatarola
- European golden-plover, Pluvialis apricaria (A)
- American golden-plover, Pluvialis dominica (A)
- Pacific golden-plover, Pluvialis fulva
- Northern lapwing, Vanellus vanellus
- Spur-winged lapwing, Vanellus spinosus
- Gray-headed lapwing, Vanellus cinereus (A)
- Red-wattled lapwing, Vanellus indicus
- Sociable lapwing, Vanellus gregarius
- White-tailed lapwing, Vanellus leucurus
- Lesser sand-plover, Charadrius mongolus
- Greater sand-plover, Charadrius leschenaultii
- Caspian plover, Charadrius asiaticus
- Kentish plover, Charadrius alexandrinus
- Common ringed plover, Charadrius hiaticula
- Little ringed plover, Charadrius dubius
- Eurasian dotterel, Charadrius morinellus (A)

== Painted-snipes ==
Order: Charadriiformes Family: Rostratulidae

Painted-snipes are short-legged, long-billed birds similar in shape to the true snipes, but more brightly coloured.

- Greater painted-snipe, Rostratula benghalensis (A)

== Jacanas ==
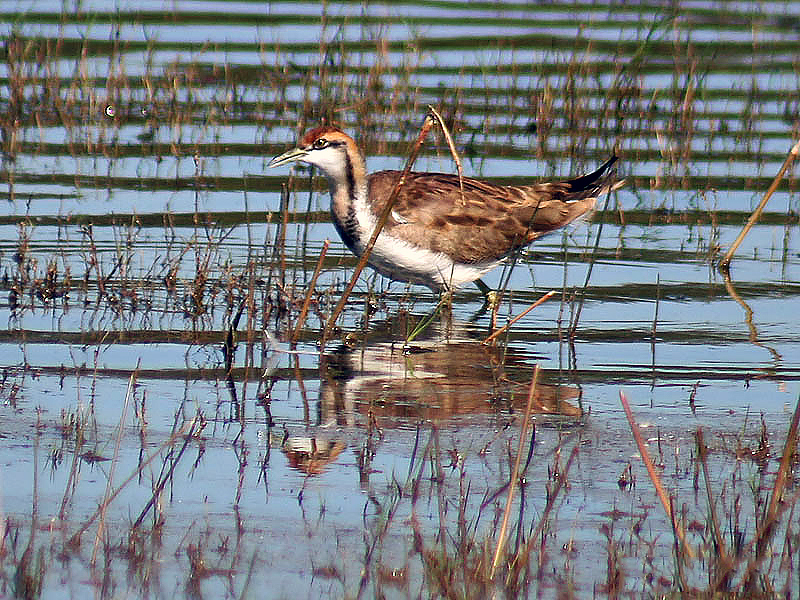
Pheasant-tailed jacana, a winter visitor mainly to the south.

Order: Charadriiformes Family: Jacanidae

The jacanas are a group of tropical waders in the family Jacanidae. They are found throughout the tropics. They are identifiable by their huge feet and claws which enable them to walk on floating vegetation in the shallow lakes that are their preferred habitat.

- Pheasant-tailed jacana, Hydrophasianus chirurgus

== Sandpipers and allies ==
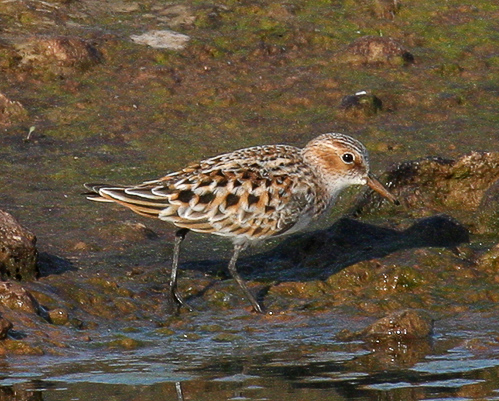
Little stint, one of Oman's commonest waders.

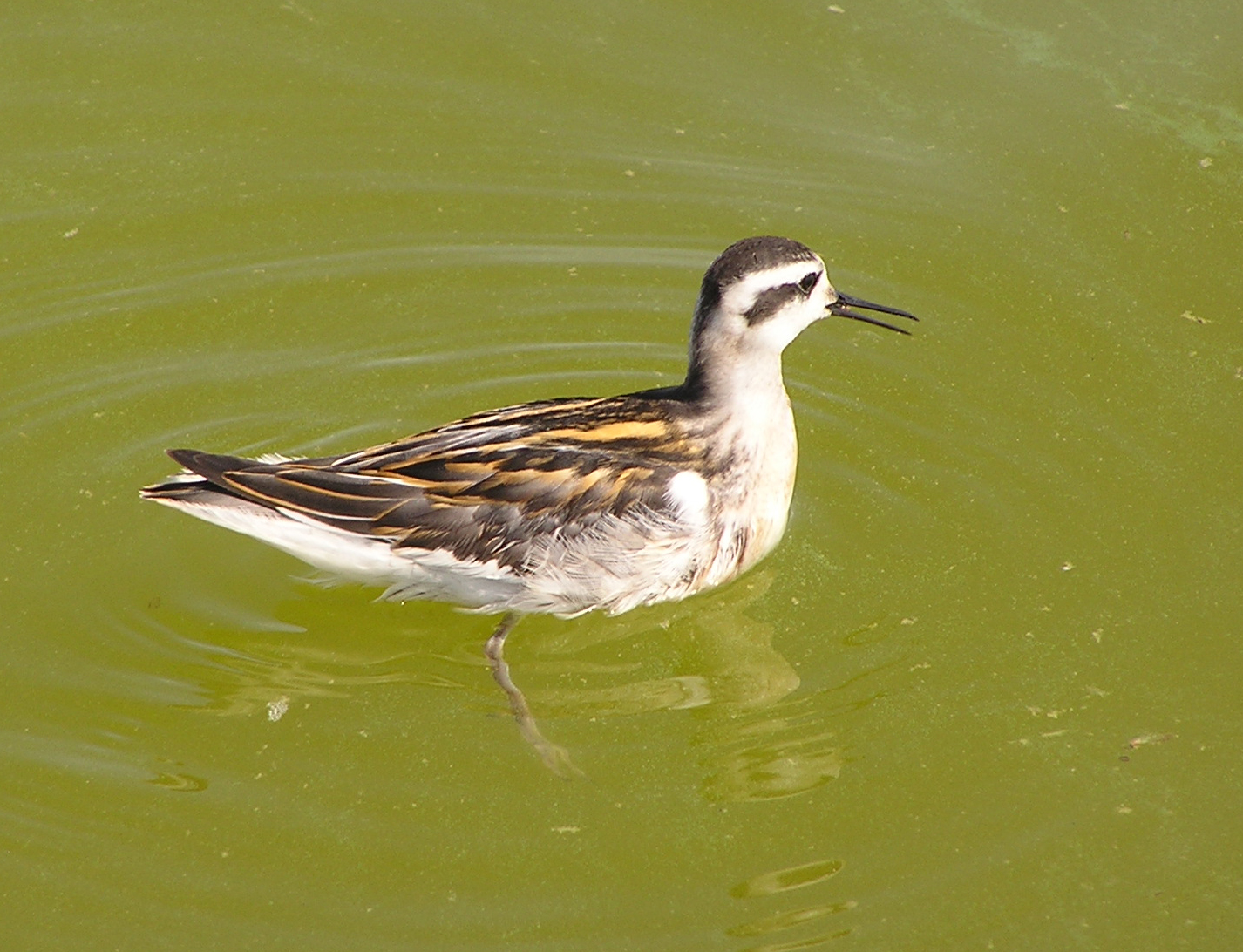
Red-necked phalarope, large numbers occur at sea.

Order: Charadriiformes Family: Scolopacidae

Scolopacidae is a large diverse family of small to medium-sized shorebirds including the sandpipers, curlews, godwits, shanks, tattlers, woodcocks, snipes, dowitchers and phalaropes. The majority of these species eat small invertebrates picked out of the mud or soil. Variation in length of legs and bills enables multiple species to feed in the same habitat, particularly on the coast, without direct competition for food.

- Whimbrel, Numenius phaeopus
- Far Eastern curlew, Numenius madagascariensis (A)
- Slender-billed curlew, Numenius tenuirostris (A)
- Eurasian curlew, Numenius arquata
- Bar-tailed godwit, Limosa lapponica
- Black-tailed godwit, Limosa limosa
- Ruddy turnstone, Arenaria interpres
- Great knot, Calidris tenuirostris
- Red knot, Calidris canutus (A)
- Ruff, Calidris pugnax
- Broad-billed sandpiper, Calidris falcinellus
- Sharp-tailed sandpiper, Calidris acuminata (A)
- Curlew sandpiper, Calidris ferruginea
- Temminck's stint, Calidris temminckii
- Long-toed stint, Calidris subminuta
- Sanderling, Calidris alba
- Dunlin, Calidris alpina
- Baird's sandpiper, Calidris bairdii (A)
- Little stint, Calidris minuta
- Buff-breasted sandpiper, Calidris subruficollis (A)
- Pectoral sandpiper, Calidris melanotos (A)
- Asian dowitcher, Limnodromus semipalmatus (A)
- Long-billed dowitcher, Limnodromus scolopaceus (A)
- Jack snipe, Lymnocryptes minimus
- Eurasian woodcock, Scolopax rusticola (A)
- Great snipe, Gallinago media
- Common snipe, Gallinago gallinago
- Pin-tailed snipe, Gallinago stenura
- Terek sandpiper, Xenus cinereus
- Wilson's phalarope, Phalaropus tricolor (A)
- Red-necked phalarope, Phalaropus lobatus
- Red phalarope, Phalaropus fulicarius
- Common sandpiper, Actitis hypoleucos
- Green sandpiper, Tringa ochropus
- Gray-tailed tattler, Tringa brevipes (A)
- Spotted redshank, Tringa erythropus
- Common greenshank, Tringa nebularia
- Lesser yellowlegs, Tringa flavipes (A)
- Marsh sandpiper, Tringa stagnatilis
- Wood sandpiper, Tringa glareola
- Common redshank, Tringa totanus

== Buttonquail ==
Order: Charadriiformes Family: Turnicidae

The buttonquail are small, drab, running birds which resemble the true quails. The female is the brighter of the sexes and initiates courtship. The male incubates the eggs and tends the young.

- Small buttonquail, Turnix sylvatica (A)

== Crab-plover ==
Order: Charadriiformes Family: Dromadidae

The crab-plover is related to the waders. It resembles a plover but with very long grey legs and a strong heavy black bill similar to a tern. It has black-and-white plumage, a long neck, partially webbed feet and a bill designed for eating crabs.

- Crab-plover, Dromas ardeola

== Pratincoles and coursers ==
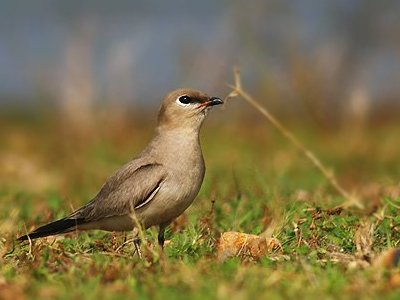
Small pratincole, small numbers occur from November to February.

Order: Charadriiformes Family: Glareolidae

Glareolidae is a family of wading birds comprising the pratincoles, which have short legs, long pointed wings and long forked tails, and the coursers, which have long legs, short wings and long, pointed bills which curve downwards.

- Cream-colored courser, Cursorius cursor
- Collared pratincole, Glareola pratincola
- Black-winged pratincole, Glareola nordmanni (A)
- Small pratincole, Glareola lactea

== Skuas and jaegers ==
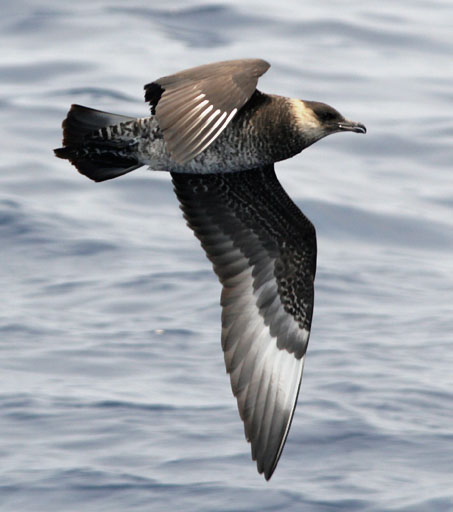
Pomarine skua, a passage migrant offshore.

Order: Charadriiformes Family: Stercorariidae

The family Stercorariidae are, in general, medium to large birds, typically with grey or brown plumage, often with white markings on the wings. They nest on the ground in temperate and arctic regions and are long-distance migrants.

- South polar skua, Stercorarius maccormicki (A)
- Brown skua, Stercorarius antarctica (A)
- Pomarine jaeger, Stercorarius pomarinus
- Parasitic jaeger, Stercorarius parasiticus
- Long-tailed jaeger, Stercorarius longicaudus (A)

== Gulls, terns, and skimmers ==
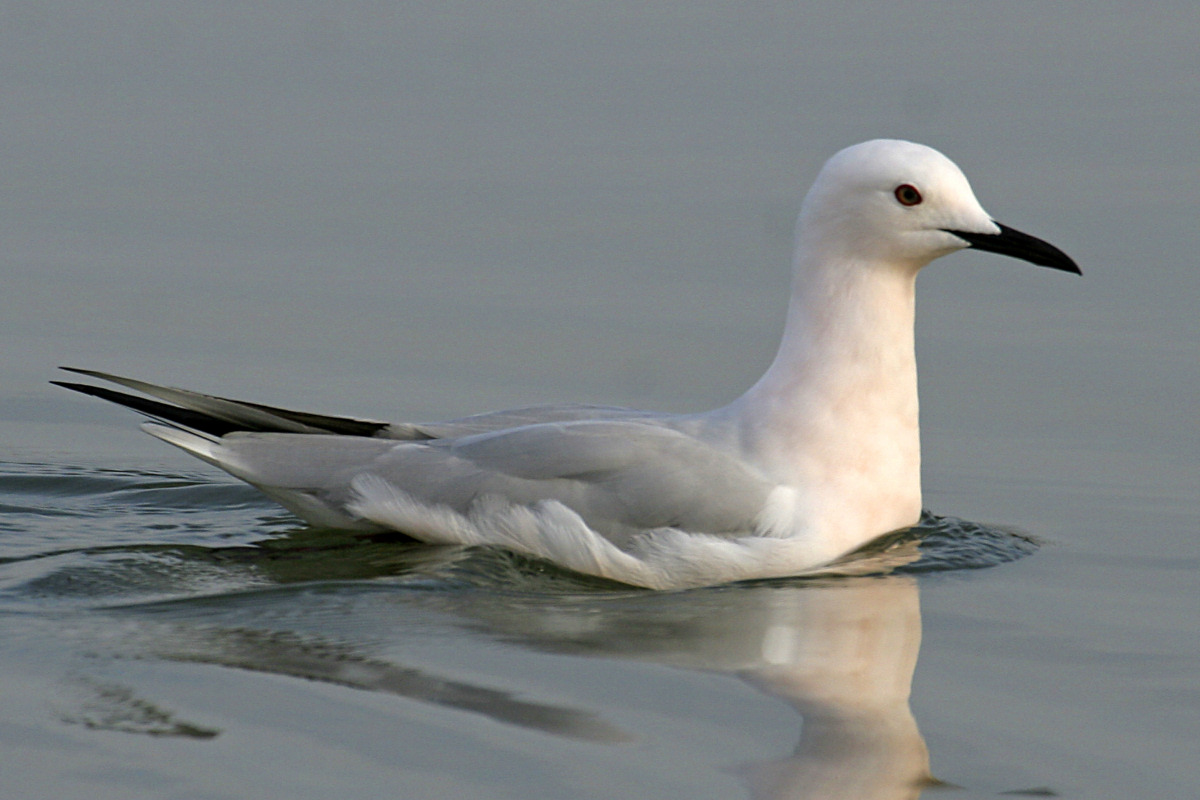
Slender-billed gull, large numbers occur around the coast.

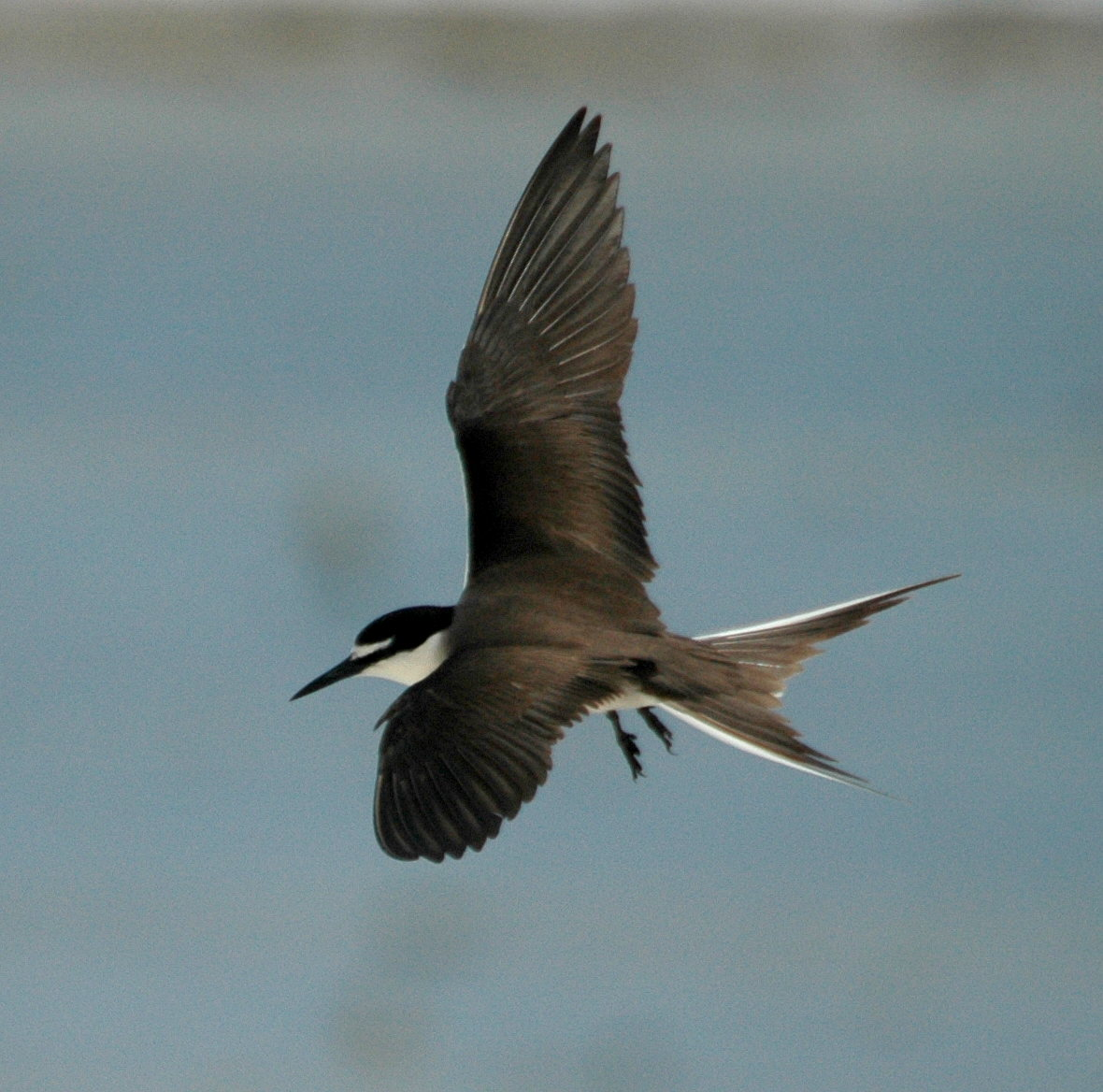
Bridled tern, common breeder on offshore islands.

Order: Charadriiformes Family: Laridae

Laridae is a family of medium to large seabirds, the gulls, terns, and skimmers. Gulls are typically grey or white, often with black markings on the head or wings. They have stout, longish bills and webbed feet. Terns are a group of generally medium to large seabirds typically with grey or white plumage, often with black markings on the head. Most terns hunt fish by diving but some pick insects off the surface of fresh water. Terns are generally long-lived birds, with several species known to live in excess of 30 years. Skimmers are a small family of tropical tern-like birds. They have an elongated lower mandible which they use to feed by flying low over the water surface and skimming the water for small fish.

- Black-legged kittiwake, Rissa tridactyla (A)
- Sabine's gull, Xema sabini (A)
- Slender-billed gull, Chroicocephalus genei
- Black-headed gull, Chroicocephalus ridibundus
- Brown-headed gull, Chroicocephalus brunnicephalus (A)
- White-eyed gull, Ichthyaetus leucophthalmus (A)
- Sooty gull, Ichthyaetus hemprichii
- Pallas's gull, Ichthyaetus ichthyaetus
- Common gull, Larus canus
- Herring gull, Larus argentatus
- Caspian gull, Larus cachinnans
- Lesser black-backed gull, Larus fuscus
- Great black-backed gull, Larus marinus (A)
- Brown noddy, Anous stolidus
- Lesser noddy, Anous tenuirostris
- Sooty tern, Onychoprion fuscatus
- Bridled tern, Onychoprion anaethetus
- Little tern, Sternula albifrons
- Saunders's tern, Sternula saundersi
- Gull-billed tern, Gelochelidon nilotica
- Caspian tern, Hydroprogne caspia
- Black tern, Chlidonias niger (A)
- White-winged tern, Chlidonias leucopterus
- Whiskered tern, Chlidonias hybridus
- Roseate tern, Sterna dougallii
- Common tern, Sterna hirundo
- Arctic tern, Sterna paradisaea (A)
- White-cheeked tern, Sterna repressa
- Great crested tern, Thalasseus bergii
- Sandwich tern, Thalasseus sandvicensis
- Lesser crested tern, Thalasseus bengalensis
- African skimmer, Rynchops flavirostris (A)
- Indian skimmer, Rynchops albicollis (A)

== Tropicbirds ==
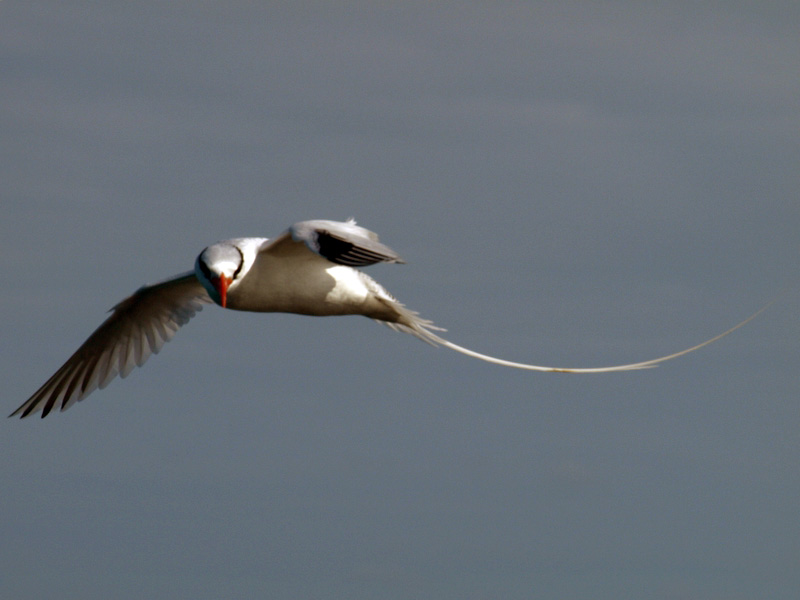
Red-billed tropicbird, breeds on islands and cliffs.

Order: Phaethontiformes Family: Phaethontidae

Tropicbirds are slender white birds of tropical oceans, with exceptionally long central tail feathers. Their heads and long wings have black markings.

- Red-billed tropicbird, Phaethon aethereus

== Southern storm-petrels ==
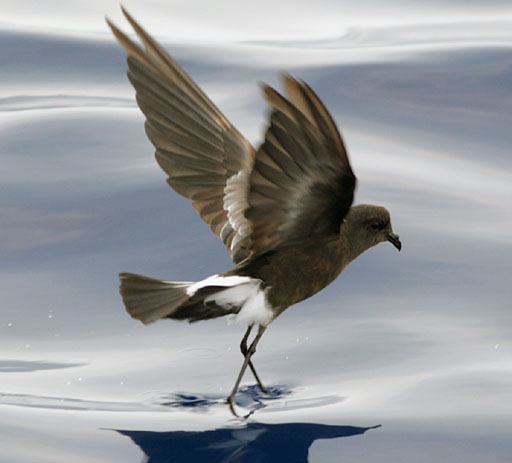
Wilson's storm petrel, fairly common offshore during summer.

Order: Procellariiformes Family: Oceanitidae

The southern storm-petrels are relatives of the petrels and are the smallest seabirds. They feed on planktonic crustaceans and small fish picked from the surface, typically while hovering. The flight is fluttering and sometimes bat-like.

- Wilson's storm-petrel, Oceanites oceanicus
- White-faced storm-petrel, Pelagodroma marina (A)
- White-bellied storm-petrel, Fregetta grallaria (A)
- Black-bellied storm-petrel, Fregetta tropica (A)

== Northern storm-petrels ==
Order: Procellariiformes Family: Hydrobatidae

The northern storm-petrels are relatives of the petrels and are the smallest seabirds. They feed on planktonic crustaceans and small fish picked from the surface, typically while hovering. The flight is fluttering and sometimes bat-like.

- Swinhoe's storm-petrel, Hydrobates monorhis (A)
- Matsudaira's storm-petrel, Hydrobates matsudairae (A)

== Shearwaters and petrels ==
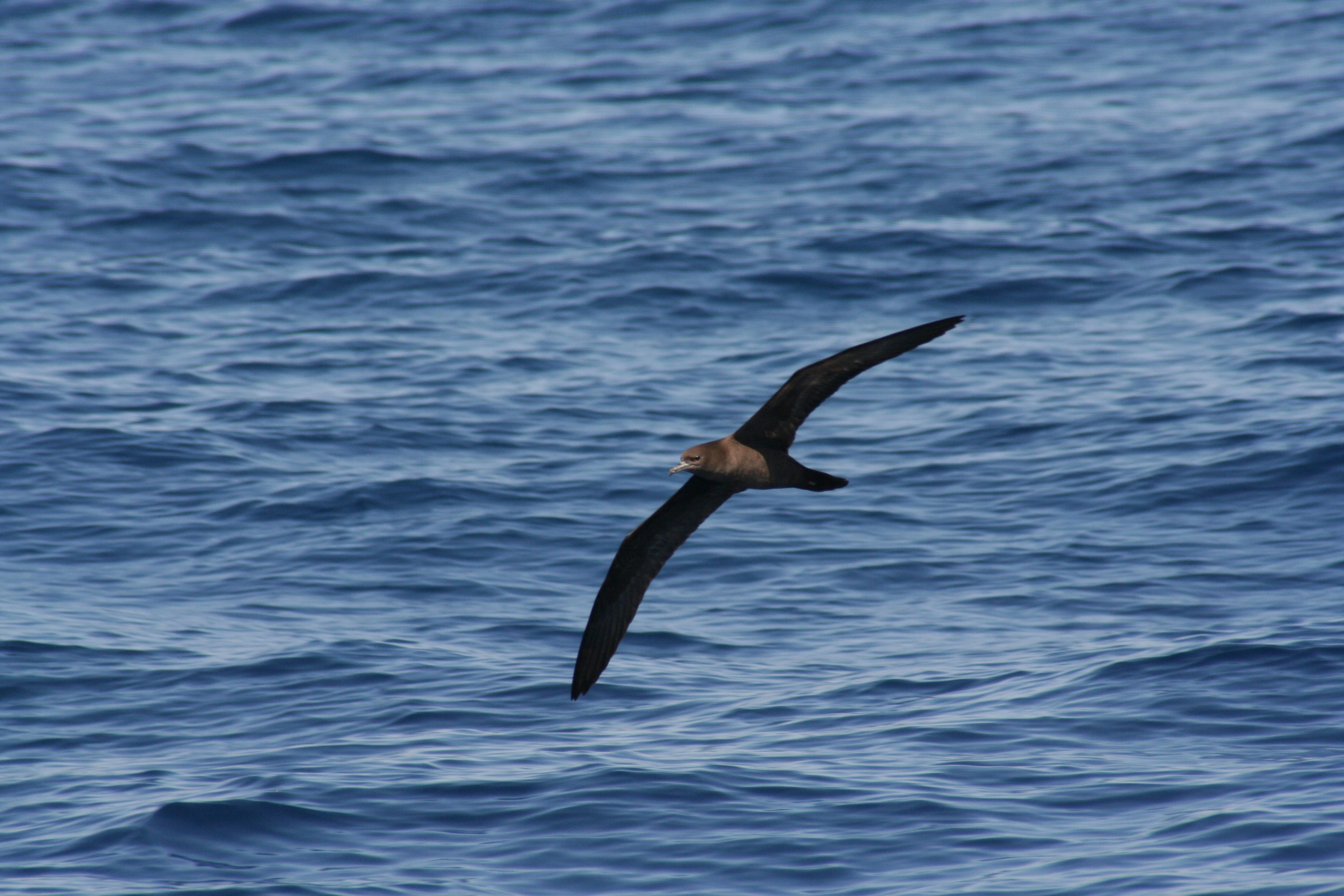
Flesh-footed shearwater, occurs offshore in summer.

Order: Procellariiformes Family: Procellariidae

The procellariids are the main group of medium-sized "true petrels", characterised by united nostrils with medium septum and a long outer functional primary.

- Cape petrel, Daption capense (A)
- Trindade petrel, Pterodroma arminjoniana (A)
- Jouanin's petrel, Bulweria fallax
- Tahiti petrel, Pseudobulweria rostrata (A)
- Streaked shearwater, Calonectris leucomelas (A)
- Cory's shearwater, Calonectris diomedea (A)
- Flesh-footed shearwater, Ardenna carneipes
- Wedge-tailed shearwater, Ardenna pacificus
- Sooty shearwater, Ardenna griseus (A)
- Persian shearwater, Puffinus persicus

== Storks ==
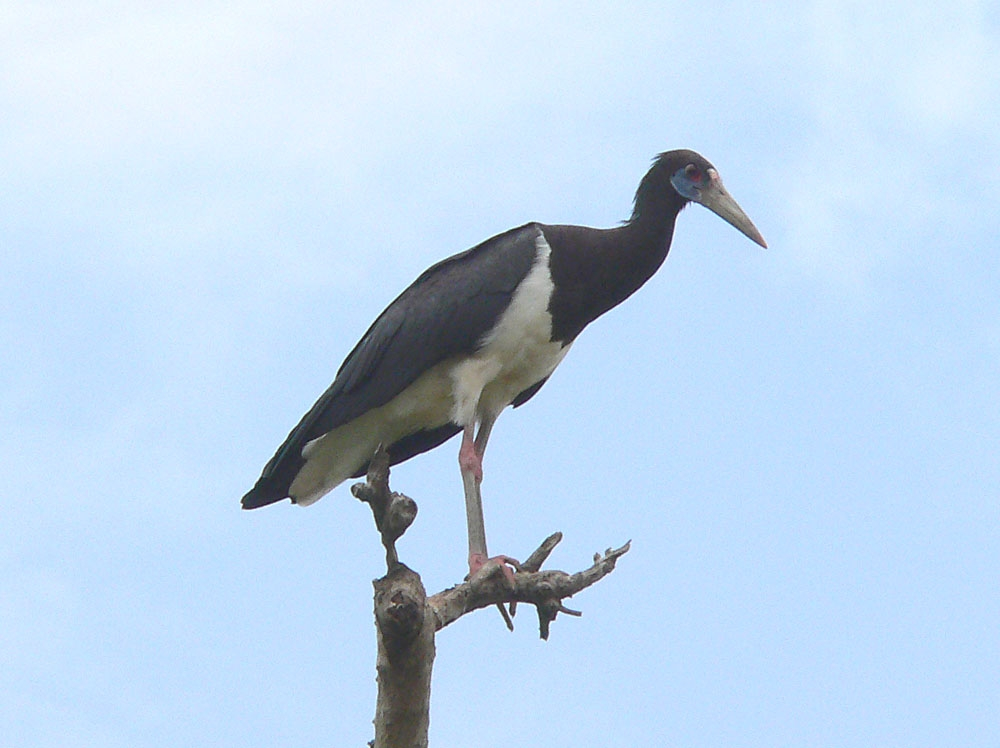
Abdim's stork, an irregular migrant from Africa.

Order: Ciconiiformes Family: Ciconiidae

Storks are large, long-legged, long-necked, wading birds with long, stout bills. Storks are mute, but bill-clattering is an important mode of communication at the nest. Their nests can be large and may be reused for many years. Many species are migratory.

- African openbill, Anastomus lamelligerus (A)
- Black stork, Ciconia nigra (A)
- Abdim's stork, Ciconia abdimii
- White stork, Ciconia ciconia

== Frigatebirds ==
Order: Suliformes Family: Fregatidae

Frigatebirds are large seabirds usually found over tropical oceans. They are large, black-and-white or completely black, with long wings and deeply forked tails. The males have coloured inflatable throat pouches. They do not swim or walk and cannot take off from a flat surface. Having the largest wingspan-to-body-weight ratio of any bird, they are essentially aerial, able to stay aloft for more than a week.

- Lesser frigatebird, Fregata ariel (A)
- Great frigatebird, Fregata minor (A)

== Boobies and gannets ==
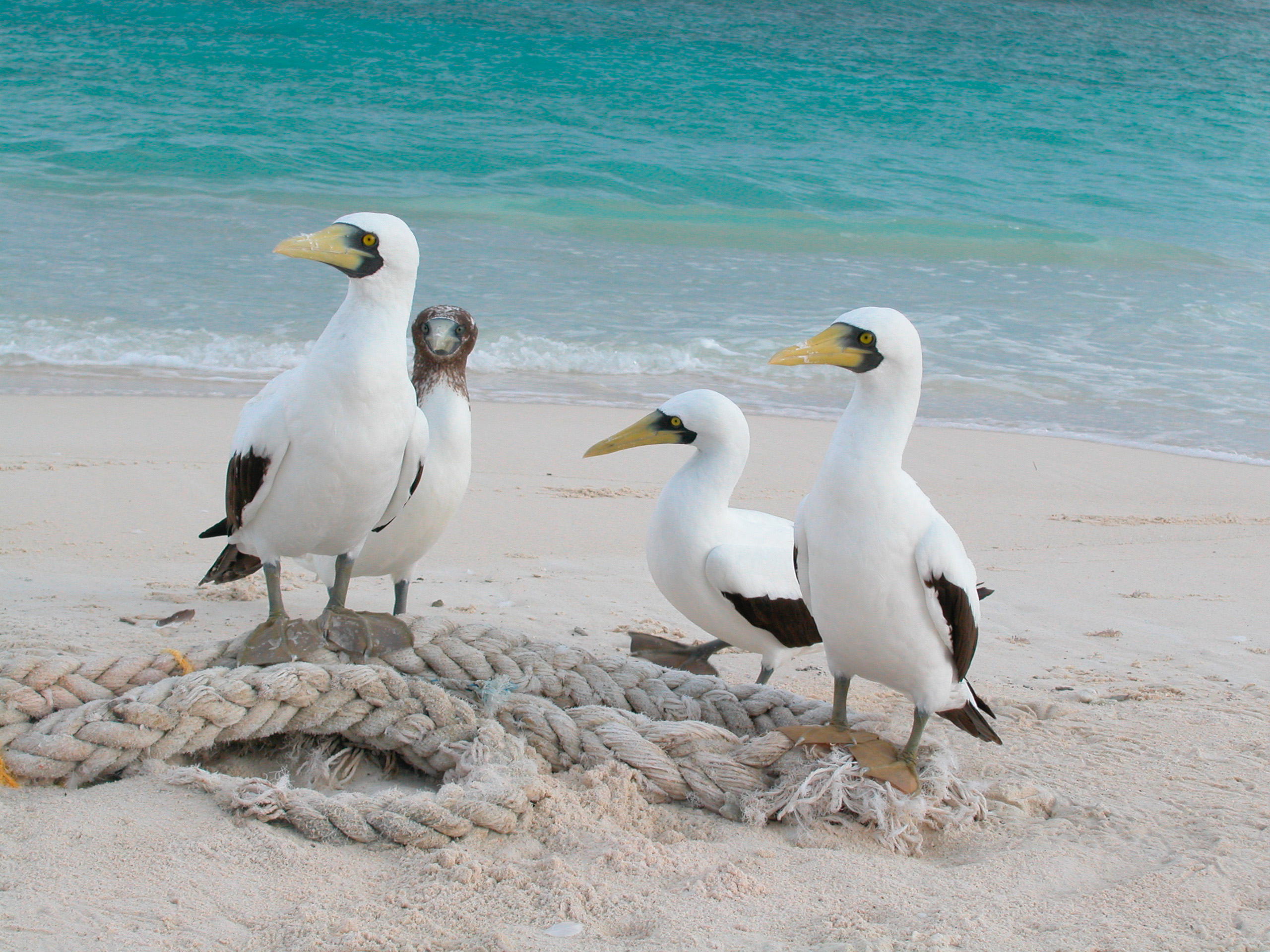
Masked boobies, colonies breed on the Al Hallaniyyat Islands.

Order: Suliformes Family: Sulidae

The sulids comprise the gannets and boobies. Both groups are medium to large coastal seabirds that plunge-dive for fish.

- Masked booby, Sula dactylatra
- Brown booby, Sula leucogaster
- Red-footed booby, Sula sula (A)
- Cape gannet, Morus capensis (A)

== Cormorants and shags ==
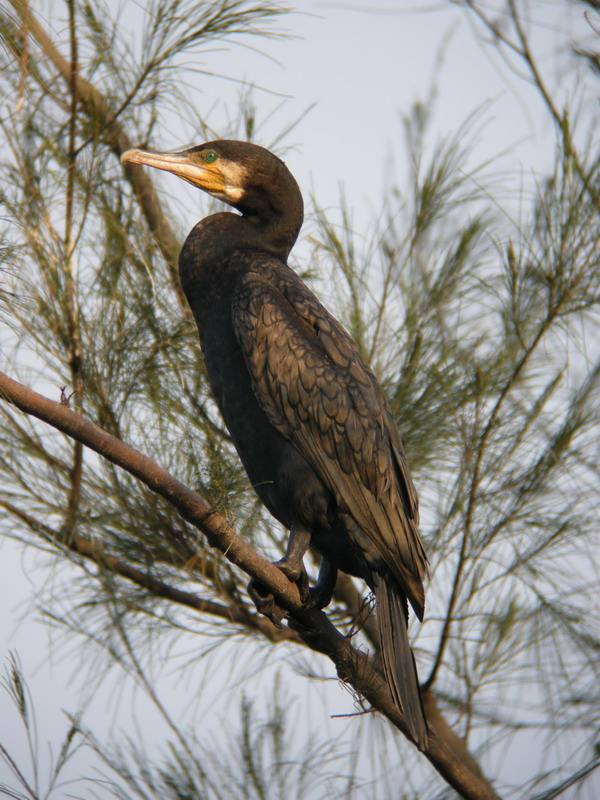
Great cormorant, a common winter visitor.

Order: Suliformes Family: Phalacrocoracidae

Phalacrocoracidae is a family of medium to large coastal, fish-eating seabirds that includes cormorants and shags. Plumage colouration varies, with the majority having mainly dark plumage, some species being black-and-white and a few being colourful.

- Long-tailed cormorant, Microcarbo africanus (A)
- Great cormorant, Phalacrocorax carbo
- Socotra cormorant, Phalacrocorax nigrogularis

== Pelicans ==
Order: Pelecaniformes Family: Pelecanidae

Pelicans are large water birds with a distinctive pouch under their beak. As with other members of the order Pelecaniformes, they have webbed feet with four toes.

- Great white pelican, Pelecanus onocrotalus (A)
- Pink-backed pelican, Pelecanus rufescens (A)
- Dalmatian pelican, Pelecanus crispus (A)

== Herons, egrets, and bitterns ==
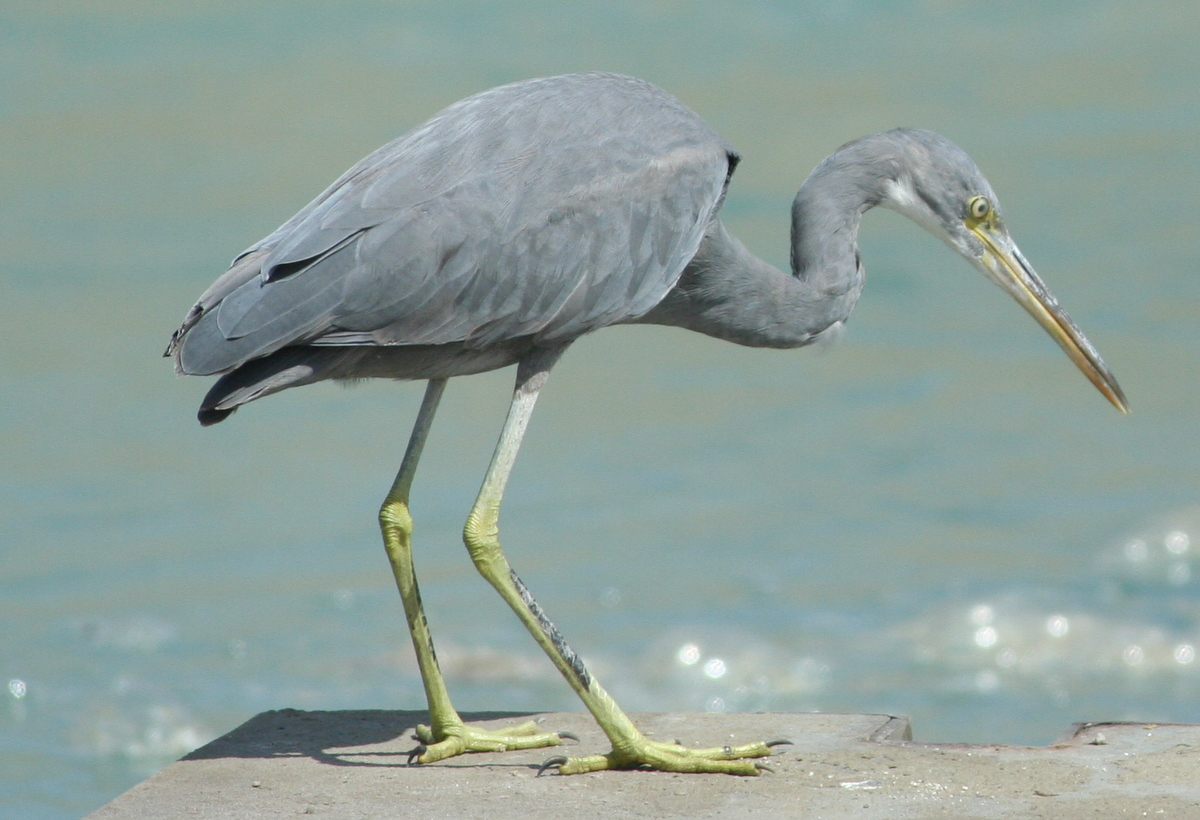
Western reef-heron, common along the coast.

Order: Pelecaniformes Family: Ardeidae

The family Ardeidae contains the bitterns, herons and egrets. Herons and egrets are medium to large wading birds with long necks and legs. Bitterns tend to be shorter necked and more wary. Members of Ardeidae fly with their necks retracted, unlike other long-necked birds such as storks, ibises and spoonbills.

- Great bittern, Botaurus stellaris
- Yellow bittern, Ixobrychus sinensis
- Little bittern, Ixobrychus minutus
- Cinnamon bittern, Ixobrychus cinnamomeus (A)
- Dwarf bittern, Ixobrychus sturmii (A)
- Gray heron, Ardea cinerea
- Black-headed heron, Ardea melanocephala (A)
- Goliath heron, Ardea goliath (A)
- Purple heron, Ardea purpurea
- Great egret, Ardea alba
- Intermediate egret, Ardea intermedia
- Little egret, Egretta garzetta
- Western reef-heron, Egretta gularis
- Black heron, Egretta ardesiaca (A)
- Cattle egret, Bubulcus ibis
- Squacco heron, Ardeola ralloides
- Indian pond-heron, Ardeola grayii
- Chinese pond-heron, Ardeola bacchus (A)
- Striated heron, Butorides striata
- Black-crowned night-heron, Nycticorax nycticorax

== Ibises and spoonbills ==
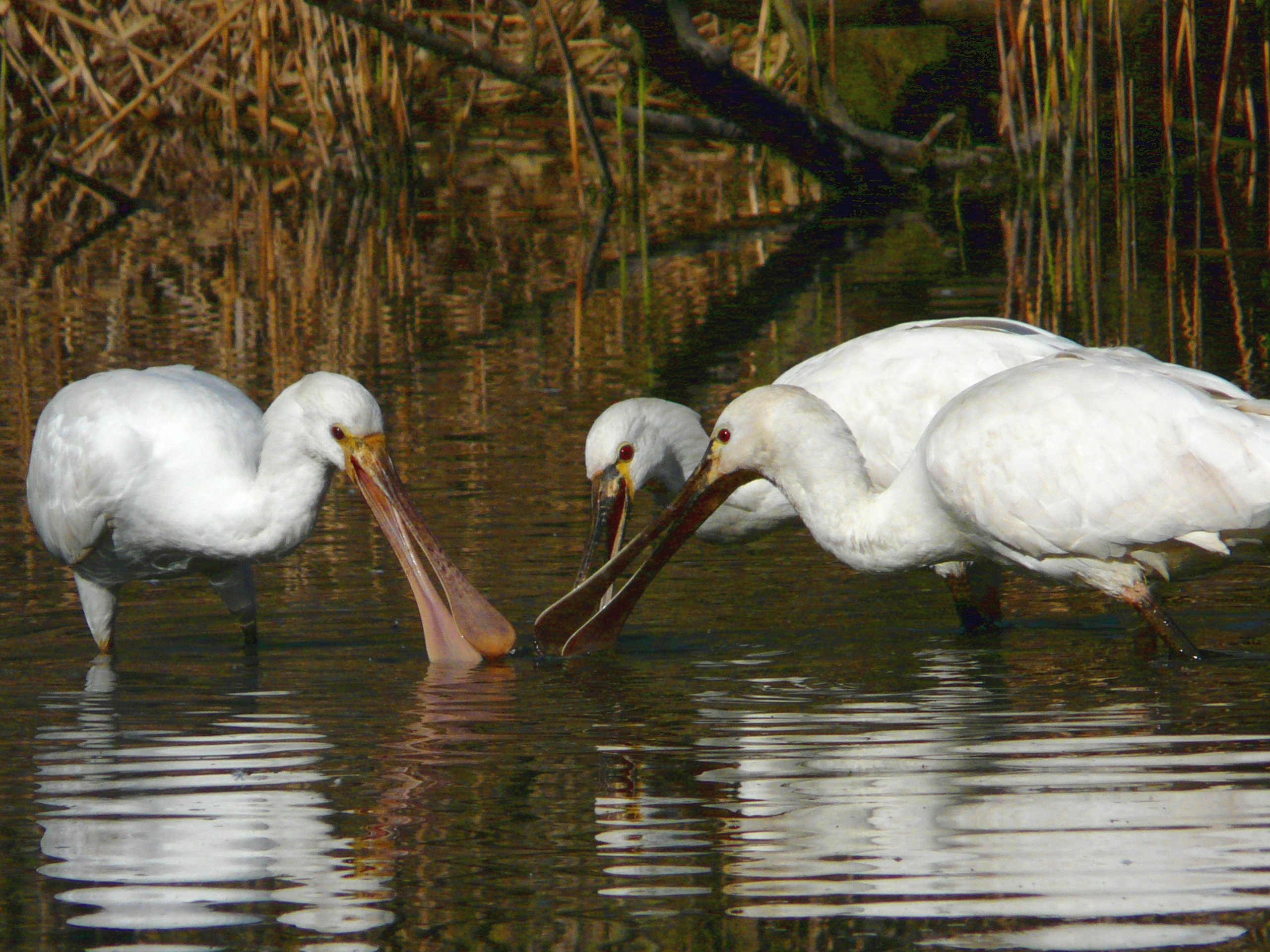
Eurasian spoonbills, common at coastal wetlands.

Order: Pelecaniformes Family: Threskiornithidae

Threskiornithidae is a family of large terrestrial and wading birds which includes the ibises and spoonbills. They have long, broad wings with 11 primary and about 20 secondary feathers. They are strong fliers and despite their size and weight, very capable soarers.

- Glossy ibis, Plegadis falcinellus
- African sacred ibis, Threskiornis aethiopicus (A)
- Eurasian spoonbill, Platalea leucorodia
- African spoonbill, Platalea alba (A)

== Osprey ==
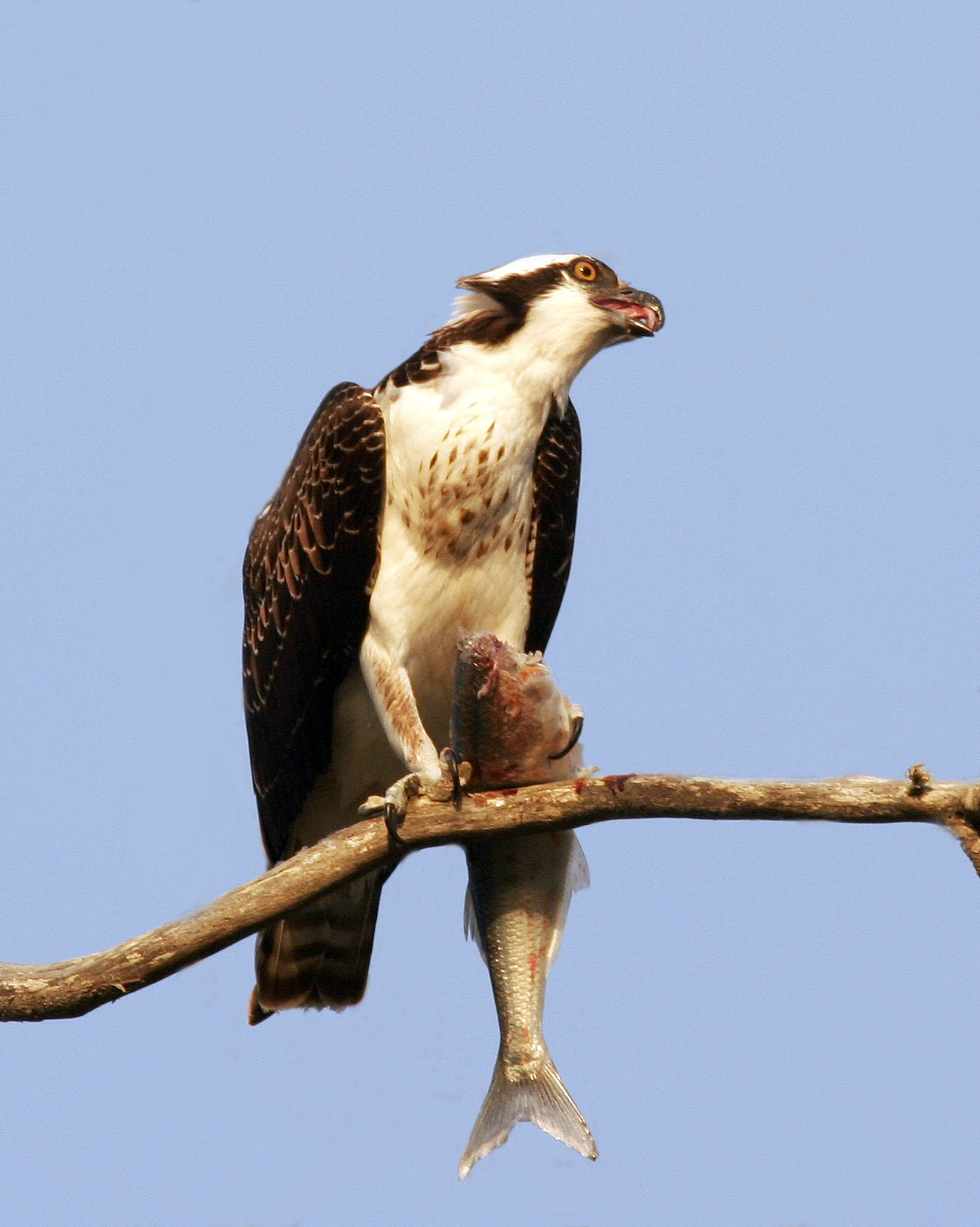
Osprey, breeds on coastal cliffs and islands.

Order: Accipitriformes Family: Pandionidae

The family Pandionidae contains only one species, the osprey. The osprey is a medium-large raptor which is a specialist fish-eater with a worldwide distribution.

- Osprey, Pandion haliaetus

== Hawks, eagles, and kites ==
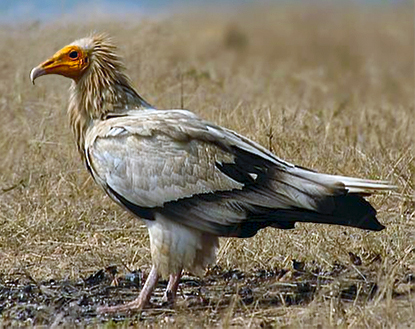
Egyptian vulture, common around rubbish tips.

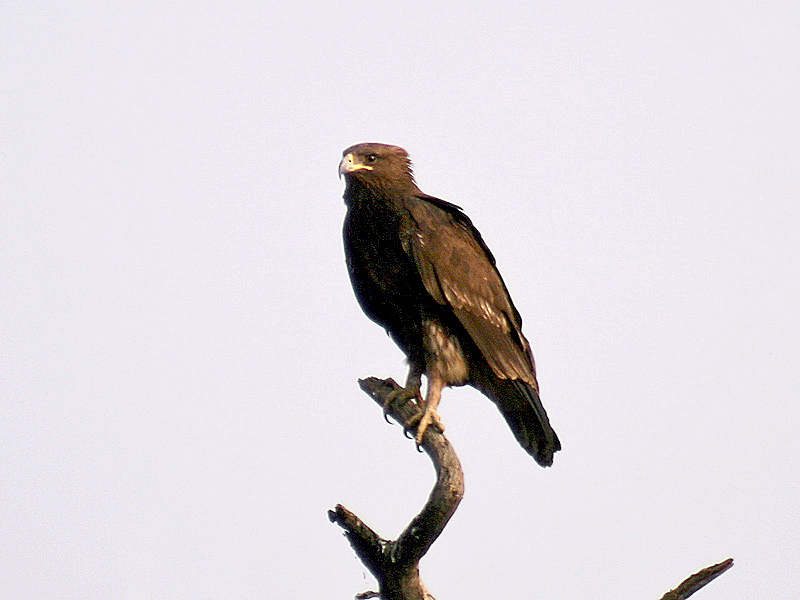
Greater spotted eagle, a common winter visitor.

Order: Accipitriformes Family: Accipitridae

Accipitridae is a family of birds of prey, which includes hawks, eagles, kites, harriers and Old World vultures. These birds have powerful hooked beaks for tearing flesh from their prey, strong legs, powerful talons and keen eyesight.

- Black-winged kite, Elanus caeruleus (A)
- Bearded vulture, Gypaetus barbatus (A)
- Egyptian vulture, Neophron percnopterus
- European honey-buzzard, Pernis apivorus (A)
- Oriental honey-buzzard, Pernis ptilorhynchus (A)
- Cinereous vulture, Aegypius monachus (A)
- Lappet-faced vulture, Torgos tracheliotos
- Eurasian griffon, Gyps fulvus
- Short-toed snake-eagle, Circaetus gallicus
- Lesser spotted eagle, Clanga pomarina (A)
- Greater spotted eagle, Clanga clanga
- Booted eagle, Hieraaetus pennatus
- Tawny eagle, Aquila rapax (A)
- Steppe eagle, Aquila nipalensis
- Imperial eagle, Aquila heliaca
- Golden eagle, Aquila chrysaetos
- Verreaux's eagle, Aquila verreauxii
- Bonelli's eagle, Aquila fasciata
- White-eyed buzzard, Butastur teesa (A)
- Eurasian marsh-harrier, Circus aeruginosus
- Hen harrier, Circus cyaneus
- Pallid harrier, Circus macrourus
- Montagu's harrier, Circus pygargus
- Shikra, Accipiter badius (A)
- Eurasian sparrowhawk, Accipiter nisus
- Northern goshawk, Accipiter gentilis (A)
- Black kite, Milvus migrans
- Brahminy kite, Haliastur indus (A)
- Pallas's fish-eagle, Haliaeetus leucoryphus (A)
- Common buzzard, Buteo buteo
- Long-legged buzzard, Buteo rufinus

== Barn-owls ==
Order: Strigiformes Family: Tytonidae

Barn-owls are medium to large owls with large heads and characteristic heart-shaped faces. They have long strong legs with powerful talons.

- Western barn owl, Tyto alba

== Owls ==
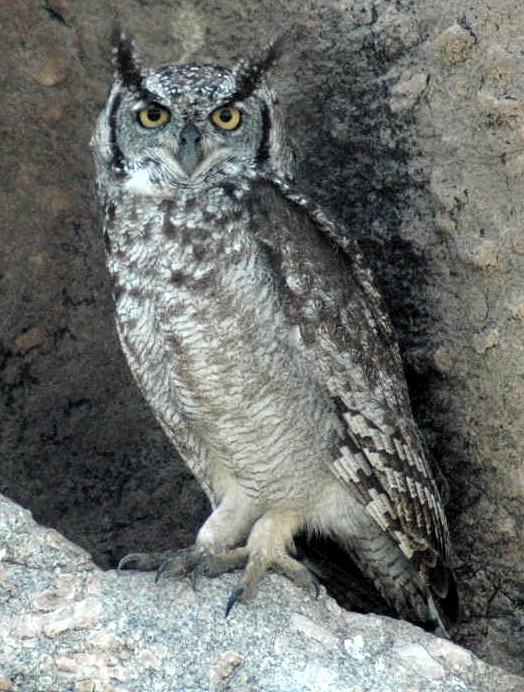
Spotted eagle-owl, a rare resident of wooded areas.

Order: Strigiformes Family: Strigidae

The typical owls are small to large solitary nocturnal birds of prey. They have large forward-facing eyes and ears, a hawk-like beak and a conspicuous circle of feathers around each eye called a facial disk.

- Arabian scops-owl, Otus pamelae
- Eurasian scops-owl, Otus scops
- African scops-owl, Otus senegalensis (A)
- Pallid scops-owl, Otus brucei
- Pharaoh eagle-owl, Bubo ascalaphus
- Arabian eagle-owl, Bubo milesi
- Little owl, Athene noctua
- Desert owl, Strix hadorami
- Omani owl, Strix butleri
- Long-eared owl, Asio otus (A)
- Short-eared owl, Asio flammeus (A)

== Hoopoes ==
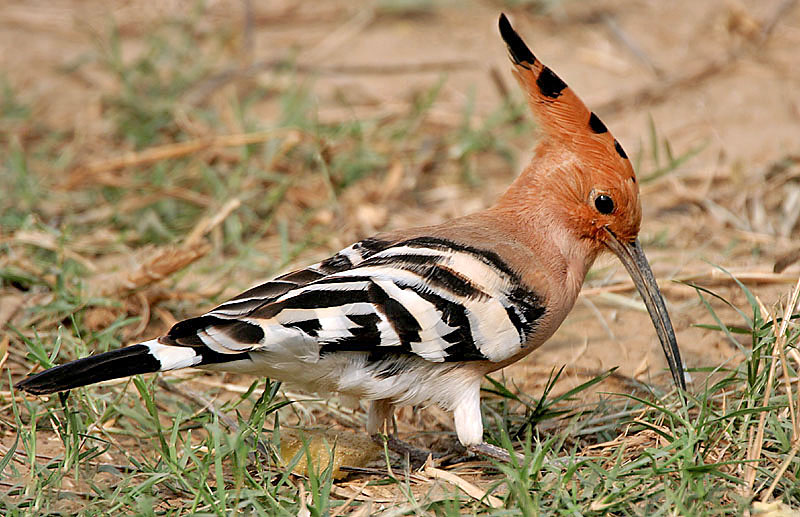
Eurasian hoopoe, a few breed in the north but larger numbers occur from autumn to spring.

Order: Bucerotiformes Family: Upupidae

Hoopoes have black, white and orangey-pink colouring with a large erectile crest on their head.

- Eurasian hoopoe, Upupa epops

== Kingfishers ==
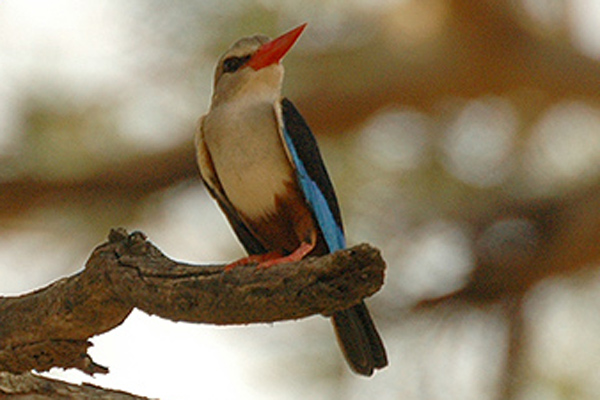
Gray-headed kingfisher, a breeding migrant to the south.

Order: Coraciiformes Family: Alcedinidae

Kingfishers are medium-sized birds with large heads, long, pointed bills, short legs and stubby tails.

- Common kingfisher, Alcedo atthis
- Malachite kingfisher, Alcedo cristata (A)
- White-throated kingfisher, Halcyon smyrnensis (A)
- Gray-headed kingfisher, Halcyon leucocephala
- Collared kingfisher, Todirhamphus chloris
- Pied kingfisher, Ceryle rudis (A)

== Bee-eaters ==
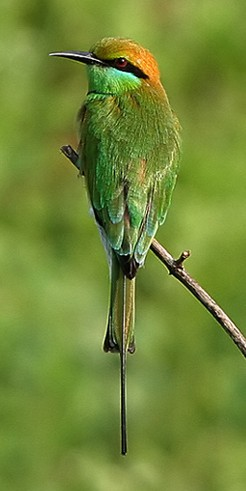
Green bee-eater, common in northern and southern areas.

Order: Coraciiformes Family: Meropidae

The bee-eaters are a group of near passerine birds in the family Meropidae. Most species are found in Africa but others occur in southern Europe, Madagascar, Australia and New Guinea. They are characterised by richly coloured plumage, slender bodies and usually elongated central tail feathers. All are colourful and have long downturned bills and pointed wings, which give them a swallow-like appearance when seen from afar.

- White-throated bee-eater, Merops albicollis (A)
- Arabian green bee-eater, Merops cyanophrys
- Blue-cheeked bee-eater, Merops persicus
- European bee-eater, Merops apiaster

== Rollers ==
Order: Coraciiformes Family: Coraciidae

Rollers resemble crows in size and build, but are more closely related to the kingfishers and bee-eaters. They share the colourful appearance of those groups with blues and browns predominating. The two inner front toes are connected, but the outer toe is not.

- European roller, Coracias garrulus
- Lilac-breasted roller, Coracias caudata (A)
- Indian roller, Coracias benghalensis

== Woodpeckers ==
Order: Piciformes Family: Picidae

Woodpeckers are small to medium-sized birds with chisel-like beaks, short legs, stiff tails and long tongues used for capturing insects. Some species have feet with two toes pointing forward and two backward, while several species have only three toes. Many woodpeckers have the habit of tapping noisily on tree trunks with their beaks.

- Eurasian wryneck, Jynx torquilla

== Falcons ==
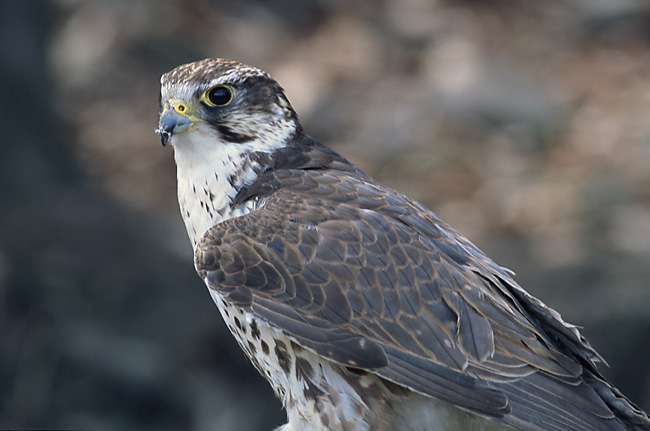
Saker falcon, declining in numbers.

Order: Falconiformes Family: Falconidae

Falconidae is a family of diurnal birds of prey. They differ from hawks, eagles and kites in that they kill with their beaks instead of their talons.

- Lesser kestrel, Falco naumanni
- Eurasian kestrel, Falco tinnunculus
- Amur falcon, Falco amurensis
- Eleonora's falcon, Falco eleonorae (A)
- Sooty falcon, Falco concolor
- Merlin, Falco columbarius (A)
- Eurasian hobby, Falco subbuteo
- Lanner falcon, Falco biarmicus
- Saker falcon, Falco cherrug
- Peregrine falcon, Falco peregrinus

== Old World parrots ==
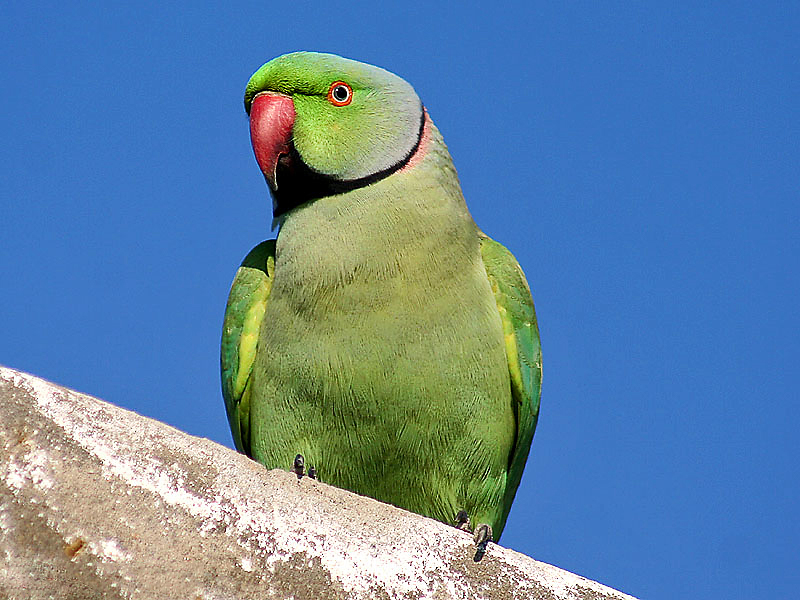
Rose-ringed parakeet, common in the north and increasing in the south.

Order: Psittaciformes Family: Psittaculidae

Characteristic features of parrots include a strong curved bill, an upright stance, strong legs, and clawed zygodactyl feet. Many parrots are vividly coloured, and some are multi-coloured. In size they range from 8 cm (3.1 in) to 1 m (3.3 ft) in length. Old World parrots are found from Africa east across south and southeast Asia and Oceania to Australia and New Zealand.

- Alexandrine parakeet, Psittacula eupatria (I)
- Rose-ringed parakeet, Psittacula krameri (I)

== Old World orioles ==
Order: Passeriformes Family: Oriolidae

The Old World orioles are colourful passerine birds. They are not related to the New World orioles.

- Eurasian golden oriole, Oriolus oriolus
- Black-naped oriole, Oriolus chinensis (A)

== Bushshrikes and allies ==
Order: Passeriformes Family: Malaconotidae

Bushshrikes are similar in habits to shrikes, hunting insects and other small prey from a perch on a bush. Although similar in build to the shrikes, these tend to be either colourful species or largely black; some species are quite secretive.

- Black-crowned tchagra, Tchagra senegala

== Drongos ==
Order: Passeriformes Family: Dicruridae

The drongos are mostly black or dark grey in colour, sometimes with metallic tints. They have long forked tails, and some Asian species have elaborate tail decorations. They have short legs and sit very upright when perched, like a shrike. They flycatch or take prey from the ground.

- Black drongo, Dicrurus macrocercus (A)
- Ashy drongo, Dicrurus leucophaeus (A)

== Monarch flycatchers ==
Order: Passeriformes Family: Monarchidae

The monarch flycatchers are small to medium-sized insectivorous passerines which hunt by flycatching.

- African paradise-flycatcher, Terpsiphone viridis

== Shrikes ==
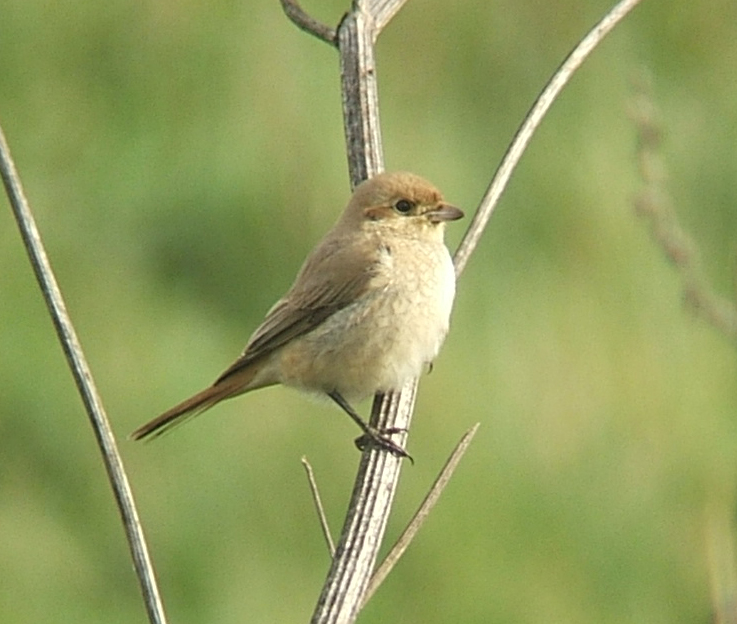
Isabelline shrike, very common from August to May.

Order: Passeriformes Family: Laniidae

Shrikes are passerine birds known for their habit of catching other birds and small animals and impaling the uneaten portions of their bodies on thorns. A typical shrike's beak is hooked, like a bird of prey.

- Red-backed shrike, Lanius collurio
- Red-tailed shrike, Lanius phoenicuroides
- Isabelline shrike, Lanius isabellinus
- Brown shrike, Lanius cristatus (A)
- Bay-backed shrike, Lanius vittatus (A)
- Long-tailed shrike, Lanius schach (A)
- Great gray shrike, Lanius excubitor
- Lesser gray shrike, Lanius minor
- Masked shrike, Lanius nubicus
- Woodchat shrike, Lanius senator

== Crows, jays, and magpies ==
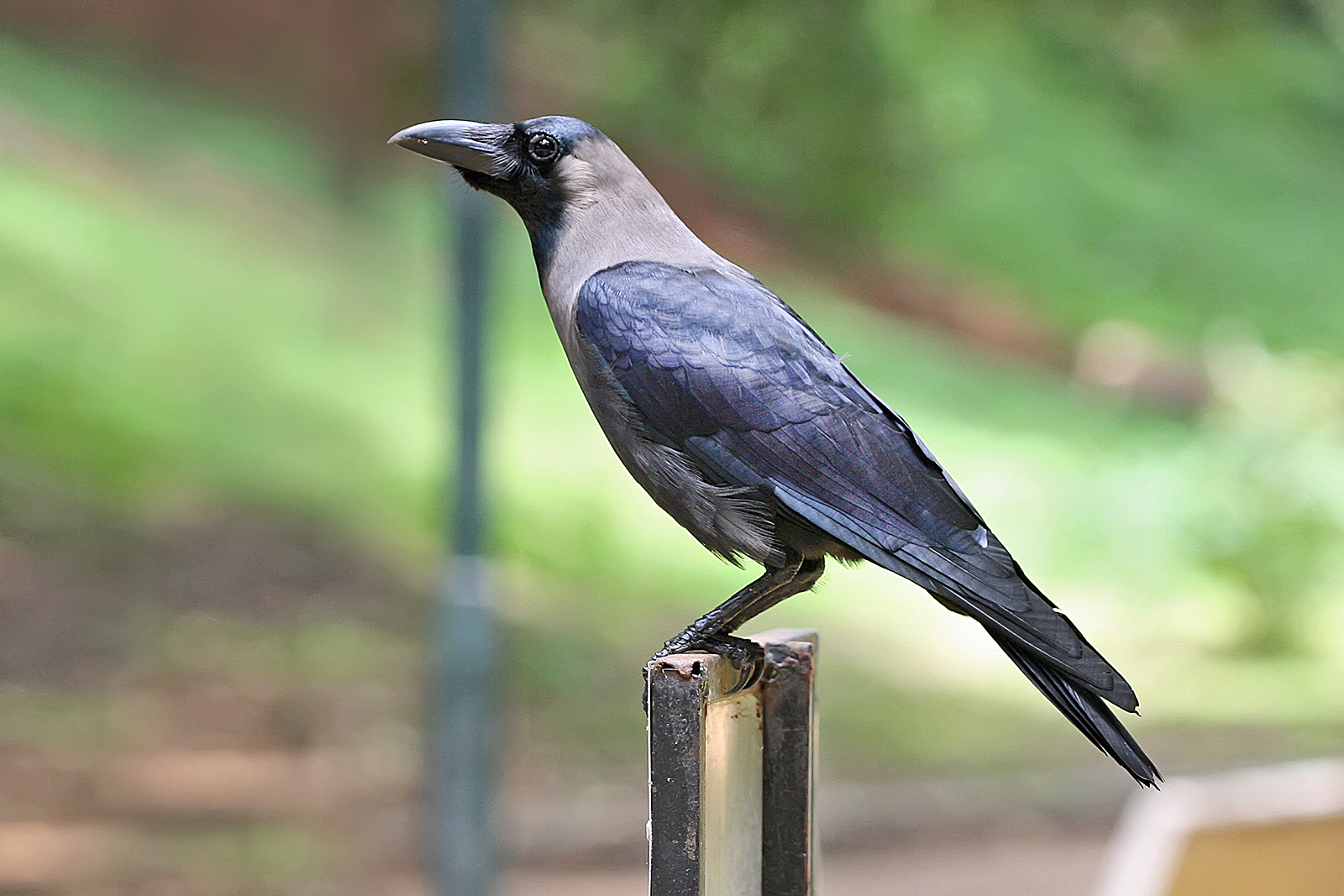
House crow, this species arrived on board ships and is increasingly common.

Order: Passeriformes Family: Corvidae

The family Corvidae includes crows, ravens, jays, choughs, magpies, treepies, nutcrackers and ground jays. Corvids are above average in size among the Passeriformes, and some of the larger species show high levels of intelligence.

- Eurasian magpie, Pica pica (A)
- House crow, Corvus splendens
- Pied crow, Corvus albus (A)
- Brown-necked raven, Corvus ruficollis
- Fan-tailed raven, Corvus rhipidurus

== Penduline-tits ==
Order: Passeriformes Family: Remizidae

The penduline-tits are a group of small passerine birds related to the true tits. They are insectivores.

- Eurasian penduline-tit, Remiz pendulinus (A)
- Black-headed penduline-tit, Remiz macronyx (A)

== Larks ==
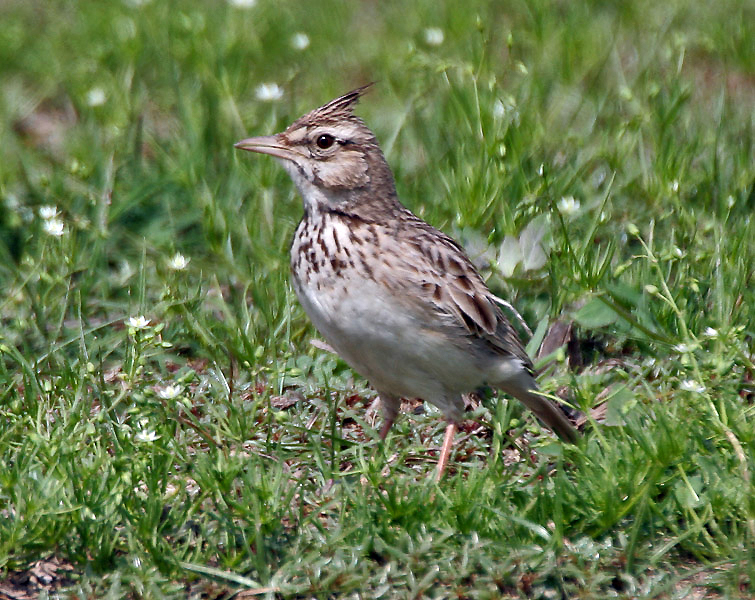
Crested lark, a very common resident.

Order: Passeriformes Family: Alaudidae

Larks are small terrestrial birds with often extravagant songs and display flights. Most larks are fairly dull in appearance. Their food is insects and seeds.

- Greater hoopoe-lark, Alaemon alaudipes
- Thick-billed lark, Ramphocoris clotbey (A)
- Bar-tailed lark, Ammomanes cincturus
- Desert lark, Ammomanes deserti
- Black-crowned sparrow-lark, Eremopterix nigriceps
- Horsfield's bushlark, Mirafra javanica
- Rufous-capped lark, Calandrella eremica
- Greater short-toed lark, Calandrella brachydactyla
- Bimaculated lark, Melanocorypha bimaculata
- Calandra lark, Melanocorypha calandra (A)
- Arabian lark, Eremalauda eremodites
- Mediterranean short-toed lark, Alaudala rufescens
- Turkestan short-toed lark, Alaudala heinei
- Eurasian skylark, Alauda arvensis
- Oriental skylark, Alauda gulgula
- Crested lark, Galerida cristata

== Cisticolas and allies ==
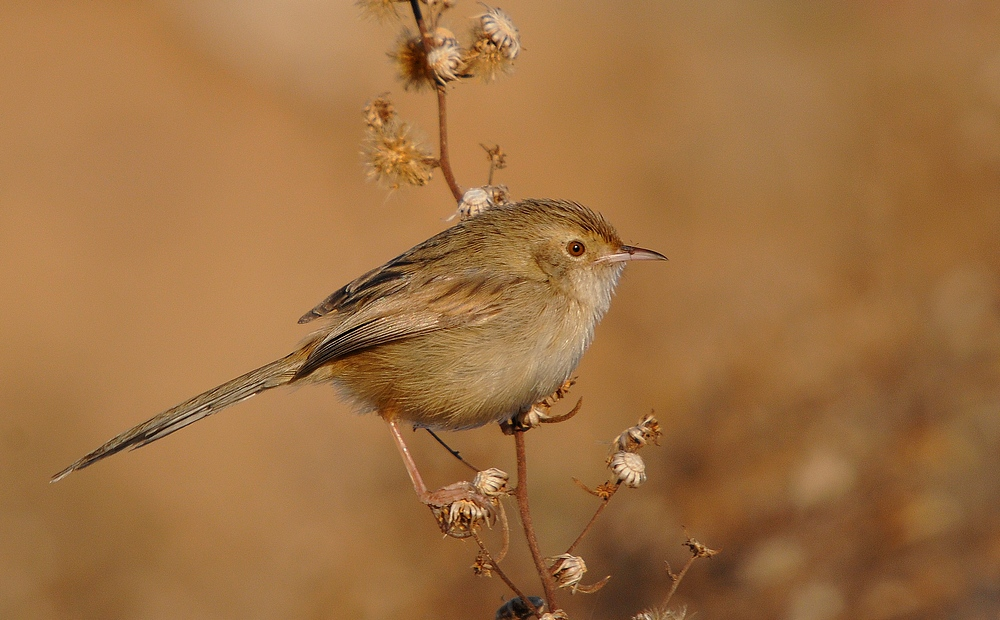
Graceful prinia, very common throughout except for the central desert.

Order: Passeriformes Family: Cisticolidae

The Cisticolidae are warblers found mainly in warmer southern regions of the Old World. They are generally very small birds of drab brown or grey appearance found in open country such as grassland or scrub.

- Graceful prinia, Prinia gracilis
- Delicate prinia, Prinia lepida
- Zitting cisticola, Cisticola juncidis (A)

== Reed warblers and allies ==
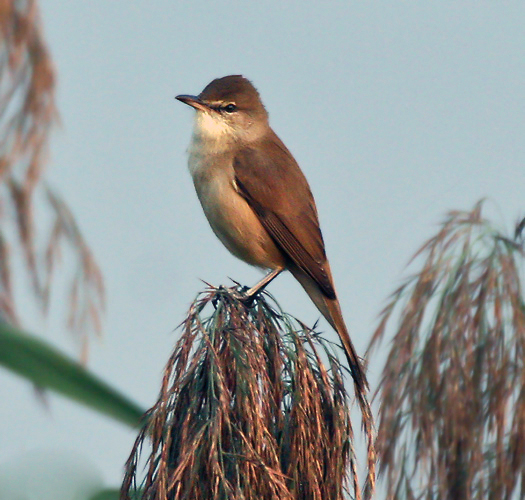
Clamorous reed warbler, breeds in reedbeds and mangroves.

Order: Passeriformes Family: Acrocephalidae

The members of this family are usually rather large for "warblers". Most are rather plain olivaceous brown above with much yellow to beige below. They are usually found in open woodland, reedbeds, or tall grass. The family occurs mostly in southern to western Eurasia and surroundings, but it also ranges far into the Pacific, with some species in Africa.

- Thick-billed warbler, Arundinax aedon (A)
- Booted warbler, Iduna caligata
- Sykes's warbler, Iduna rama
- Eastern olivaceous warbler, Iduna pallida
- Upcher's warbler, Hippolais languida
- Olive-tree warbler, Hippolais olivetorum (A)
- Icterine warbler, Hippolais icterina (A)
- Moustached warbler, Acrocephalus melanopogon (A)
- Sedge warbler, Acrocephalus schoenobaenus
- Paddyfield warbler, Acrocephalus agricola (A)
- Blyth's reed warbler, Acrocephalus dumetorum (A)
- Marsh warbler, Acrocephalus palustris
- Eurasian reed warbler, Acrocephalus scirpaceus
- Great reed warbler, Acrocephalus arundinaceus
- Clamorous reed warbler, Acrocephalus stentoreus

== Grassbirds and allies ==
Order: Passeriformes Family: Locustellidae

Locustellidae are a family of small insectivorous songbirds found mainly in Eurasia, Africa, and the Australian region. They are smallish birds with tails that are usually long and pointed, and tend to be drab brownish or buffy all over.

- River warbler, Locustella fluviatilis (A)
- Savi's warbler, Locustella luscinioides (A)
- Common grasshopper-warbler, Locustella naevia

== Swallows ==
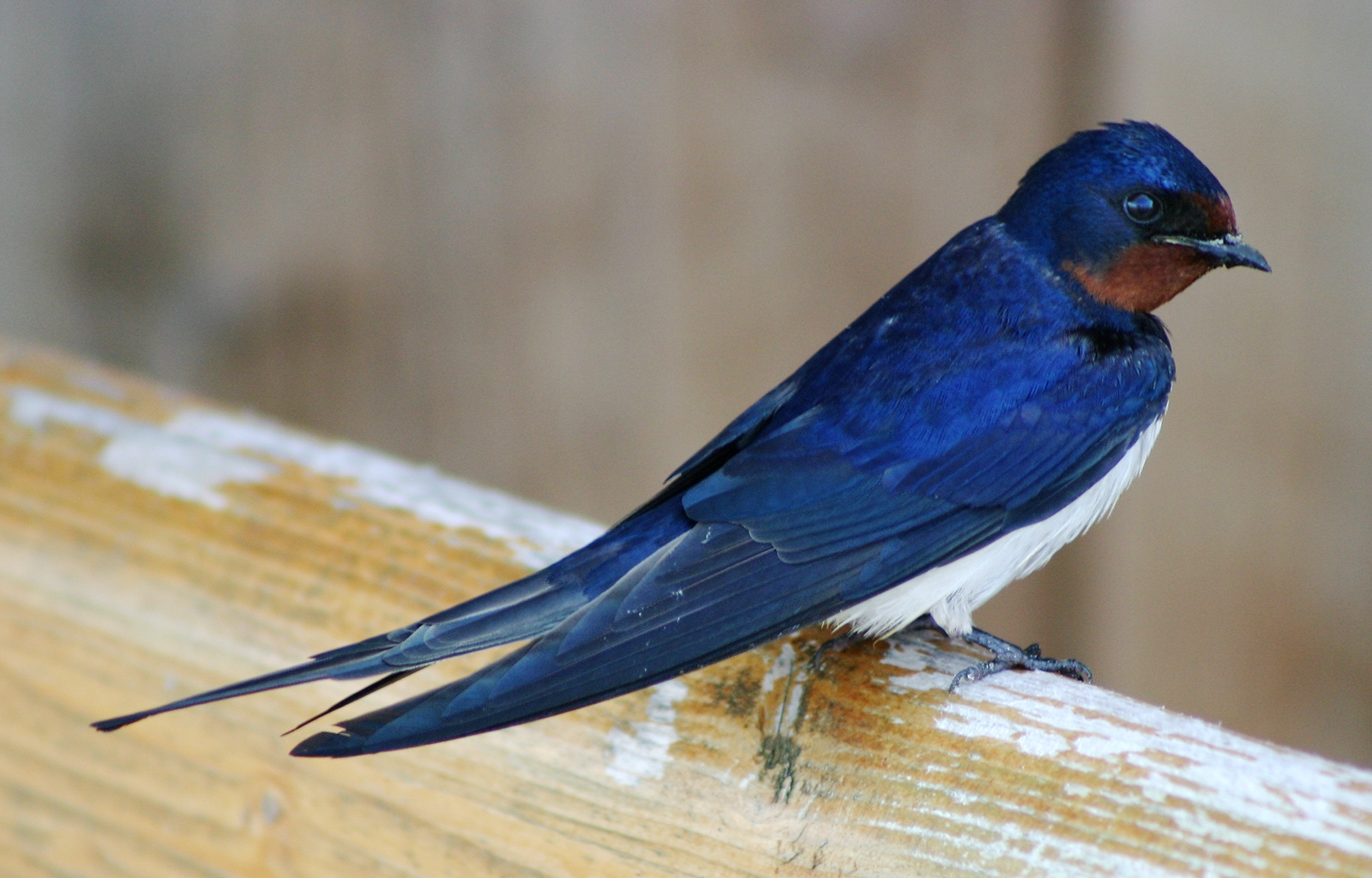
Barn swallow, very common on passage and in winter.

Order: Passeriformes Family: Hirundinidae

The family Hirundinidae is adapted to aerial feeding. They have a slender streamlined body, long pointed wings and a short bill with a wide gape. The feet are adapted to perching rather than walking, and the front toes are partially joined at the base.

- Gray-throated martin, Riparia chinensis
- Bank swallow, Riparia riparia
- Pale sand martin, Riparia diluta (A)
- Banded martin, Neophedina cincta (A)
- Eurasian crag-martin, Ptyonoprogne rupestris
- Rock martin, Ptyonoprogne fuligula
- Barn swallow, Hirundo rustica
- Wire-tailed swallow, Hirundo smithii (A)
- Red-rumped swallow, Cecropis daurica
- Lesser striped swallow, Cecropis abyssinica (A)
- Streak-throated swallow, Petrochelidon fluvicola (A)
- Common house-martin, Delichon urbicum
- Siberian house-martin, Delichon lagopodum (A)

== Bulbuls ==
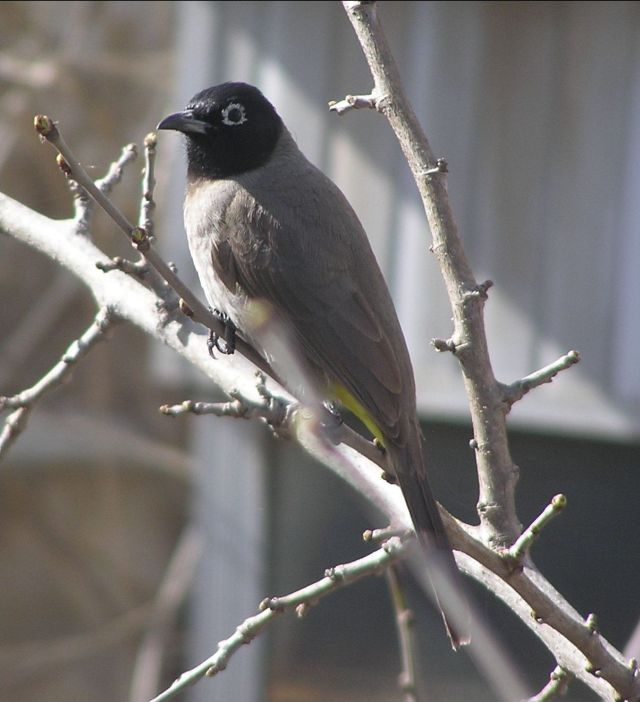
White-spectacled or yellow-vented bulbul, a common and familiar bird of parks and gardens.

Order: Passeriformes Family: Pycnonotidae

Bulbuls are medium-sized songbirds. Some are colourful with yellow, red or orange vents, cheeks, throats or supercilia, but most are drab, with uniform olive-brown to black plumage. Some species have distinct crests.

- Red-vented bulbul, Pycnonotus cafer (I)
- Common bulbul, Pycnonotus barbatus
- White-spectacled bulbul, Pycnonotus xanthopygos
- White-eared bulbul, Pycnonotus leucotis (I)

== Leaf warblers ==
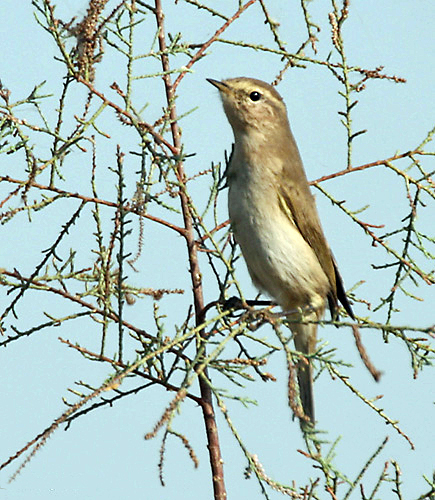
Chiffchaff, common and widespread in winter.

Order: Passeriformes Family: Phylloscopidae

Leaf warblers are a family of small insectivorous birds found mostly in Eurasia and ranging into Wallacea and Africa. The species are of various sizes, often green-plumaged above and yellow below, or more subdued with greyish-green to greyish-brown colours.

- Wood warbler, Phylloscopus sibilatrix
- Eastern Bonelli's warbler, Phylloscopus orientalis (A)
- Yellow-browed warbler, Phylloscopus inornatus (A)
- Hume's warbler, Phylloscopus humei (A)
- Dusky warbler, Phylloscopus fuscatus (A)
- Plain leaf warbler, Phylloscopus neglectus
- Willow warbler, Phylloscopus trochilus
- Mountain chiffchaff, Phylloscopus sindianus (A)
- Common chiffchaff, Phylloscopus collybita
- Iberian chiffchaff, Phylloscopus ibericus (A)
- Green warbler, Phylloscopus nitidus
- Greenish warbler, Phylloscopus trochiloides (A)
- Arctic warbler, Phylloscopus borealis (A)

== Bush warblers and allies ==
Order: Passeriformes Family: Scotocercidae

The members of this family are found throughout Africa, Asia, and Polynesia. Their taxonomy is in flux, and some authorities place some genera in other families.

- Scrub warbler, Scotocerca inquieta
- Cetti's warbler, Cettia cetti (A)

== Sylviid warblers, parrotbills, and allies ==
Order: Passeriformes Family: Sylviidae

The family Sylviidae is a group of small insectivorous passerine birds. They mainly occur as breeding species, as the common name implies, in Europe, Asia and, to a lesser extent, Africa. Most are of generally undistinguished appearance, but many have distinctive songs.

- Eurasian blackcap, Sylvia atricapilla
- Garden warbler, Sylvia borin (A)
- Asian desert warbler, Curruca nana
- Barred warbler, Curruca nisoria
- Lesser whitethroat, Curruca curruca
- Arabian warbler, Curruca leucomelaena
- Eastern Orphean warbler, Curruca crassirostris
- Menetries's warbler, Curruca mystacea
- Sardinian warbler, Curruca melanocephala (A)
- Greater whitethroat, Curruca communis

== White-eyes, yuhinas, and allies ==
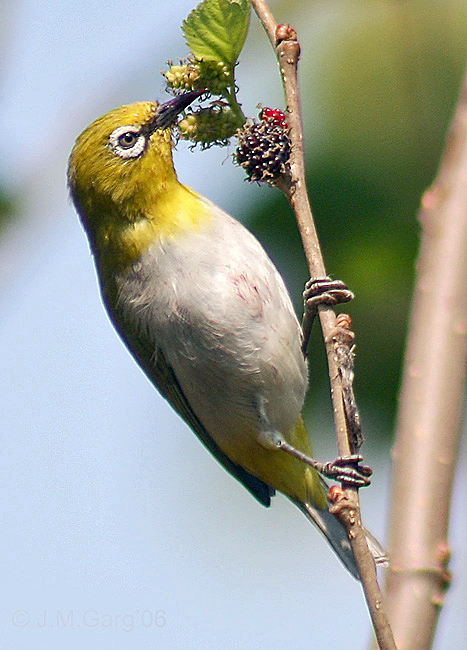
Oriental white-eye, recently found breeding on Mahawt Island.

Order: Passeriformes Family: Zosteropidae

The white-eyes are small and mostly undistinguished, their plumage above being generally some dull colour like greenish-olive, but some species have a white or bright yellow throat, breast or lower parts, and several have buff flanks. As their name suggests, many species have a white ring around each eye.

- Abyssinian white-eye, Zosterops abyssinicus
- Indian white-eye, Zosterops palpebrosus

== Laughingthrushes and allies ==
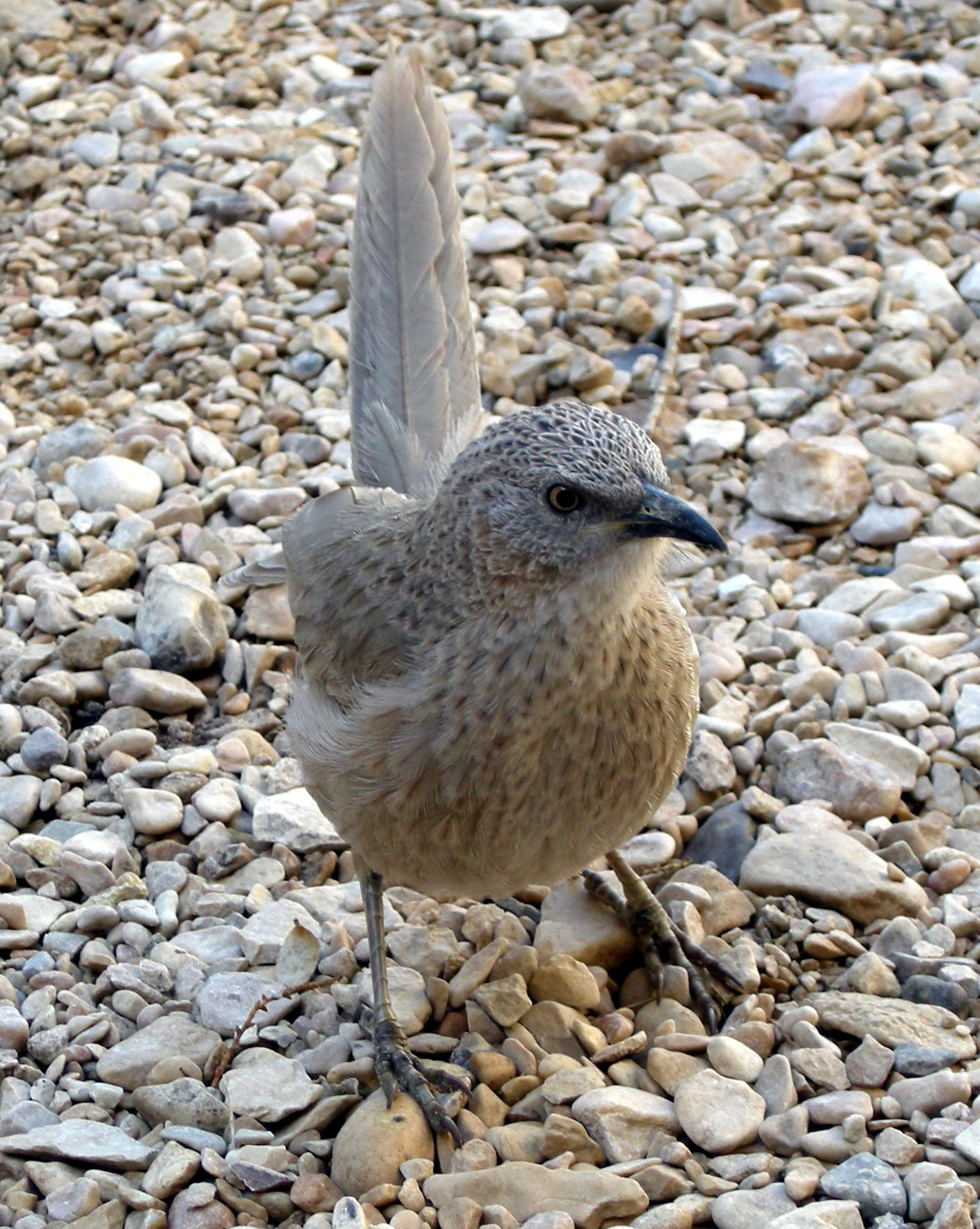
Arabian babbler, often seen in parks and gardens.

Order: Passeriformes Family: Leiothrichidae

The members of this family are diverse in size and colouration, though those of genus Turdoides tend to be brown or greyish. The family is found in Africa, India, and southeast Asia.

- Arabian babbler, Argya squamiceps

== Starlings ==
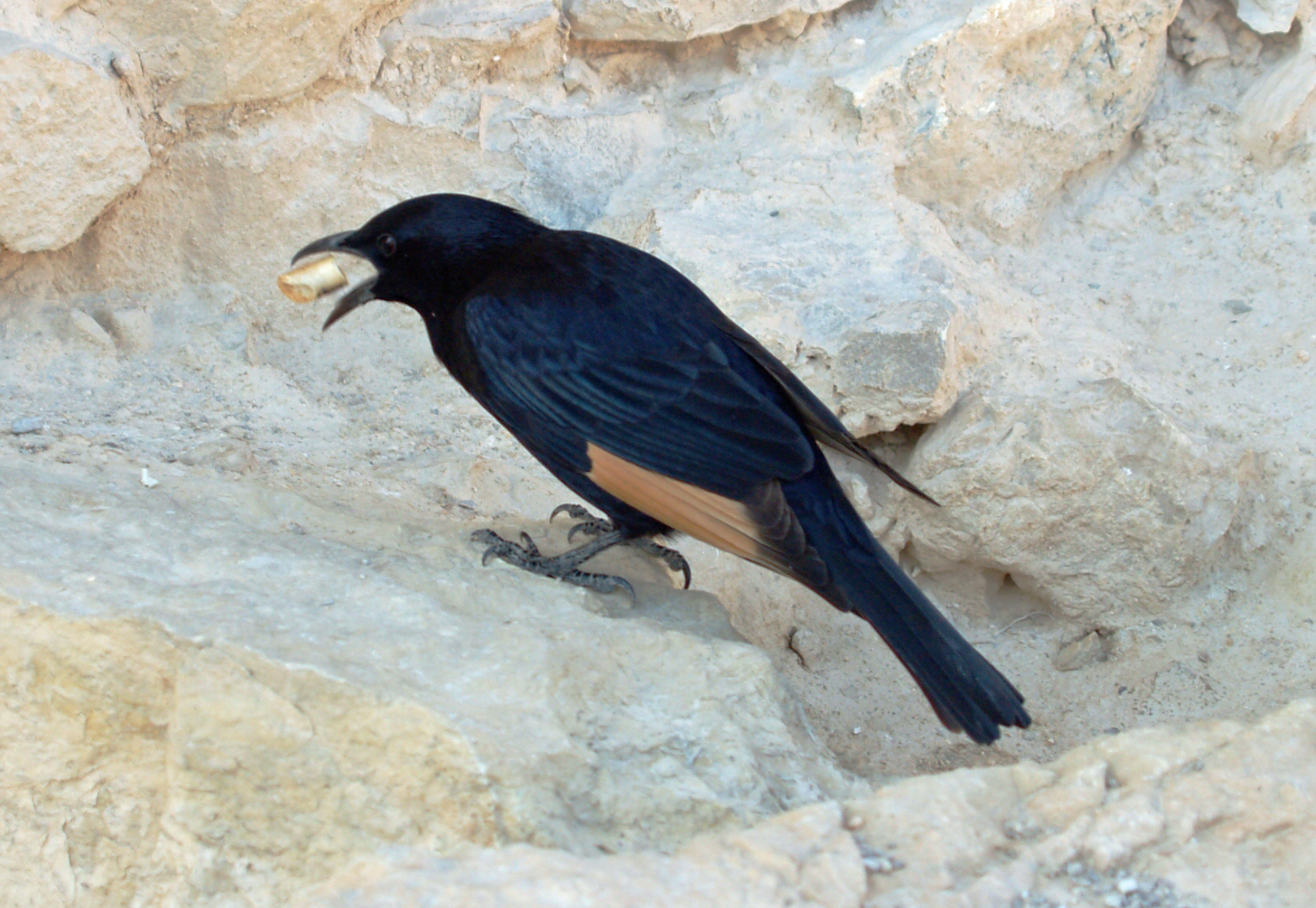
Tristram's starling, common in the mountains of the south.

Order: Passeriformes Family: Sturnidae

Starlings are small to medium-sized passerine birds. Their flight is strong and direct and they are very gregarious. Their preferred habitat is fairly open country. They eat insects and fruit. Plumage is typically dark with a metallic sheen.

- European starling, Sturnus vulgaris
- Wattled starling, Creatophora cinerea
- Rosy starling, Pastor roseus
- Brahminy starling, Sturnia pagodarum
- Chestnut-tailed starling, Sturnia malabarica (A)
- Common myna, Acridotheres tristis (I)
- Bank myna, Acridotheres ginginianus (I)
- Violet-backed starling, Cinnyricinclus leucogaster (A)
- Tristram's starling, Onychognathus tristramii

== Thrushes and allies ==
Order: Passeriformes Family: Turdidae

The thrushes are a group of passerine birds that occur mainly in the Old World. They are plump, soft plumaged, small to medium-sized insectivores or sometimes omnivores, often feeding on the ground. Many have attractive songs.

- White's thrush, Zoothera aurea (A)
- Mistle thrush, Turdus viscivorus (A)
- Song thrush, Turdus philomelos
- Eyebrowed thrush, Turdus obscurus (A)
- Ring ouzel, Turdus torquatus (A)
- Black-throated thrush, Turdus atrogularis
- Red-throated thrush, Turdus ruficollis (A)
- Dusky thrush, Turdus naumanni (A)

== Old World flycatchers ==
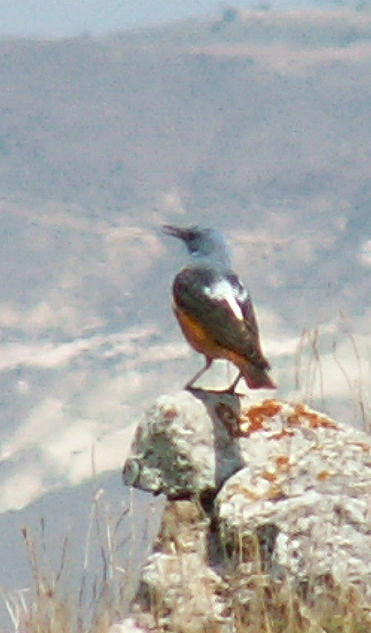
Rufous-tailed rock-thrush, a migrant most often seen in mountainous areas.

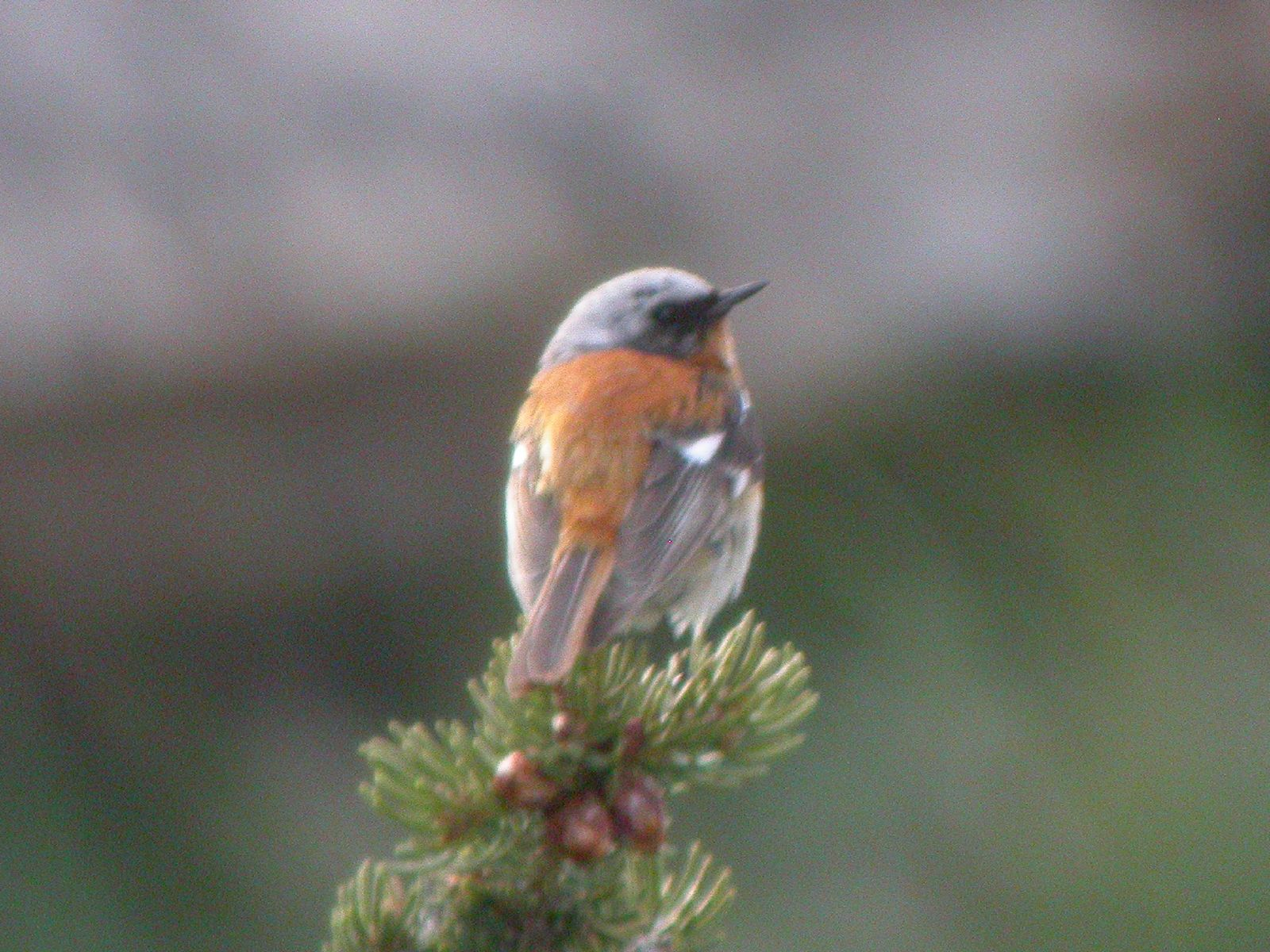
Rufous-backed or Eversmann's redstart, a few winter on the Musandam Peninsula.

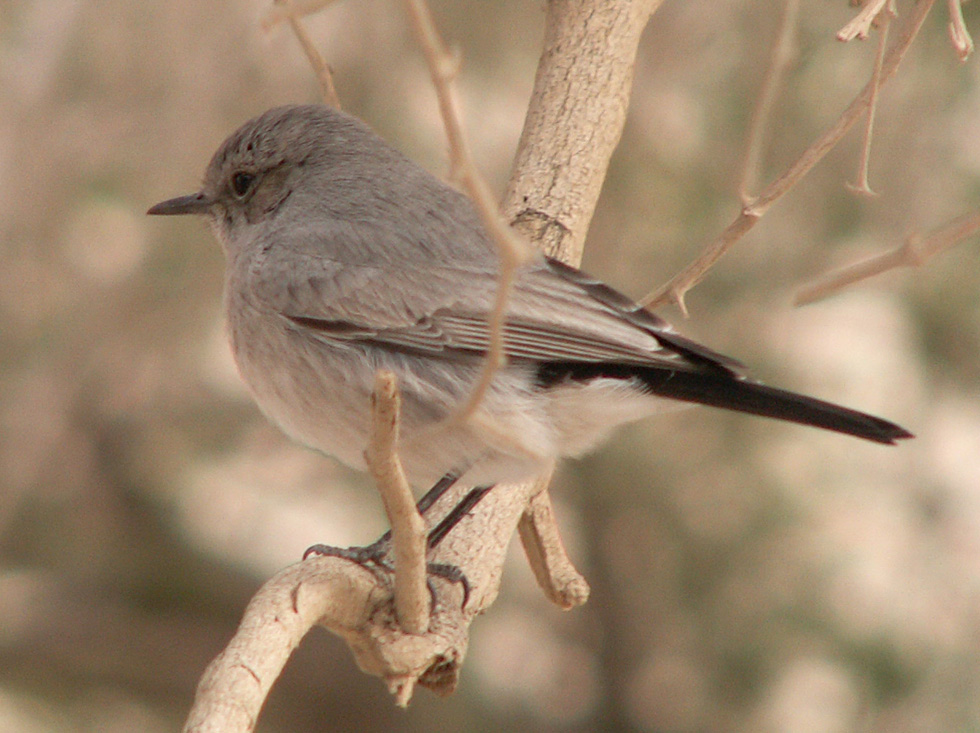
Blackstart, common in the southern mountains.

Order: Passeriformes Family: Muscicapidae

Old World flycatchers are a large group of small passerine birds native to the Old World. They are mainly small arboreal insectivores. The appearance of these birds is highly varied, but they mostly have weak songs and harsh calls.

- Asian brown flycatcher, Muscicapa dauurica (A)
- Spotted flycatcher, Muscicapa striata
- Black scrub-robin, Cercotrichas podobe (A)
- Rufous-tailed scrub-robin, Cercotrichas galactotes
- Blue-and-white flycatcher, Cyanoptila cyanomelana (A)
- European robin, Erithacus rubecula (A)
- White-throated robin, Irania gutturalis
- Thrush nightingale, Luscinia luscinia (A)
- Common nightingale, Luscinia megarhynchos
- Bluethroat, Luscinia svecica
- Taiga flycatcher, Ficedula albicilla (A)
- Red-breasted flycatcher, Ficedula parva
- Semicollared flycatcher, Ficedula semitorquata
- European pied flycatcher, Ficedula hypoleuca (A)
- Rufous-backed redstart, Phoenicurus erythronota
- Common redstart, Phoenicurus phoenicurus
- Black redstart, Phoenicurus ochruros
- Rufous-tailed rock-thrush, Monticola saxatilis
- Blue rock-thrush, Monticola solitarius
- Whinchat, Saxicola rubetra
- European stonechat, Saxicola rubicola
- Siberian stonechat, Saxicola maurus
- Pied bushchat, Saxicola caprata (A)
- Northern wheatear, Oenanthe oenanthe
- Isabelline wheatear, Oenanthe isabellina
- Hooded wheatear, Oenanthe monacha
- Desert wheatear, Oenanthe deserti
- Pied wheatear, Oenanthe pleschanka
- Eastern black-eared wheatear, Oenanthe melanoleuca (A)
- Cyprus wheatear, Oenanthe cypriaca (A)
- Blackstart, Oenanthe melanura
- Variable wheatear, Oenanthe picata
- Hume's wheatear, Oenanthe alboniger
- White-crowned wheatear, Oenanthe leucopyga (A)
- Arabian wheatear, Oenanthe lugentoides
- Abyssinian wheatear, Oenanthe lugubris
- Finsch's wheatear, Oenanthe finschii (A)
- Mourning wheatear, Oenanthe lugens
- Kurdish wheatear, Oenanthe xanthoprymna (A)
- Persian wheatear, Oenanthe chrysopygia

== Hypocolius ==
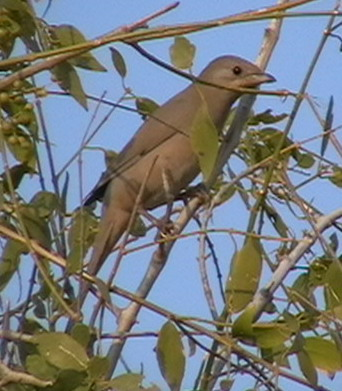
Hypocolius, a winter visitor in small numbers.

Order: Passeriformes Family: Hypocoliidae

The hypocolius is a small Middle Eastern bird with the shape and soft plumage of a waxwing. They are mainly a uniform grey colour except the males have a black triangular mask around their eyes.

- Hypocolius, Hypocolius ampelinus

== Sunbirds and spiderhunters ==
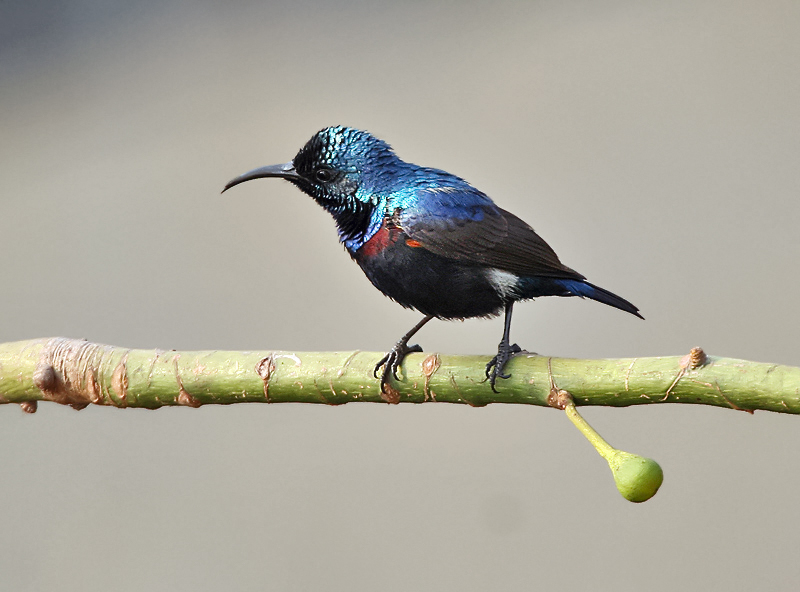
Purple sunbird, common in gardens in the north.

Order: Passeriformes Family: Nectariniidae

The sunbirds and spiderhunters are very small passerine birds which feed largely on nectar, although they will also take insects, especially when feeding young. Flight is fast and direct on their short wings. Most species can take nectar by hovering like a hummingbird, but usually perch to feed.

- Nile Valley sunbird, Hedydipna metallica
- Palestine sunbird, Cinnyris oseus
- Shining sunbird, Cinnyris habessinicus
- Purple sunbird, Cinnyris asiaticus

== Weavers and allies ==
Order: Passeriformes Family: Ploceidae

The weavers are small passerine birds related to the finches. They are seed-eating birds with rounded conical bills. The males of many species are brightly coloured, usually in red or yellow and black, some species show variation in colour only in the breeding season.

- Rueppell's weaver, Ploceus galbula
- Streaked weaver, Ploceus manyar

== Waxbills and allies ==
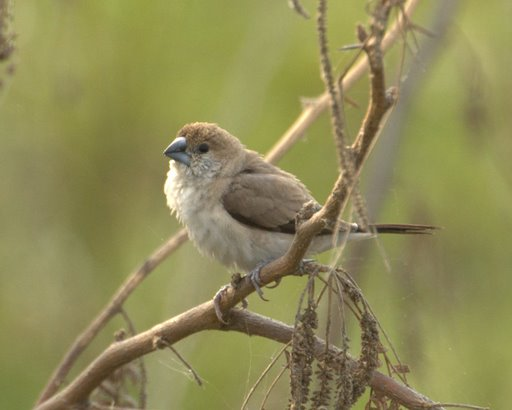
Indian silverbill, a common resident in the north.

Order: Passeriformes Family: Estrildidae

The estrildid finches are small passerine birds of the Old World tropics and Australasia. They are gregarious and often colonial seed eaters with short thick but pointed bills. They are all similar in structure and habits, but have wide variation in plumage colours and patterns.

- Indian silverbill, Euodice malabarica
- African silverbill, Euodice cantans
- Scaly-breasted munia, Lonchura punctulata (I)
- Tricolored munia, Lonchura malacca (A)

== Indigobirds ==
Order: Passeriformes Family: Viduidae

The indigobirds are finch-like species which usually have black or indigo predominating in their plumage. All are brood parasites, which lay their eggs in the nests of estrildid finches.

- Pin-tailed whydah, Vidua macroura (A)

== Accentors ==
Order: Passeriformes Family: Prunellidae

The accentors are in the only bird family, Prunellidae, which is completely endemic to the Palearctic. They are small, fairly drab species superficially similar to sparrows.

- Radde's accentor, Prunella ocularis (A)
- Black-throated accentor, Prunella atrogularis (A)

== Old World sparrows ==
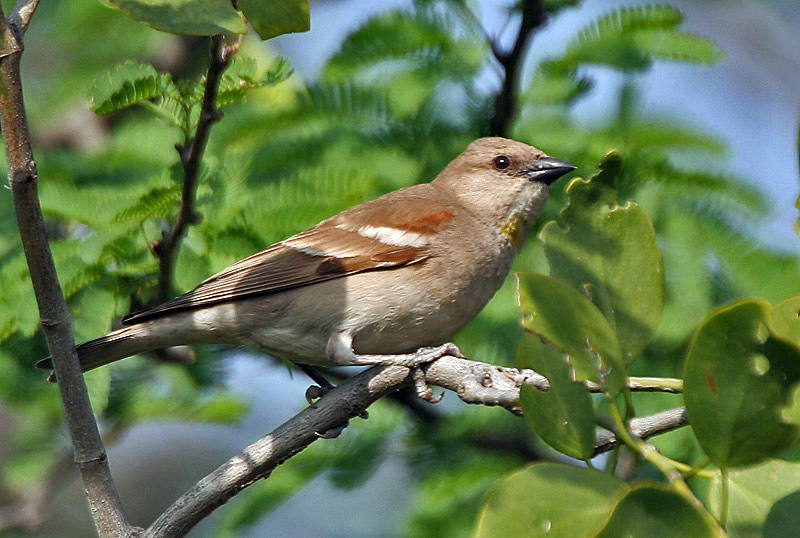
Chestnut-shouldered petronia, breeds in the north but more widespread on passage.

Order: Passeriformes Family: Passeridae

Old World sparrows are small passerine birds. In general, sparrows tend to be small, plump, brown or grey birds with short tails and short powerful beaks. Sparrows are seed eaters, but they also consume small insects.

- House sparrow, Passer domesticus
- Spanish sparrow, Passer hispaniolensis
- Eurasian tree sparrow, Passer montanus (A)
- Yellow-throated sparrow, Gymnoris xanthocollis
- Pale rockfinch, Carpospiza brachydactyla

== Wagtails and pipits ==
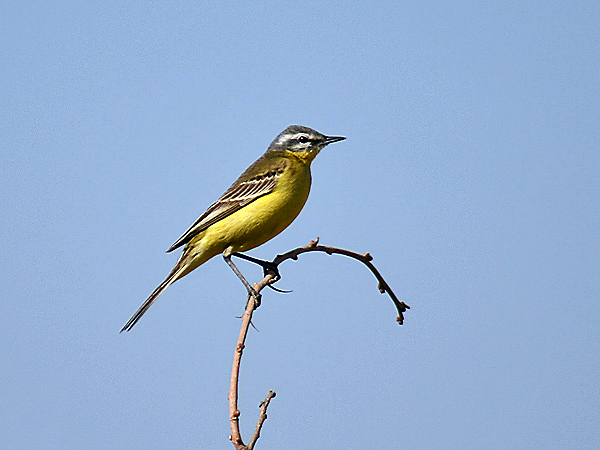
Yellow wagtail, several subspecies occur between August and May.

Order: Passeriformes Family: Motacillidae

Motacillidae is a family of small passerine birds with medium to long tails. They include the wagtails, longclaws and pipits. They are slender, ground feeding insectivores of open country.

- Forest wagtail, Dendronanthus indicus (A)
- Gray wagtail, Motacilla cinerea
- Western yellow wagtail, Motacilla flava
- Eastern yellow wagtail, Motacilla tschutschensis (A)
- Citrine wagtail, Motacilla citreola
- White wagtail, Motacilla alba
- Richard's pipit, Anthus richardi
- Long-billed pipit, Anthus similis
- Blyth's pipit, Anthus godlewskii (A)
- Tawny pipit, Anthus campestris
- Meadow pipit, Anthus pratensis (A)
- Tree pipit, Anthus trivialis
- Olive-backed pipit, Anthus hodgsoni
- Red-throated pipit, Anthus cervinus
- Water pipit, Anthus spinoletta
- American pipit, Anthus rubescens (A)
- Golden pipit, Tmetothylacus tenellus (A)

== Finches, euphonias, and allies ==
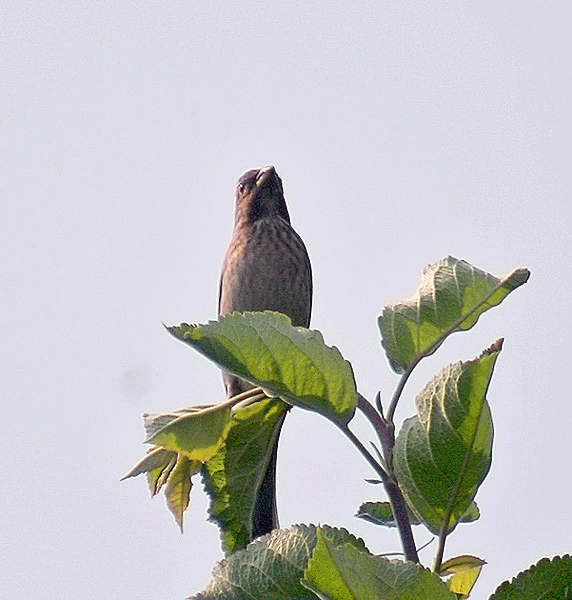
Common rosefinch, small numbers pass through Oman in spring and autumn.

Order: Passeriformes Family: Fringillidae

Finches are seed-eating passerine birds, that are small to moderately large and have a strong beak, usually conical and in some species very large. All have twelve tail feathers and nine primaries. These birds have a bouncing flight with alternating bouts of flapping and gliding on closed wings, and most sing well.

- Common chaffinch, Fringilla coelebs (A)
- Brambling, Fringilla montifringilla
- Common rosefinch, Carpodacus erythrinus
- Trumpeter finch, Bucanetes githaginea
- Arabian grosbeak, Rhynchostruthus percivali
- Yemen serin, Crithagra menachensis
- European goldfinch, Carduelis carduelis (A)
- Eurasian siskin, Spinus spinus (A)

== Old World buntings ==
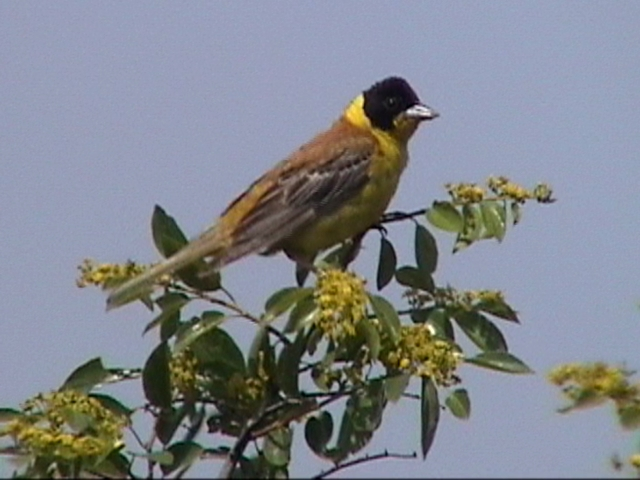
Black-headed bunting, a passage migrant in small numbers.

Order: Passeriformes Family: Emberizidae

The emberizids are a large family of passerine birds. They are seed-eating birds with distinctively shaped bills. Many emberizid species have distinctive head patterns.

- Black-headed bunting, Emberiza melanocephala
- Red-headed bunting, Emberiza bruniceps (A)
- Corn bunting, Emberiza calandra
- Pine bunting, Emberiza leucocephalos (A)
- Gray-necked bunting, Emberiza buchanani (A)
- Cinereous bunting, Emberiza cineracea (A)
- Ortolan bunting, Emberiza hortulana
- Cretzschmar's bunting, Emberiza caesia (A)
- Cinnamon-breasted bunting, Emberiza tahapisi
- Striolated bunting, Emberiza striolata
- Reed bunting, Emberiza schoeniclus (A)
- Yellow-breasted bunting, Emberiza aureola (A)
- Little bunting, Emberiza pusilla (A)
- Rustic bunting, Emberiza rustica (A)

== Field guide ==
- Birds of Oman

== See also ==
- List of birds
- Lists of birds by region
