= List of birds of Egypt =

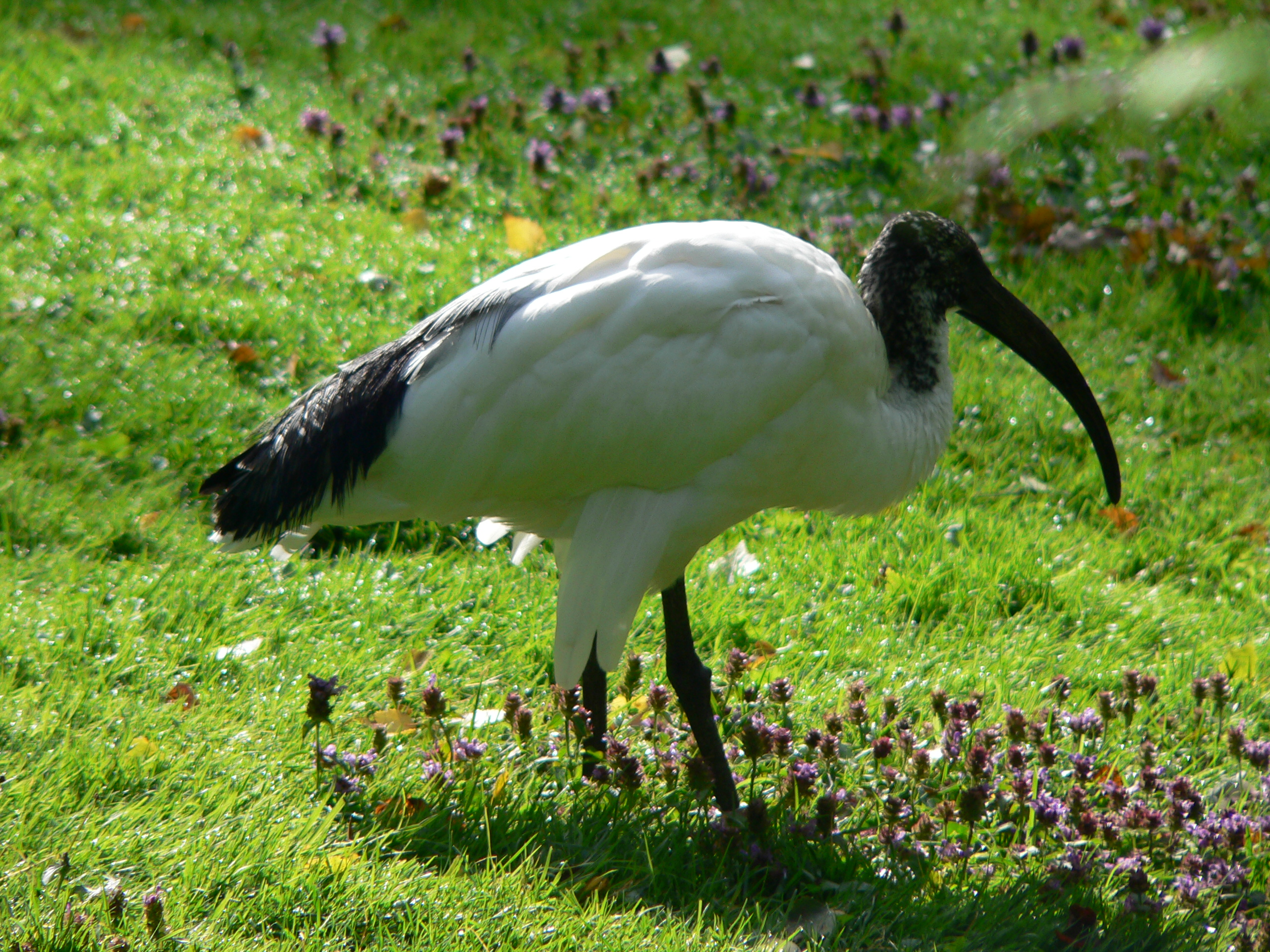
The sacred ibis, a bird that was venerated in Ancient Egypt, is an example of how birds were a significant part of Egyptian culture.

This is a list of the species of birds found in Egypt, a country in north-east Africa. The avifauna of Egypt include a total of 501 species of birds. No species are endemic to Egypt.

This list's taxonomic treatment (designation and sequence of orders, families and species) and nomenclature (common and scientific names) follow the conventions of The Clements Checklist of Birds of the World, 2022 edition. All of the birds below are included in the total bird count for Egypt.

The following tags have been used to highlight several categories. The commonly occurring native species do not fall into any of these categories.

- (A) Accidental - a species that rarely or accidentally occurs in Egypt
- (I) Introduced - a species introduced to Egypt as a consequence, direct or indirect, of human actions
- (Ex) Extirpated - a species that no longer occurs in Egypt although populations exist elsewhere
- (X) Extinct - a species or subspecies that no longer exists.

== Ostriches ==
Order: Struthioniformes Family: Struthionidae

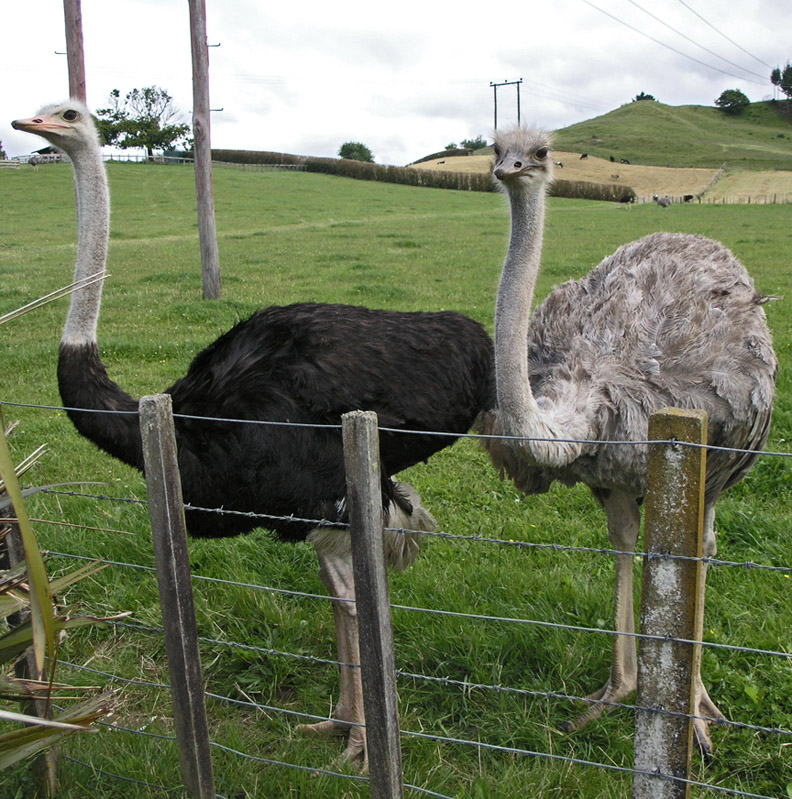
The binomial name for the common ostrich, Struthio camelus, means camel sparrow in Greek, alluding to the animal's long neck.

The ostrich is a flightless bird native to Africa. It is the largest living species of bird. It is distinctive in its appearance, with a long neck and legs and the ability to run at high speeds.

- Common ostrich, Struthio camelus Linnaeus, 1758
  - North African ostrich, Struthio camelus camelus
  - Arabian ostrich, Struthio camelus syriacus (X)

== Ducks, geese, and waterfowl ==
Order: Anseriformes Family: Anatidae

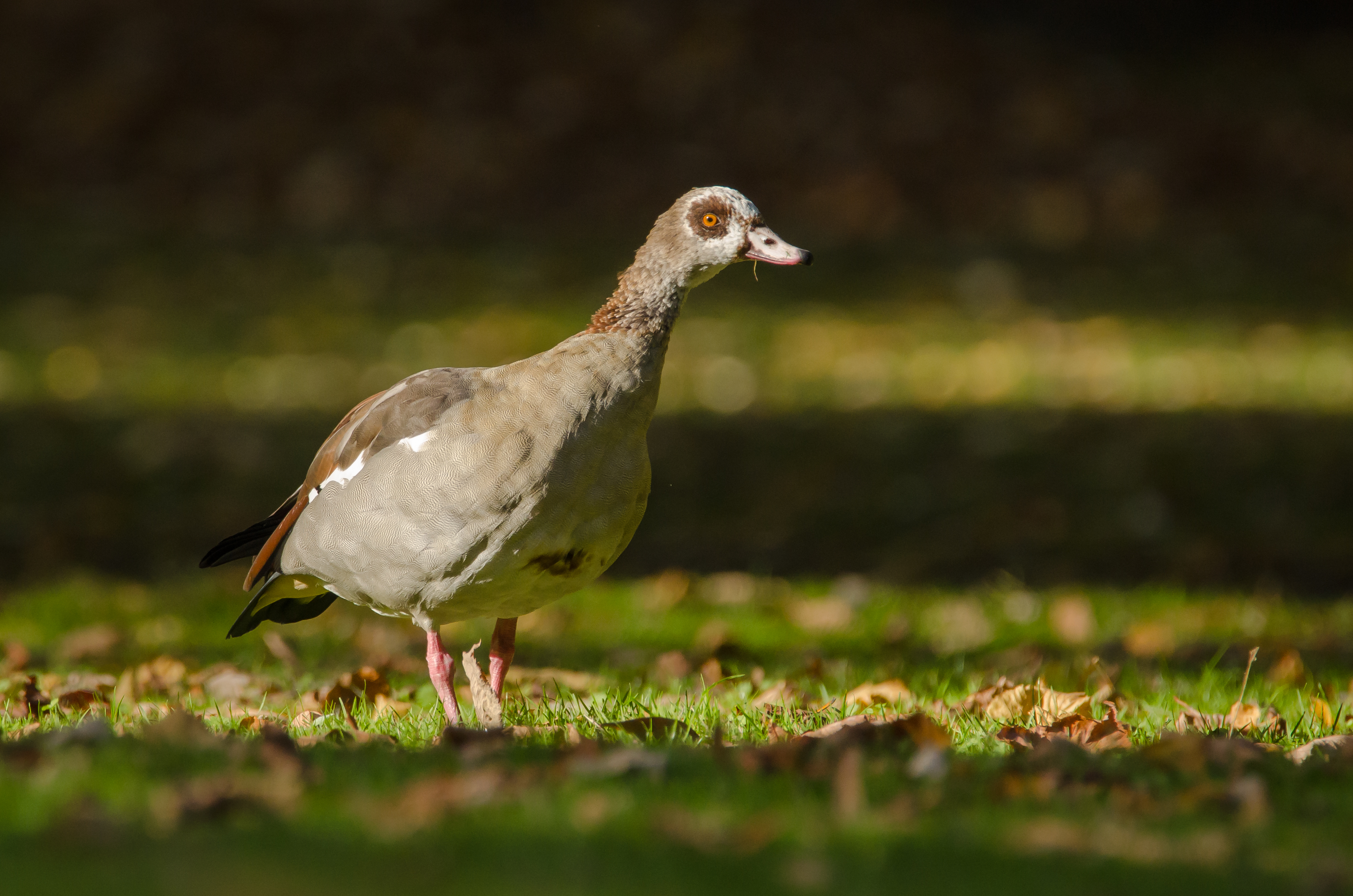
An Egyptian goose

Anatidae includes the ducks and most duck-like waterfowl, such as geese and swans. These birds are adapted to an aquatic existence with webbed feet, flattened bills, and feathers that are excellent at shedding water due to an oily coating.

- Graylag goose, Anser anser (Linnaeus, 1758)
- Greater white-fronted goose, Anser albifrons (Scopoli, 1769)
- Lesser white-fronted goose, Anser erythropus (Linnaeus, 1758) (A)
- Taiga bean-goose, Anser fabalis (Latham, 1787) (A)
- Brant, Branta bernicla (Linnaeus, 1758) (A)
- Barnacle goose, Branta leucopsis (Bechstein, 1803) (A)
- Red-breasted goose, Branta ruficollis (Pallas, 1769) (A)
- Mute swan, Cygnus olor (Gmelin, JF, 1789)
- Whooper swan, Cygnus cygnus (Linnaeus, 1758) (A)
- Egyptian goose, Alopochen aegyptiaca (Linnaeus, 1766)
- Ruddy shelduck, Tadorna ferruginea (Pallas, 1764)
- Common shelduck, Tadorna tadorna (Linnaeus, 1758)
- Spur-winged goose, Plectropterus gambensis (Linnaeus, 1766) (I)
- Garganey, Spatula querquedula (Linnaeus, 1758)
- Blue-winged teal, Spatula discors (Linnaeus, 1766) (A)
- Northern shoveler, Spatula clypeata (Linnaeus, 1758)
- Gadwall, Mareca strepera (Linnaeus, 1758)
- Eurasian wigeon, Mareca penelope (Linnaeus, 1758)
- Mallard, Anas platyrhynchos Linnaeus, 1758
- Northern pintail, Anas acuta Linnaeus, 1758
- Green-winged teal, Anas crecca Linnaeus, 1758
- Marbled teal, Marmaronetta angustirostris (Ménétriés, 1832)
- Red-crested pochard, Netta rufina (Pallas, 1773)
- Common pochard, Aythya ferina (Linnaeus, 1758)
- Ferruginous duck, Aythya nyroca (Güldenstädt, 1770)
- Tufted duck, Aythya fuligula (Linnaeus, 1758)
- Velvet scoter, Melanitta fusca (Linnaeus, 1758) (A)
- Smew, Mergellus albellus (Linnaeus, 1758)
- Red-breasted merganser, Mergus serrator Linnaeus, 1758
- Ruddy duck, Oxyura jamaicensis (Gmelin, JF, 1789) (I)
- White-headed duck, Oxyura leucocephala (Scopoli, 1769)

== Pheasants, grouse, and allies ==
Order: Galliformes Family: Phasianidae

The Phasianidae are a family of terrestrial birds. In general, they are plump (although they vary in size) and have broad, relatively short wings.

- Sand partridge, Ammoperdix heyi (Temminck, 1825)
- Common quail, Coturnix coturnix (Linnaeus, 1758); Ancient Egyptian: pcr.t > Coptic: pere (meaning unknown)
- Barbary partridge, Alectoris barbara (Bonnaterre, 1790) "aegypticus" (Siwa, marsa matruah)
- Chukar, Alectoris chukar (Gray, JE, 1830)

== Flamingos ==
Order: Phoenicopteriformes Family: Phoenicopteridae

Flamingos are gregarious wading birds, usually 3 to 5 feet (0.9 to 1.5 m) tall, found in both the Western and Eastern Hemispheres. Flamingos filter-feed on shellfish and algae. Their oddly shaped beaks are specially adapted to separate mud and silt from the food they consume and, uniquely, are used upside-down.

- Greater flamingo, Phoenicopterus roseus Pallas, 1811 (Ancient Egyptian name: dSr "reddish one"; Coptic: eteSi)
- Lesser flamingo, Phoeniconaias minor (Geoffroy Saint-Hilaire, É, 1798) (A)

== Grebes ==
Order: Podicipediformes Family: Podicipedidae

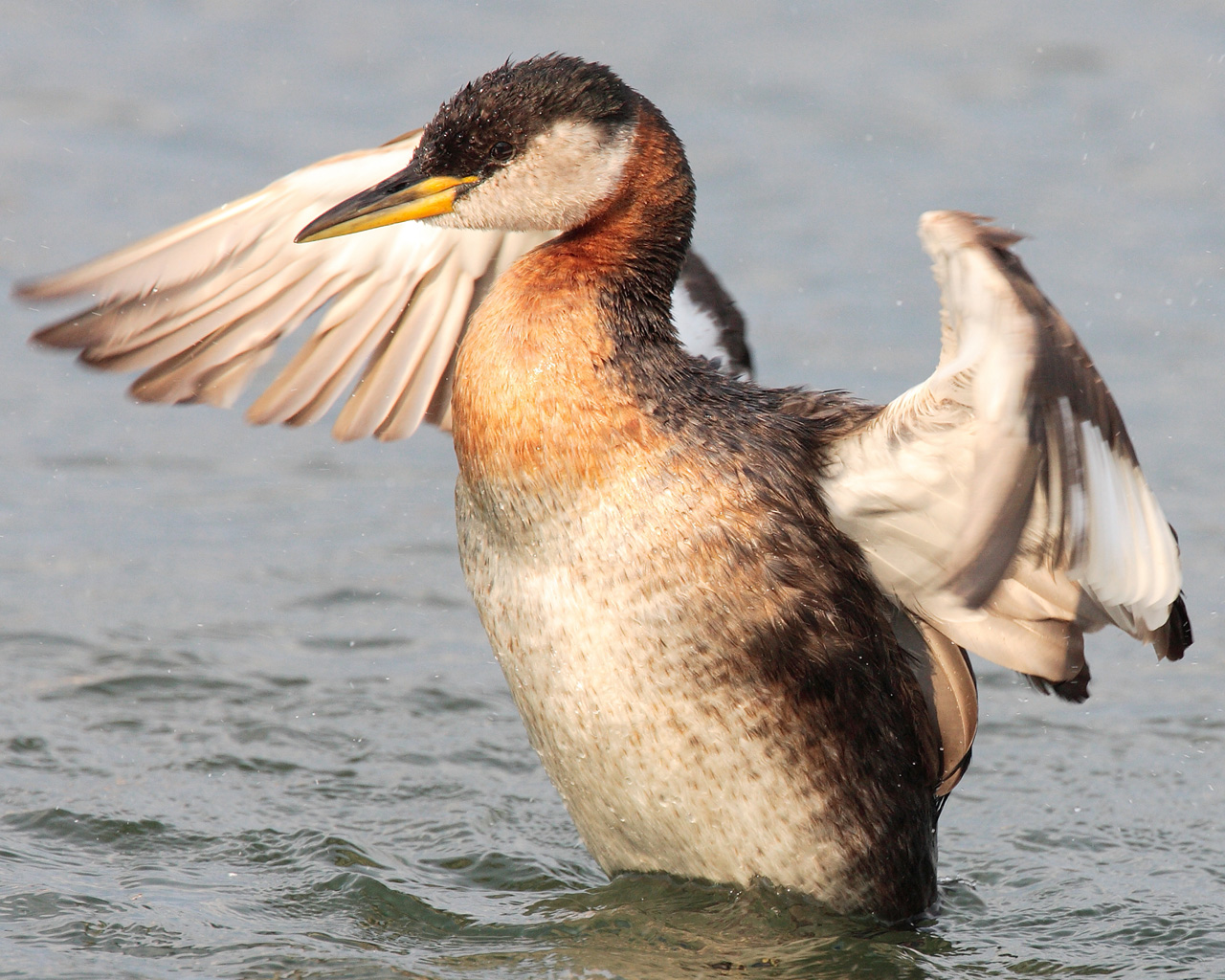
A red-necked grebe flapping its wings, which are, on average, 60 centimetres (24 inch) in length

Grebes are small to medium-large freshwater diving birds. They have lobed toes and are excellent swimmers and divers. However, they have their feet placed far back on the body, making them quite ungainly on land.

- Little grebe, Tachybaptus ruficollis (Pallas, 1764)
- Red-necked grebe, Podiceps grisegena (Boddaert, 1783) (A)
- Great crested grebe, Podiceps cristatus (Linnaeus, 1758)
- Eared grebe, Podiceps nigricollis Brehm, CL, 1831

== Pigeons and doves ==
Order: Columbiformes Family: Columbidae

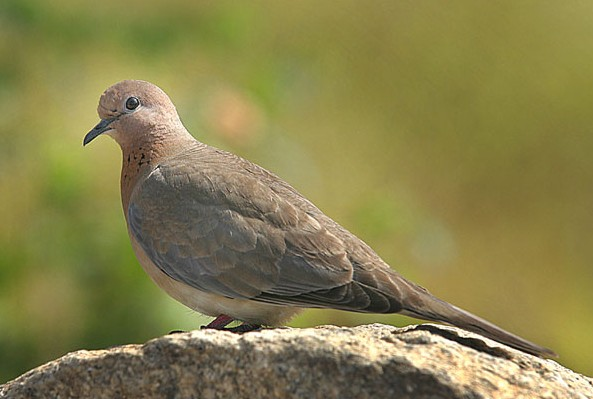
A perched Laughing dove

Pigeons and doves are stout-bodied birds with short necks and short slender bills with a fleshy cere.

- Rock pigeon, Columba livia Gmelin, JF, 1789; Ancient Egyptian sSmt(y) "one of turquoise colour" (?)
- Stock dove, Columba oenas Linnaeus, 1758
- Common wood-pigeon, Columba palumbus Linnaeus, 1758 (A)
- European turtle-dove, Streptopelia turtur turtur; Ancient Egyptian: mnw.t (meaning unknown)
- Oriental turtle-dove, Streptopelia orientalis (Latham, 1790) (A)
- Eurasian collared-dove, Streptopelia decaocto (Frivaldszky, 1838)
- African collared-dove, Streptopelia roseogrisea (Sundevall, 1857)
- Mourning collared-dove, Streptopelia decipiens (Hartlaub & Finsch, 1870) (A)
- Laughing dove, Spilopelia senegalensis (Linnaeus, 1766); Ancient Egyptian: cb3 "glittering, shining one"
- Namaqua dove, Oena capensis (Linnaeus, 1766)
- Bruce's green-pigeon, Treron waalia (Meyer, FAA, 1793) (A)

== Sandgrouse ==
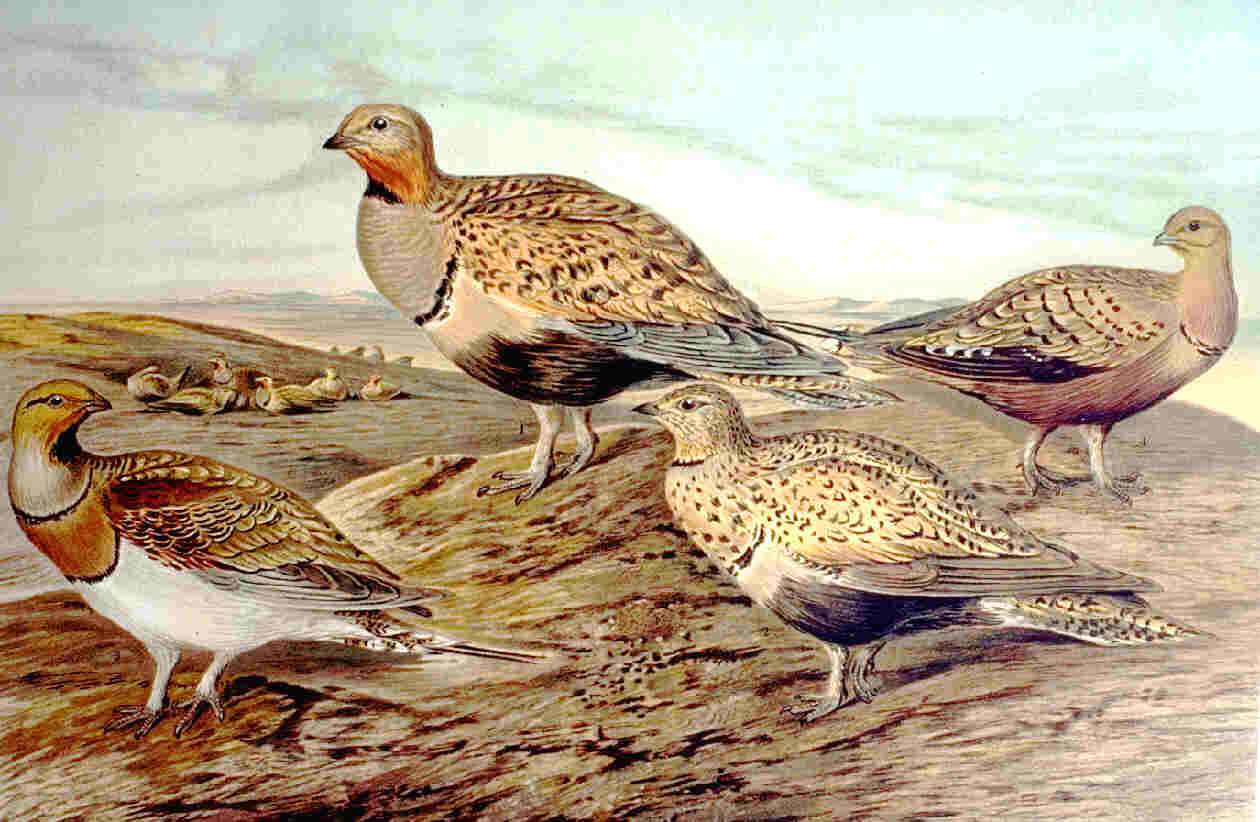
Depiction of several black-bellied sandgrouses

Order: Pterocliformes Family: Pteroclidae

Sandgrouse have small, pigeon like heads and necks, but sturdy compact bodies. They have long pointed wings and sometimes tails and a fast direct flight. Flocks fly to watering holes at dawn and dusk. Their legs are feathered down to the toes.

- Pin-tailed sandgrouse, Pterocles alchata (Linnaeus, 1766) (A)
- Chestnut-bellied sandgrouse, Pterocles exustus Temminck, 1825 (A)
- Spotted sandgrouse, Pterocles senegallus (Linnaeus, 1771)
- Black-bellied sandgrouse, Pterocles orientalis (Linnaeus, 1758)
- Crowned sandgrouse, Pterocles coronatus Lichtenstein, MHC, 1823
- Lichtenstein's sandgrouse, Pterocles lichtensteinii Temminck, 1825

== Bustards ==
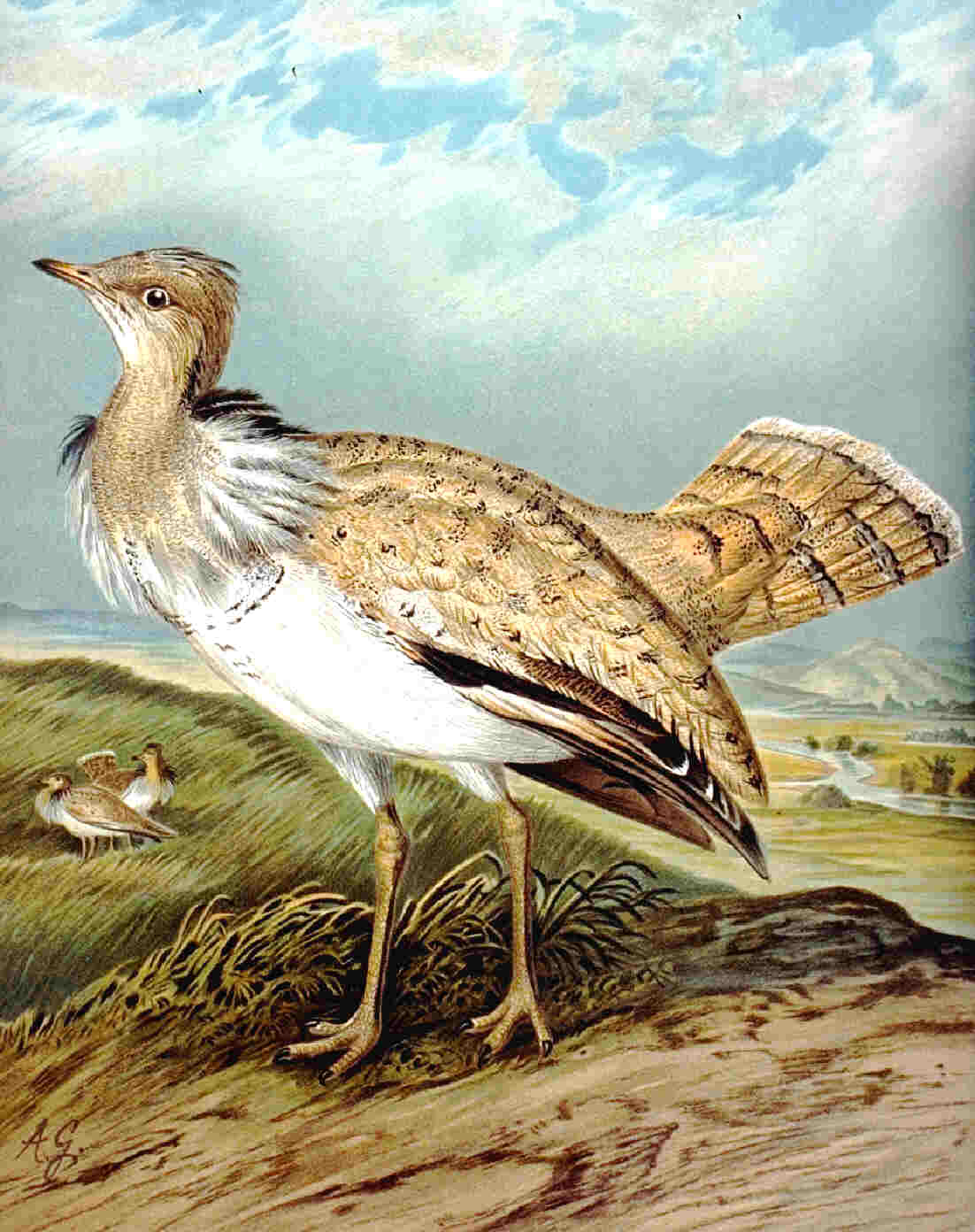
Depiction of a houbara bustard

Order: Otidiformes Family: Otididae

Bustards are large terrestrial birds mainly associated with dry open country and steppes in the Old World. They are omnivorous and nest on the ground. They walk steadily on strong legs and big toes, pecking for food as they go. They have long broad wings with "fingered" wingtips and striking patterns in flight. Many have interesting mating displays.

- Great bustard, Otis tarda Linnaeus, 1758 (A)
- Houbara bustard, Chlamydotis undulata (Jacquin, 1784)
- MacQueen's bustard, Chlamydotis macqueenii (Gray, JE, 1832)
- Little bustard, Tetrax tetrax (Linnaeus, 1758) (Ex) (Note: Listed as extirpated per source, but no other sources put Egypt in the species' range.)

== Cuckoos ==
Order: Cuculiformes Family: Cuculidae

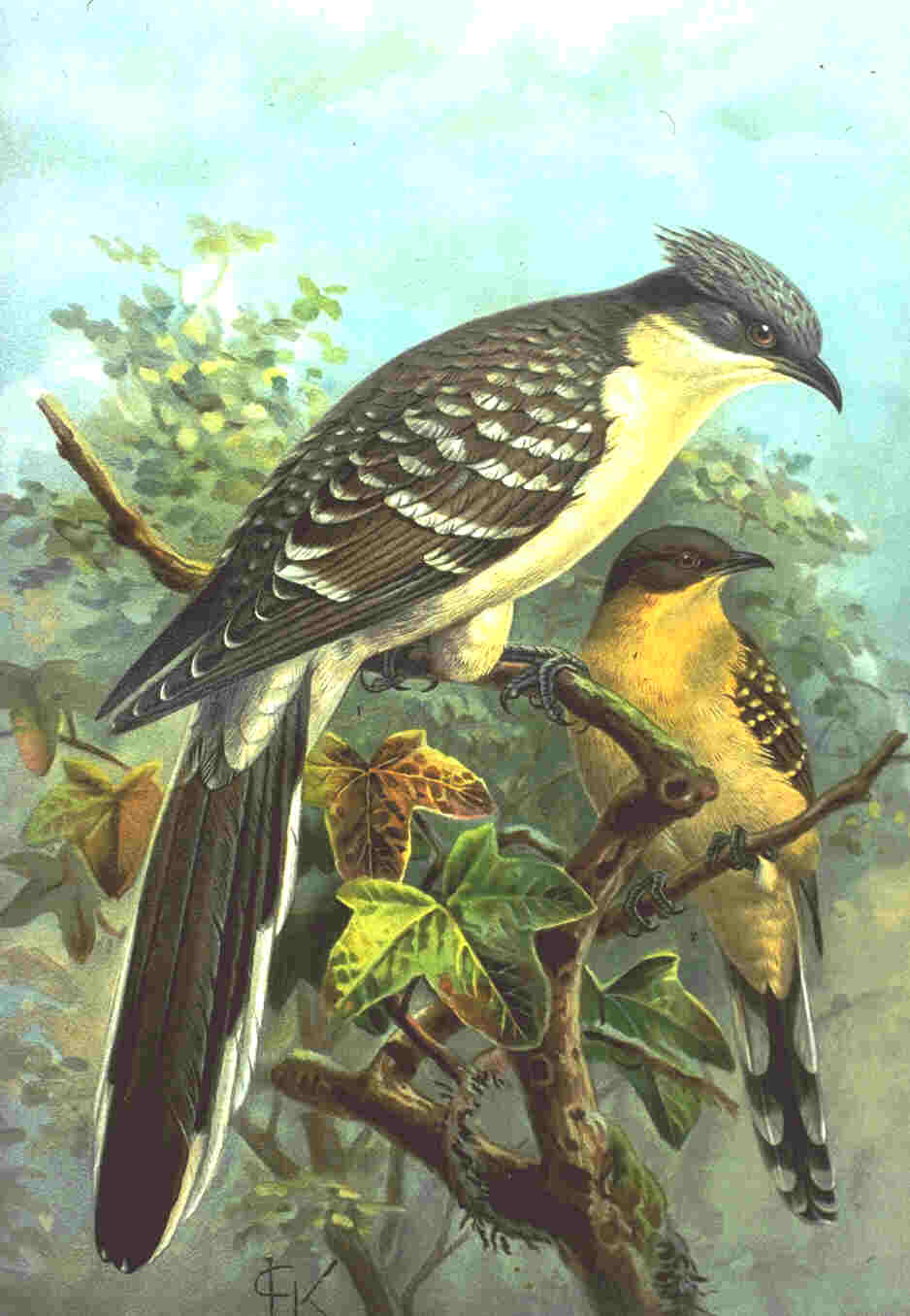
Picture of a great spotted cuckoo perched in a tree

The family Cuculidae includes cuckoos, roadrunners and anis. These birds are of variable size with slender bodies, long tails and strong legs.

- Senegal coucal, Centropus senegalensis (Linnaeus, 1766)
- Great spotted cuckoo, Clamator glandarius (Linnaeus, 1758)
- African cuckoo, Cuculus gularis Stephens, 1815
- Common cuckoo, Cuculus canorus Linnaeus, 1758

== Nightjars and allies ==
Order: Caprimulgiformes Family: Caprimulgidae

Nightjars are medium-sized nocturnal birds that usually nest on the ground. They have long wings, short legs and very short bills. Most have small feet, of little use for walking, and long pointed wings. Their soft plumage is camouflaged to resemble bark or leaves.

- Eurasian nightjar, Caprimulgus europaeus Linnaeus, 1758
- Egyptian nightjar, Caprimulgus aegyptius Lichtenstein, MHC, 1823
- Nubian nightjar, Caprimulgus nubicus Lichtenstein, MHC, 1823 (A)

== Swifts ==
Order: Caprimulgiformes Family: Apodidae

Swifts are small birds which spend the majority of their lives flying. These birds have very short legs and never settle voluntarily on the ground, perching instead only on vertical surfaces. Many swifts have long swept-back wings which resemble a crescent or boomerang.

- Alpine swift, Tachymarptis melba (Linnaeus, 1758)
- Common swift, Apus apus (Linnaeus, 1758)
- Pallid swift, Apus pallidus (Shelley, 1870)
- Little swift, Apus affinis (Gray, JE, 1830)

== Rails, gallinules, and coots ==
Order: Gruiformes Family: Rallidae

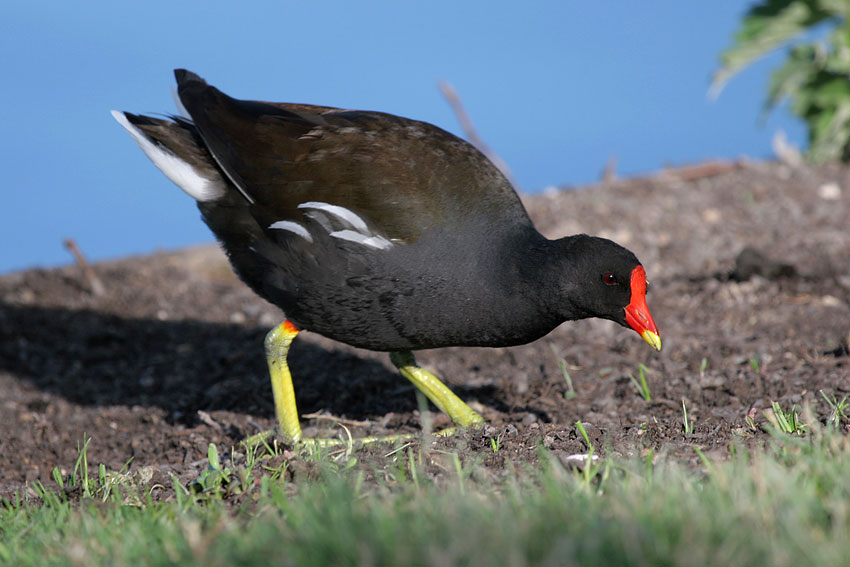
Eurasian moorhen

Rallidae is a large family of small to medium-sized birds which includes the rails, crakes, coots and gallinules. Typically they inhabit dense vegetation in damp environments near lakes, swamps or rivers. In general they are shy and secretive birds, making them difficult to observe. Most species have strong legs and long toes which are well adapted to soft uneven surfaces. They tend to have short, rounded wings and to be weak fliers.

- Water rail, Rallus aquaticus Linnaeus, 1758
- Corn crake, Crex crex (Linnaeus, 1758)
- Spotted crake, Porzana porzana (Linnaeus, 1766)
- Eurasian moorhen, Gallinula chloropus (Linnaeus, 1758); Ancient Egyptian: sbḥ "one who cries out" or "laments"
- Lesser moorhen, Paragallinula angulata (Sundevall, 1850)
- Eurasian coot, Fulica atra Linnaeus, 1758
- Allen's gallinule, Porphyrio alleni Thomson, 1842 (A)
- African swamphen, Porphyrio madagascariensis (Latham, 1801)
- Little crake, Zapornia parva (Scopoli, 1769)
- Baillon's crake, Zapornia pusilla (Pallas, 1776)

== Cranes ==
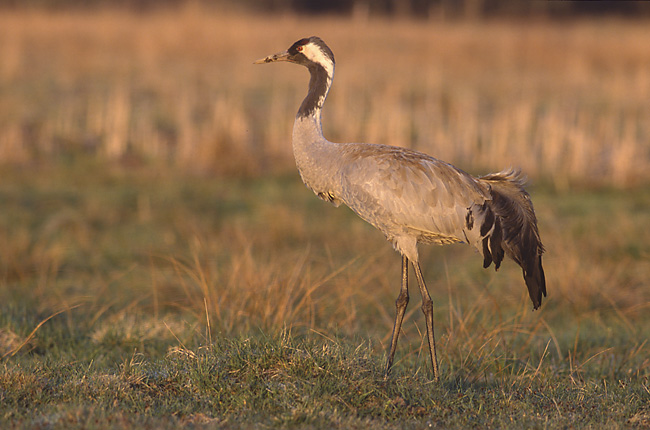
The common crane

Order: Gruiformes Family: Gruidae

Cranes are large, long-legged and long-necked birds. Unlike the similar-looking but unrelated herons, cranes fly with necks outstretched, not pulled back. Most have elaborate and noisy courting displays or "dances".

- Demoiselle crane, Anthropoides virgo; Ancient Egyptian wDc "splitter" (?)
- Common crane, Grus grus (Linnaeus, 1758); Ancient Egyptian: D3.t "the one stretching/reaching" or "borer"

== Thick-knees ==
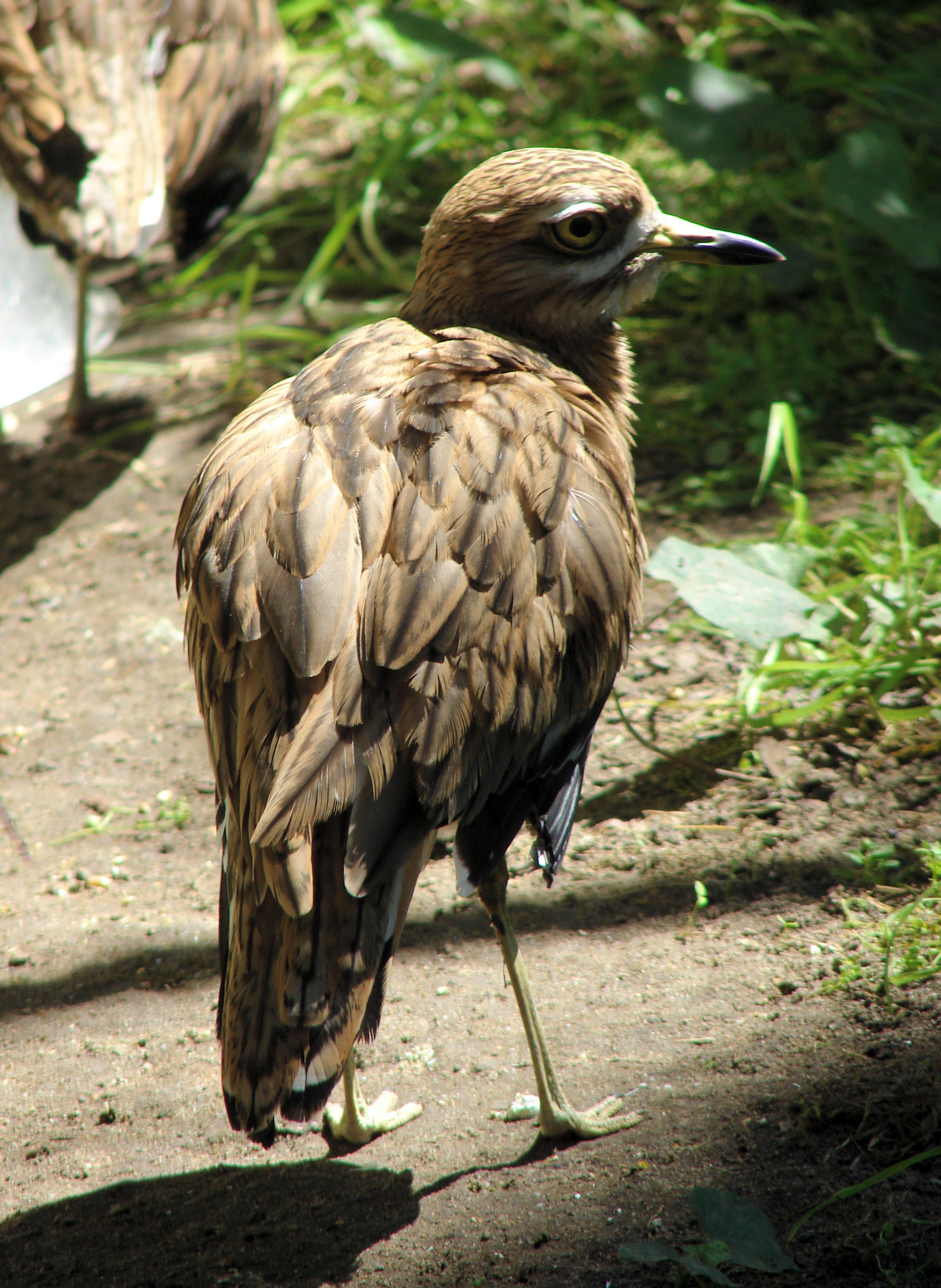
A Eurasian thick-knee

Order: Charadriiformes Family: Burhinidae

The thick-knees are a group of largely tropical waders in the family Burhinidae. They are found worldwide within the tropical zone, with some species also breeding in temperate Europe and Australia. They are medium to large waders with strong black or yellow-black bills, large yellow eyes and cryptic plumage. Despite being classed as waders, most species have a preference for arid or semi-arid habitats.

- Eurasian thick-knee, Burhinus oedicnemus (Linnaeus, 1758)
- Senegal thick-knee, Burhinus senegalensis (Swainson, 1837)

== Egyptian plover ==
Order: Charadriiformes Family: Pluvianidae

The Egyptian plover is found across equatorial Africa and along the Nile River. It has a mutualistic relationship with Nile crocodiles by eating food and parasites from their opened mouths. This is also reflected in the Ancient Egyptian name of the bird according to a Demotic dreambook (papyrus Vienna D 6104): b3k msh "servant of the crocodile".

- Egyptian plover, Pluvianus aegyptius (Linnaeus, 1758) (A)

== Stilts and avocets ==
Order: Charadriiformes Family: Recurvirostridae

Recurvirostridae is a family of large wading birds, which includes the avocets and stilts. The avocets have long legs and long up-curved bills. The stilts have extremely long legs and long, thin, straight bills.

- Black-winged stilt, Himantopus himantopus (Linnaeus, 1758)
- Pied avocet, Recurvirostra avosetta Linnaeus, 1758

== Oystercatchers ==
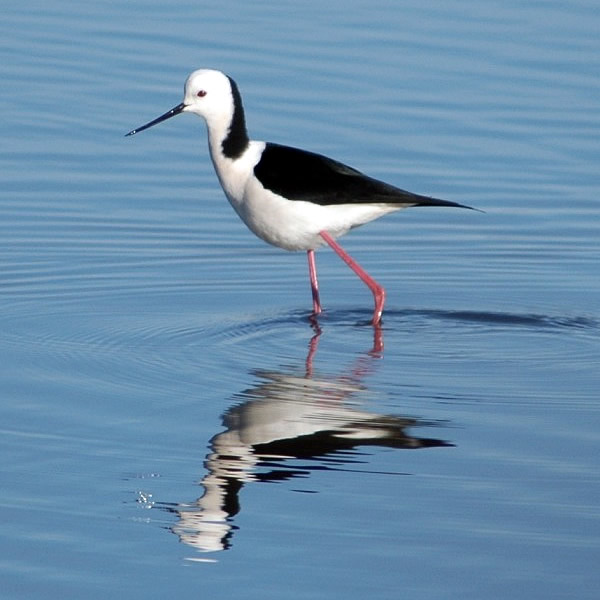
A black-winged stilt

Order: Charadriiformes Family: Haematopodidae

The oystercatchers are large and noisy plover-like birds, with strong bills used for smashing or prising open molluscs.

- Eurasian oystercatcher, Haematopus ostralegus Linnaeus, 1758

== Plovers and lapwings ==
Order: Charadriiformes Family: Charadriidae

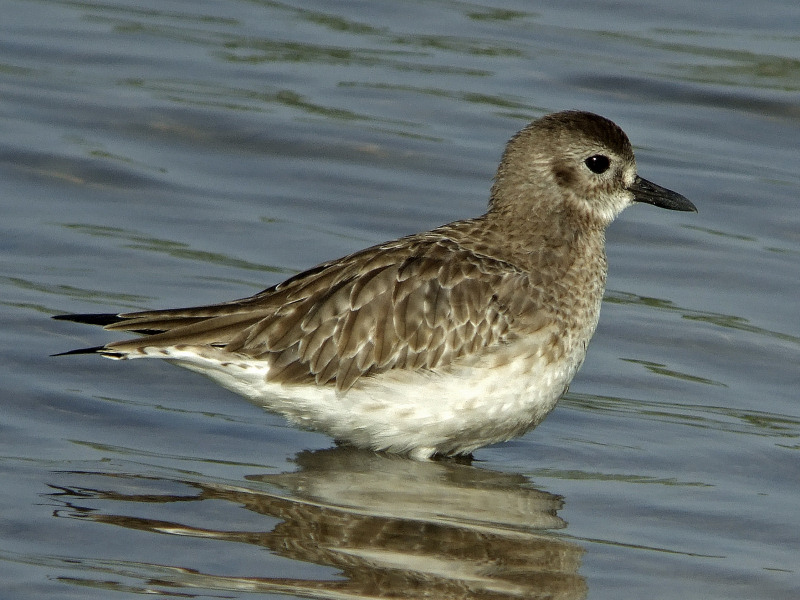
A black-bellied plover

The family Charadriidae includes the plovers, dotterels and lapwings. They are small to medium-sized birds with compact bodies, short, thick necks and long, usually pointed, wings. They are found in open country worldwide, mostly in habitats near water.

- Black-bellied plover, Pluvialis squatarola (Linnaeus, 1758)
- European golden-plover, Pluvialis apricaria (Linnaeus, 1758)
- Pacific golden-plover, Pluvialis fulva (Gmelin, JF, 1789)
- Northern lapwing, Vanellus vanellus (Linnaeus, 1758); Ancient Egyptian: its hieroglyph mostly used to denote rxt "common folk", "subjects"; also once its head follows the word (i)3by.t "dancer" (cfr. Eng.: lapwing = leap-wing)
- Spur-winged plover, Vanellus spinosus (Linnaeus, 1758)
- Sociable lapwing, Vanellus gregarius (Pallas, 1771)
- White-tailed lapwing, Vanellus leucurus (Lichtenstein, MHC, 1823)
- Lesser sand-plover, Charadrius mongolus Pallas, 1776
- Greater sand-plover, Charadrius leschenaultii Lesson, RP, 1826
- Caspian plover, Charadrius asiaticus Pallas, 1773
- Kittlitz's plover, Charadrius pecuarius Temminck, 1823
- Kentish plover, Charadrius alexandrinus Linnaeus, 1758
- Common ringed plover, Charadrius hiaticula Linnaeus, 1758
- Little ringed plover, Charadrius dubius Scopoli, 1786
- Three-banded plover, Charadrius tricollaris Vieillot, 1818
- Eurasian dotterel, Charadrius morinellus Linnaeus, 1758

== Painted-snipes ==
Order: Charadriiformes Family: Rostratulidae

Painted-snipes are short-legged, long-billed birds similar in shape to the true snipes, but more brightly coloured.

- Greater painted-snipe, Rostratula benghalensis (Linnaeus, 1758)

== Sandpipers and allies ==
Order: Charadriiformes Family: Scolopacidae

Scolopacidae is a large diverse family of small to medium-sized shorebirds including the sandpipers, curlews, godwits, shanks, tattlers, woodcocks, snipes, dowitchers and phalaropes. The majority of these species eat small invertebrates picked out of the mud or soil. Variation in length of legs and bills enables multiple species to feed in the same habitat, particularly on the coast, without direct competition for food.

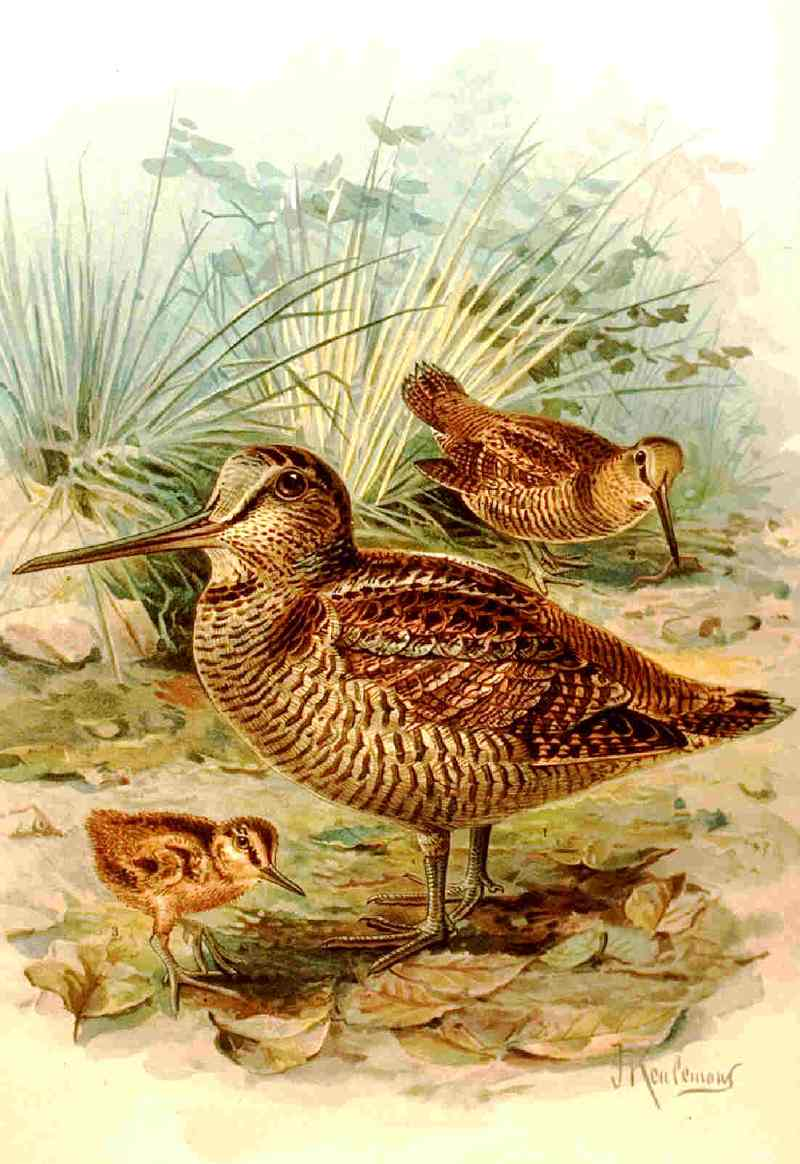
The Eurasian woodcock

- Whimbrel, Numenius phaeopus (Linnaeus, 1758)
- Slender-billed curlew, Numenius tenuirostris Vieillot, 1817
- Eurasian curlew, Numenius arquata (Linnaeus, 1758)
- Bar-tailed godwit, Limosa lapponica (Linnaeus, 1758)
- Black-tailed godwit, Limosa limosa (Linnaeus, 1758)
- Ruddy turnstone, Arenaria interpres (Linnaeus, 1758)
- Red knot, Calidris canutus (Linnaeus, 1758)
- Ruff, Calidris pugnax (Linnaeus, 1758)
- Broad-billed sandpiper, Calidris falcinellus (Pontoppidan, 1763)
- Curlew sandpiper, Calidris ferruginea (Pontoppidan, 1763)
- Temminck's stint, Calidris temminckii (Leisler, 1812)
- Long-toed stint, Calidris subminuta (Middendorff, 1853)
- Sanderling, Calidris alba (Pallas, 1764)
- Dunlin, Calidris alpina (Linnaeus, 1758)
- Little stint, Calidris minuta (Leisler, 1812)
- Pectoral sandpiper, Calidris melanotos (Vieillot, 1819) (A)
- Jack snipe, Lymnocryptes minimus (Brünnich, 1764)
- Eurasian woodcock, Scolopax rusticola Linnaeus, 1758
- Great snipe, Gallinago media (Latham, 1787)
- Common snipe, Gallinago gallinago (Linnaeus, 1758)
- Terek sandpiper, Xenus cinereus (Güldenstädt, 1775)
- Red-necked phalarope, Phalaropus lobatus (Linnaeus, 1758)
- Red phalarope, Phalaropus fulicarius (Linnaeus, 1758)
- Common sandpiper, Actitis hypoleucos (Linnaeus, 1758)
- Green sandpiper, Tringa ochropus Linnaeus, 1758
- Spotted redshank, Tringa erythropus (Pallas, 1764)
- Common greenshank, Tringa nebularia (Gunnerus, 1767)
- Marsh sandpiper, Tringa stagnatilis (Bechstein, 1803)
- Wood sandpiper, Tringa glareola Linnaeus, 1758
- Common redshank, Tringa totanus (Linnaeus, 1758)

== Crab-plover ==
Order: Charadriiformes Family: Dromadidae

The crab-plover is related to the waders. It resembles a plover but with very long grey legs and a strong heavy black bill similar to a tern. It has black-and-white plumage, a long neck, partially webbed feet and a bill designed for eating crabs.

- Crab-plover, Dromas ardeola Paykull, 1805

== Pratincoles and coursers ==
Order: Charadriiformes Family: Glareolidae

Glareolidae is a family of wading birds comprising the pratincoles, which have short legs, long pointed wings and long forked tails, and the coursers, which have long legs, short wings and long, pointed bills which curve downwards.

- Cream-colored courser, Cursorius cursor (Latham, 1787)
- Collared pratincole, Glareola pratincola (Linnaeus, 1766)
- Oriental pratincole, Glareola maldivarum Forster, JR, 1795 (A)
- Black-winged pratincole, Glareola nordmanni Fischer von Waldheim, 1842

== Skuas and jaegers ==
Order: Charadriiformes Family: Stercorariidae

The family Stercorariidae are, in general, medium to large birds, typically with grey or brown plumage, often with white markings on the wings. They nest on the ground in temperate and arctic regions and are long-distance migrants.

- Pomarine jaeger, Stercorarius pomarinus (Temminck, 1815)
- Parasitic jaeger, Stercorarius parasiticus (Linnaeus, 1758)
- Long-tailed jaeger, Stercorarius longicaudus Vieillot, 1819

== Gulls, terns, and skimmers ==
Order: Charadriiformes Family: Laridae

Laridae is a family of medium to large seabirds, the gulls, terns, and skimmers. Gulls are typically grey or white, often with black markings on the head or wings. They have stout, longish bills and webbed feet. Terns are a group of generally medium to large seabirds typically with grey or white plumage, often with black markings on the head. Most terns hunt fish by diving but some pick insects off the surface of fresh water. Terns are generally long-lived birds, with several species known to live in excess of 30 years. Skimmers are a small family of tropical tern-like birds. They have an elongated lower mandible which they use to feed by flying low over the water surface and skimming the water for small fish.

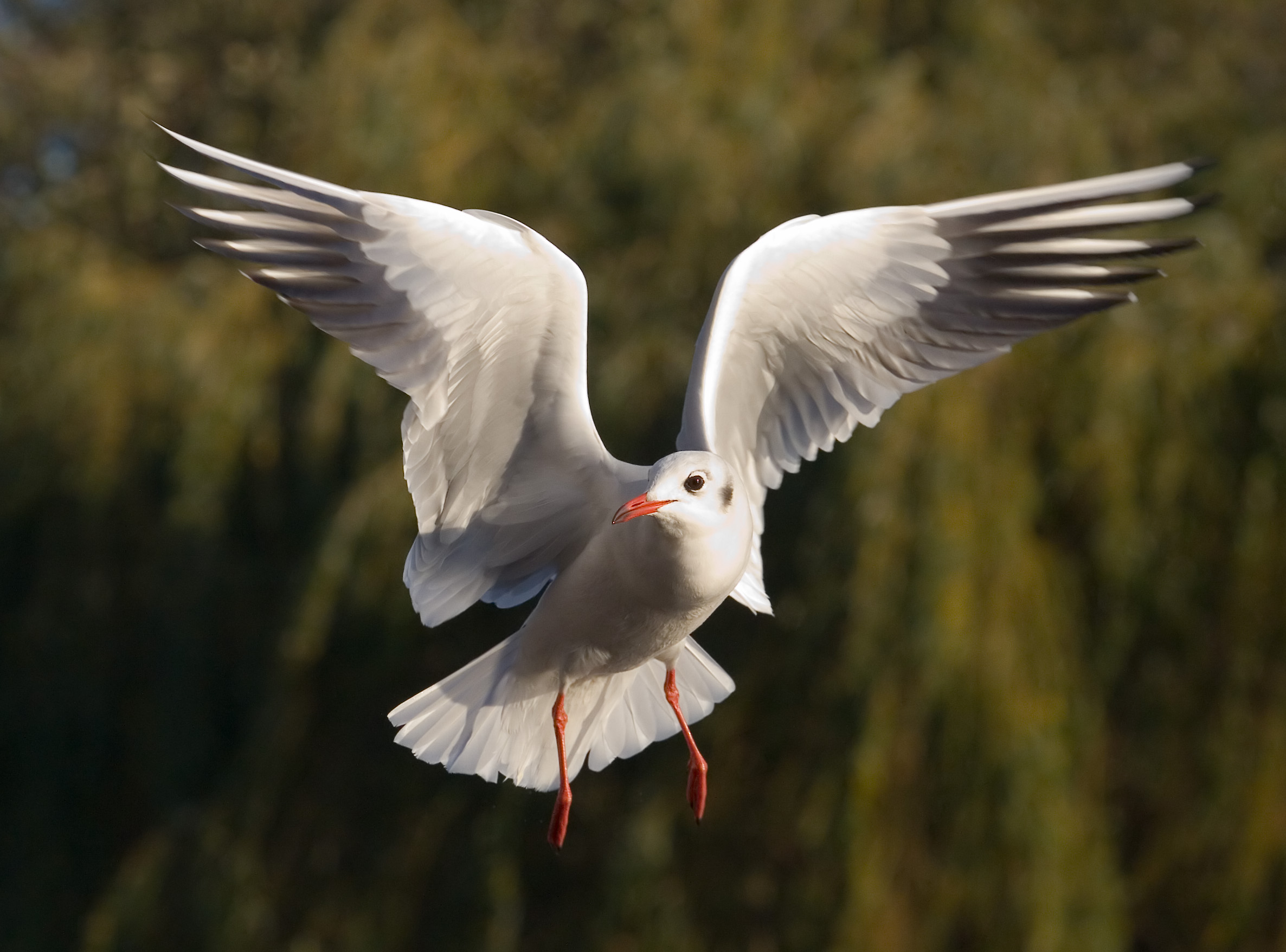
Picture of black-headed gull flying

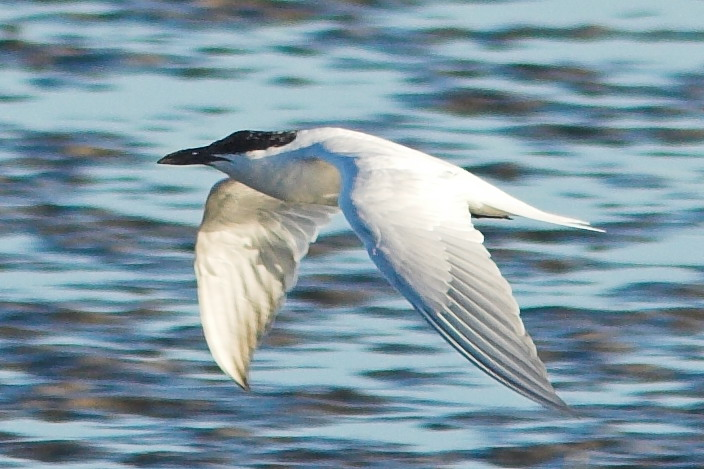
Gull-billed tern flying over a body of water

- Black-legged kittiwake, Rissa tridactyla (Linnaeus, 1758)
- Sabine's gull, Xema sabini (Sabine, 1819) (A)
- Slender-billed gull, Chroicocephalus genei (Brème, 1839)
- Gray-hooded gull, Chroicocephalus cirrocephalus (Vieillot, 1818) (A)
- Black-headed gull, Chroicocephalus ridibundus (Linnaeus, 1766)
- Little gull, Hydrocoloeus minutus (Pallas, 1776)
- Franklin's gull, Leucophaeus pipixcan (Wagler, 1831) (A)
- Mediterranean gull, Ichthyaetus melanocephalus (Temminck, 1820)
- White-eyed gull, Ichthyaetus leucophthalmus (Temminck, 1825)
- Sooty gull, Ichthyaetus hemprichii (Bruch, 1855)
- Pallas's gull, Ichthyaetus ichthyaetus (Pallas, 1773)
- Audouin's gull, Ichthyaetus audouinii (Payraudeau, 1826)
- Common gull, Larus canus Linnaeus, 1758
- Yellow-legged gull, Larus michahellis Naumann, JF, 1840
- Caspian gull, Larus cachinnans Pallas, 1811
- Armenian gull, Larus armenicus Buturlin, 1934
- Lesser black-backed gull, Larus fuscus Linnaeus, 1758
- Bridled tern, Onychoprion anaethetus (Scopoli, 1786)
- Little tern, Sternula albifrons (Pallas, 1764)
- Saunders's tern, Sternula saundersi (Hume, 1877) (A)
- Gull-billed tern, Gelochelidon nilotica (Gmelin, JF, 1789)
- Caspian tern, Hydroprogne caspia (Pallas, 1770)
- Black tern, Chlidonias niger (Linnaeus, 1758)
- White-winged tern, Chlidonias leucopterus (Temminck, 1815)
- Whiskered tern, Chlidonias hybrida (Pallas, 1811)
- Common tern, Sterna hirundo Linnaeus, 1758
- White-cheeked tern, Sterna repressa Hartert, EJO, 1916
- Great crested tern, Thalasseus bergii (Lichtenstein, MHC, 1823)
- Sandwich tern, Thalasseus sandvicensis (Latham, 1787)
- Lesser crested tern, Thalasseus bengalensis (Lesson, RP, 1831)
- African skimmer, Rynchops flavirostris Vieillot, 1816 (A)

== Tropicbirds ==
Order: Phaethontiformes Family: Phaethontidae

Tropicbirds are slender white birds of tropical oceans, with exceptionally long central tail feathers. Their heads and long wings have black markings.

- Red-billed tropicbird, Phaethon aethereus Linnaeus, 1758

== Albatrosses ==
Order: Procellariiformes Family: Diomedeidae

The albatrosses are among the largest of flying birds, and the great albatrosses from the genus Diomedea have the largest wingspans of any extant birds.

- White-capped albatross, Thalassarche cauta (Gould, 1841) (A)

== Southern storm-petrels ==
Order: Procellariiformes Family: Oceanitidae

The southern storm-petrels are relatives of the petrels and are the smallest seabirds. They feed on planktonic crustaceans and small fish picked from the surface, typically while hovering. The flight is fluttering and sometimes bat-like.

- Wilson's storm-petrel, Oceanites oceanicus (Kuhl, 1820)

== Northern storm-petrels ==
Order: Procellariiformes Family: Hydrobatidae

Though the members of this family are similar in many respects to the southern storm-petrels, including their general appearance and habits, there are enough genetic differences to warrant their placement in a separate family.

- Leach's storm-petrel, Hydrobates leucorhous (Vieillot, 1818) (A)

== Shearwaters and petrels ==
Order: Procellariiformes Family: Procellariidae

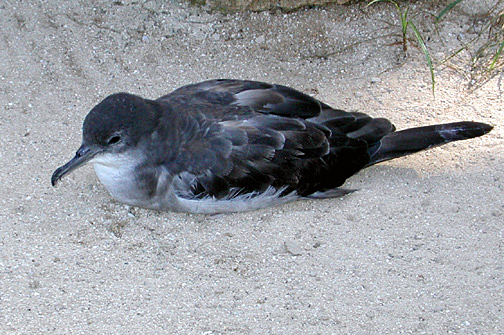
Wedge-tailed shearwater

The procellariids are the main group of medium-sized "true petrels", characterised by united nostrils with medium septum and a long outer functional primary.

- Streaked shearwater, Calonectris leucomelas (A)
- Cory's shearwater, Calonectris diomedea (Scopoli, 1769)
- Wedge-tailed shearwater, Ardenna pacifica (Gmelin, JF, 1789) (A)
- Sooty shearwater, Ardenna grisea (Gmelin, JF, 1789)
- Yelkouan shearwater, Puffinus yelkouan (Acerbi, 1827)
- Balearic shearwater, Puffinus mauretanicus Lowe, 1921 (A)
- Persian shearwater, Puffinus persicus Hume, 1872 (A)

== Storks ==
Order: Ciconiiformes Family: Ciconiidae

Storks are large, long-legged, long-necked, wading birds with long, stout bills. Storks are mute, but bill-clattering is an important mode of communication at the nest. Their nests can be large and may be reused for many years. Many species are migratory.

- African openbill, Anastomus lamelligerus Temminck, 1823 (A)
- Black stork, Ciconia nigra (Linnaeus, 1758)
- White stork, Ciconia ciconia (Linnaeus, 1758)
- Marabou stork, Leptoptilos crumenifer (Lesson, RP, 1831) (A)
- Yellow-billed stork, Mycteria ibis (Linnaeus, 1766)

== Boobies and gannets ==
Order: Suliformes Family: Sulidae

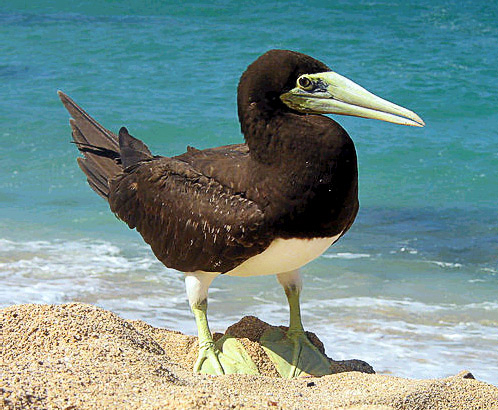
Brown booby

The sulids comprise the gannets and boobies. Both groups are medium to large coastal seabirds that plunge-dive for fish.

- Masked booby, Sula dactylatra Lesson, RP, 1831 (A)
- Brown booby, Sula leucogaster (Boddaert, 1783)
- Northern gannet, Morus bassanus (Linnaeus, 1758)

== Anhingas ==
Order: Suliformes Family: Anhingidae

Anhingas or darters are often called "snake-birds" because of their long thin neck, which gives a snake-like appearance when they swim with their bodies submerged. The males have black and dark-brown plumage, an erectile crest on the nape and a larger bill than the female. The females have much paler plumage especially on the neck and underparts. The darters have completely webbed feet and their legs are short and set far back on the body. Their plumage is somewhat permeable, like that of cormorants, and they spread their wings to dry after diving.

- African darter, Anhinga rufa (Daudin, 1802) (A)

== Cormorants and shags ==
Order: Suliformes Family: Phalacrocoracidae

Phalacrocoracidae is a family of medium to large coastal, fish-eating seabirds that includes cormorants and shags. Plumage colouration varies, with the majority having mainly dark plumage, some species being black-and-white and a few being colourful.

- Long-tailed cormorant, Microcarbo africanus (Gmelin, JF, 1789) (A)
- Pygmy cormorant, Microcarbo pygmaeus (Pallas, 1773) (A)
- Great cormorant, Phalacrocorax carbo (Linnaeus, 1758)
- European shag, Gulosus aristotelis (Linnaeus, 1761) (A)

== Pelicans ==
Order: Pelecaniformes Family: Pelecanidae

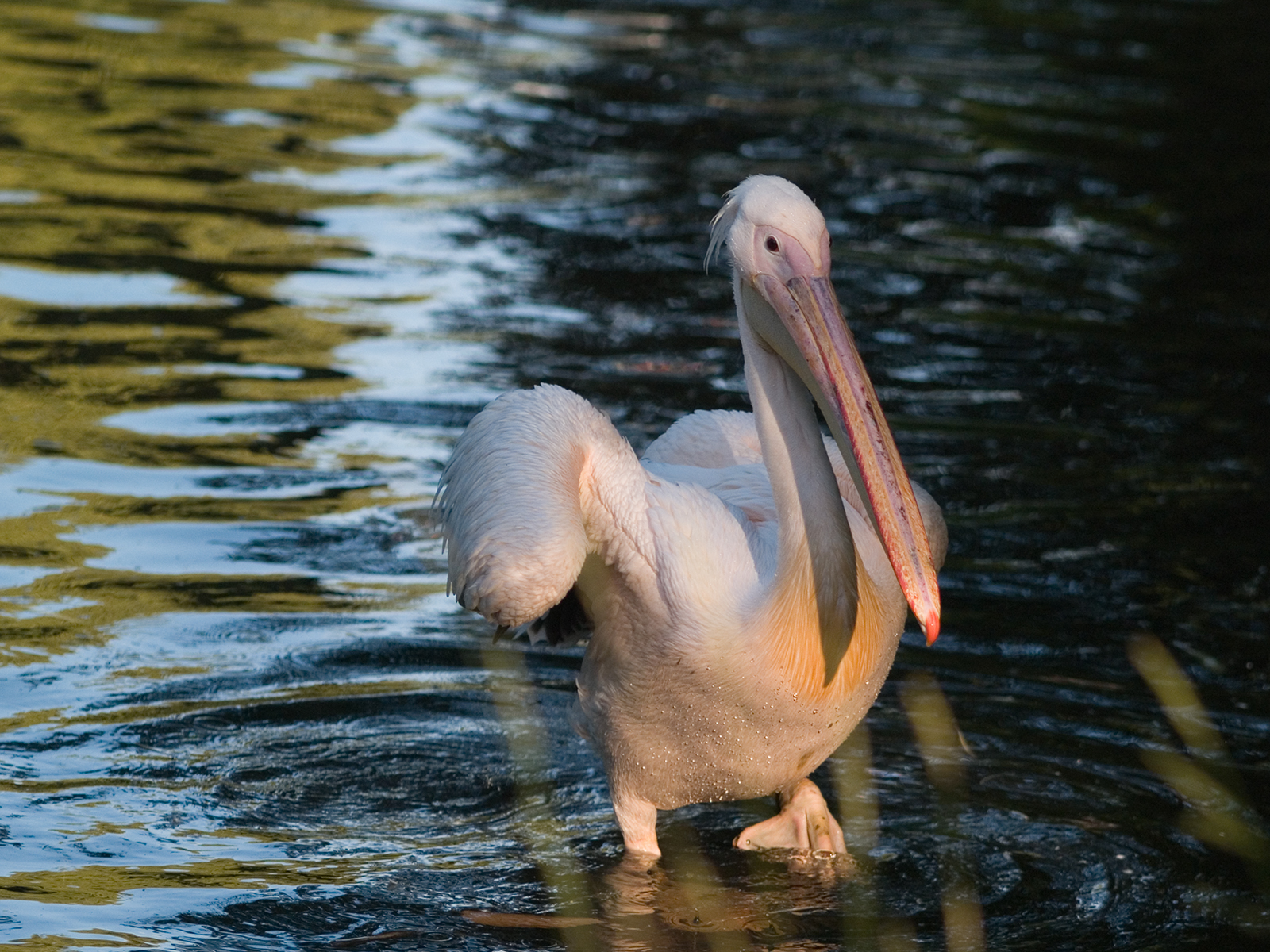
A great white pelican emerging from a body of water

Pelicans are large water birds with a distinctive pouch under their beak. As with other members of the order Pelecaniformes, they have webbed feet with four toes.

- Great white pelican, Pelecanus onocrotalus Linnaeus, 1758
- Pink-backed pelican, Pelecanus rufescens Gmelin, JF, 1789
- Dalmatian pelican, Pelecanus crispus Bruch, 1832

== Herons, egrets, and bitterns ==
Order: Pelecaniformes Family: Ardeidae

The family Ardeidae contains the bitterns, herons and egrets. Herons and egrets are medium to large wading birds with long necks and legs. Bitterns tend to be shorter necked and more wary. Members of Ardeidae fly with their necks retracted, unlike other long-necked birds such as storks, ibises and spoonbills.

- Great bittern, Botaurus stellaris (Linnaeus, 1758)
- Yellow bittern, Ixobrychus sinensis (Gmelin, JF, 1789) (A)
- Little bittern, Ixobrychus minutus (Linnaeus, 1766)
- Schrenck's bittern, Ixobrychus eurhythmus (Swinhoe, 1873) (A)
- Gray heron, Ardea cinerea Linnaeus, 1758
- Great blue heron, Ardea herodias Linnaeus, 1758 (A)
- Black-headed heron, Ardea melanocephala Children & Vigors, 1826 (A)
- Goliath heron, Ardea goliath Cretzschmar, 1829
- Purple heron, Ardea purpurea Linnaeus, 1766
- Great egret, Ardea alba Linnaeus, 1758
- Little egret, Egretta garzetta (Linnaeus, 1766)
- Western reef-heron, Egretta gularis (Bosc, 1792)
- Cattle egret, Bubulcus ibis (Linnaeus, 1758)
- Squacco heron, Ardeola ralloides (Scopoli, 1769)
- Striated heron, Butorides striata (Linnaeus, 1758)
- Black-crowned night-heron, Nycticorax nycticorax (Linnaeus, 1758)

== Ibises and spoonbills ==
Order: Pelecaniformes Family: Threskiornithidae

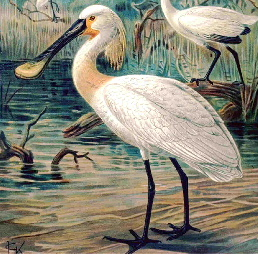
The Eurasian or common spoonbill

Threskiornithidae is a family of large terrestrial and wading birds which includes the ibises and spoonbills. They have long, broad wings with 11 primary and about 20 secondary feathers. They are strong fliers and despite their size and weight, very capable soarers.

- Glossy ibis, Plegadis falcinellus (Linnaeus, 1766)
- Northern bald ibis, Geronticus eremita (Linnaeus, 1758) (A)
- African sacred ibis, Threskiornis aethiopicus (Latham, 1790) (Ex)
- Eurasian spoonbill, Platalea leucorodia Linnaeus, 1758

== Secretarybird ==
Order: Accipitriformes Family: Sagittariidae

The secretarybird is a bird of prey in the order Accipitriformes but is easily distinguished from other raptors by its long crane-like legs.

- Secretarybird, Sagittarius serpentarius (Miller, JF, 1779) (Ex)

== Osprey ==
Order: Accipitriformes Family: Pandionidae

The family Pandionidae contains only one species, the osprey. The osprey is a medium-large raptor which is a specialist fish-eater with a worldwide distribution.

- Osprey, Pandion haliaetus (Linnaeus, 1758)

== Hawks, eagles, and kites ==
Order: Accipitriformes Family: Accipitridae

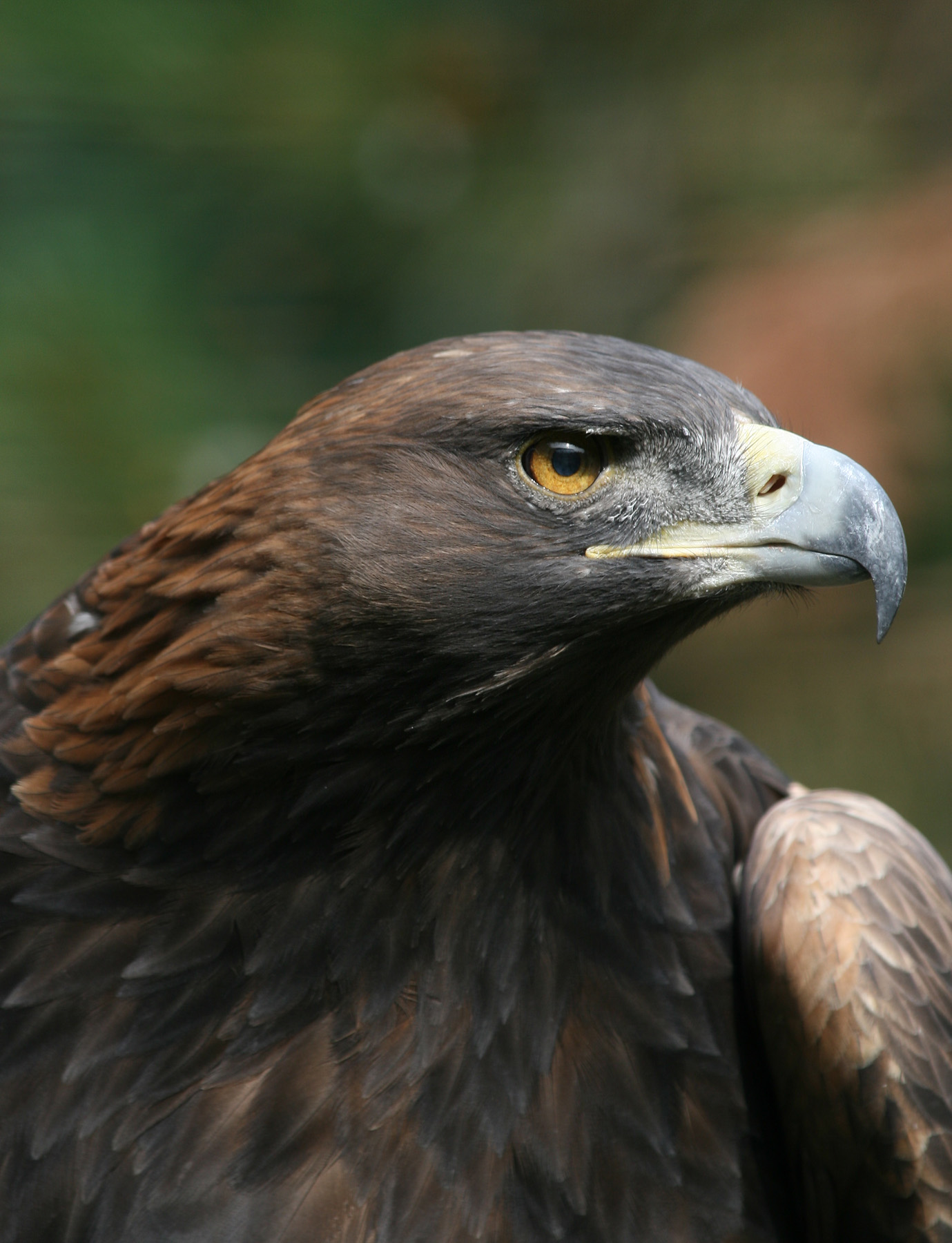
A golden eagle

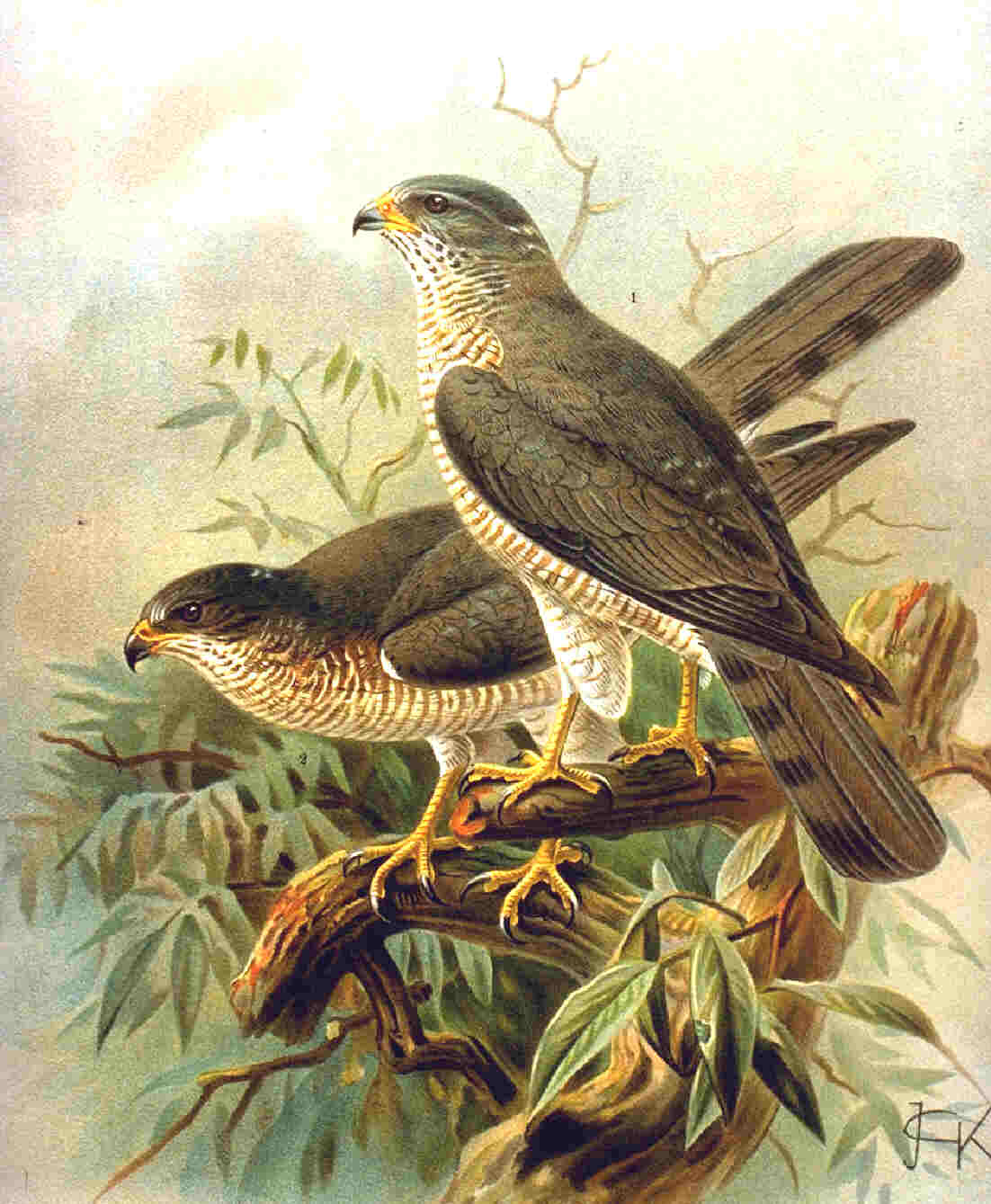
A Levant sparrowhawk

Accipitridae is a family of birds of prey, which includes hawks, eagles, kites, harriers and Old World vultures. These birds have powerful hooked beaks for tearing flesh from their prey, strong legs, powerful talons and keen eyesight.

- Black-winged kite, Elanus caeruleus (Desfontaines, 1789)
- Bearded vulture, Gypaetus barbatus (Linnaeus, 1758)
- Egyptian vulture, Neophron percnopterus (Linnaeus, 1758); Ancient Egyptian: 3 (the hieroglyph) "one who treads" ?
- European honey-buzzard, Pernis apivorus (Linnaeus, 1758) (A)
- Oriental honey-buzzard, Pernis ptilorhynchus (Temminck, 1821) (A)
- Cinereous vulture, Aegypius monachus (Linnaeus, 1766)
- Lappet-faced vulture, Torgos tracheliotos (Forster, JR, 1796)
- White-backed vulture, Gyps africanus Salvadori, 1865 (A)
- Rüppell's vulture, Gyps rueppelli (Brehm, AE, 1852)
- Eurasian griffon, Gyps fulvus (Hablizl, 1783); Ancient Egyptian: nr(w) "terrifying one" (A)
- Bateleur, Terathopius ecaudatus (Daudin, 1800)
- Short-toed snake-eagle, Circaetus gallicus (Gmelin, JF, 1788)
- Lesser spotted eagle, Clanga pomarina (Brehm, CL, 1831)
- Greater spotted eagle, Clanga clanga (Pallas, 1811)
- Wahlberg's eagle, Hieraaetus wahlbergi (Sundevall, 1850) (A)
- Booted eagle, Hieraaetus pennatus (Gmelin, JF, 1788)
- Tawny eagle, Aquila rapax (Temminck, 1828) (A)
- Steppe eagle, Aquila nipalensis Hodgson, 1833
- Imperial eagle, Aquila heliaca Savigny, 1809
- Golden eagle, Aquila chrysaetos (Linnaeus, 1758)
- Verreaux's eagle, Aquila verreauxii Lesson, RP, 1831
- Bonelli's eagle, Aquila fasciata Vieillot, 1822
- Gabar goshawk, Micronisus gabar (Daudin, 1800) (A)
- Eurasian marsh-harrier, Circus aeruginosus (Linnaeus, 1758)
- Hen harrier, Circus cyaneus (Linnaeus, 1766)
- Pallid harrier, Circus macrourus (Gmelin, SG, 1770)
- Montagu's harrier, Circus pygargus (Linnaeus, 1758)
- Levant sparrowhawk, Accipiter brevipes (Severtsov, 1850)
- Eurasian sparrowhawk, Accipiter nisus (Linnaeus, 1758)
- Northern goshawk, Accipiter gentilis (Linnaeus, 1758)
- Red kite, Milvus milvus (Linnaeus, 1758)
- Black kite, Milvus migrans (Boddaert, 1783); Ancient Egyptian: Dr/Dr.t (possibly) "one who grasps/holds"
- White-tailed eagle, Haliaeetus albicilla (Linnaeus, 1758)
- African fish-eagle, Icthyophaga vocifer (Daudin, 1800) (A)
- Common buzzard, Buteo buteo (Linnaeus, 1758); Ancient Egyptian: tyw "shrieker" (like ti3w) or "treader" (like tiw(?)
- Long-legged buzzard, Buteo rufinus (Cretzschmar, 1829)

== Barn-owls ==
Order: Strigiformes Family: Tytonidae

Barn owls are medium to large owls with large heads and characteristic heart-shaped faces. They have long strong legs with powerful talons.

- Barn owl, Tyto alba (Scopoli, 1769); its hieroglyph stands for the consonant -m- probably derived from the owl's name (i)m(w) "one who moans" or "laments"

== Owls ==
Order: Strigiformes Family: Strigidae

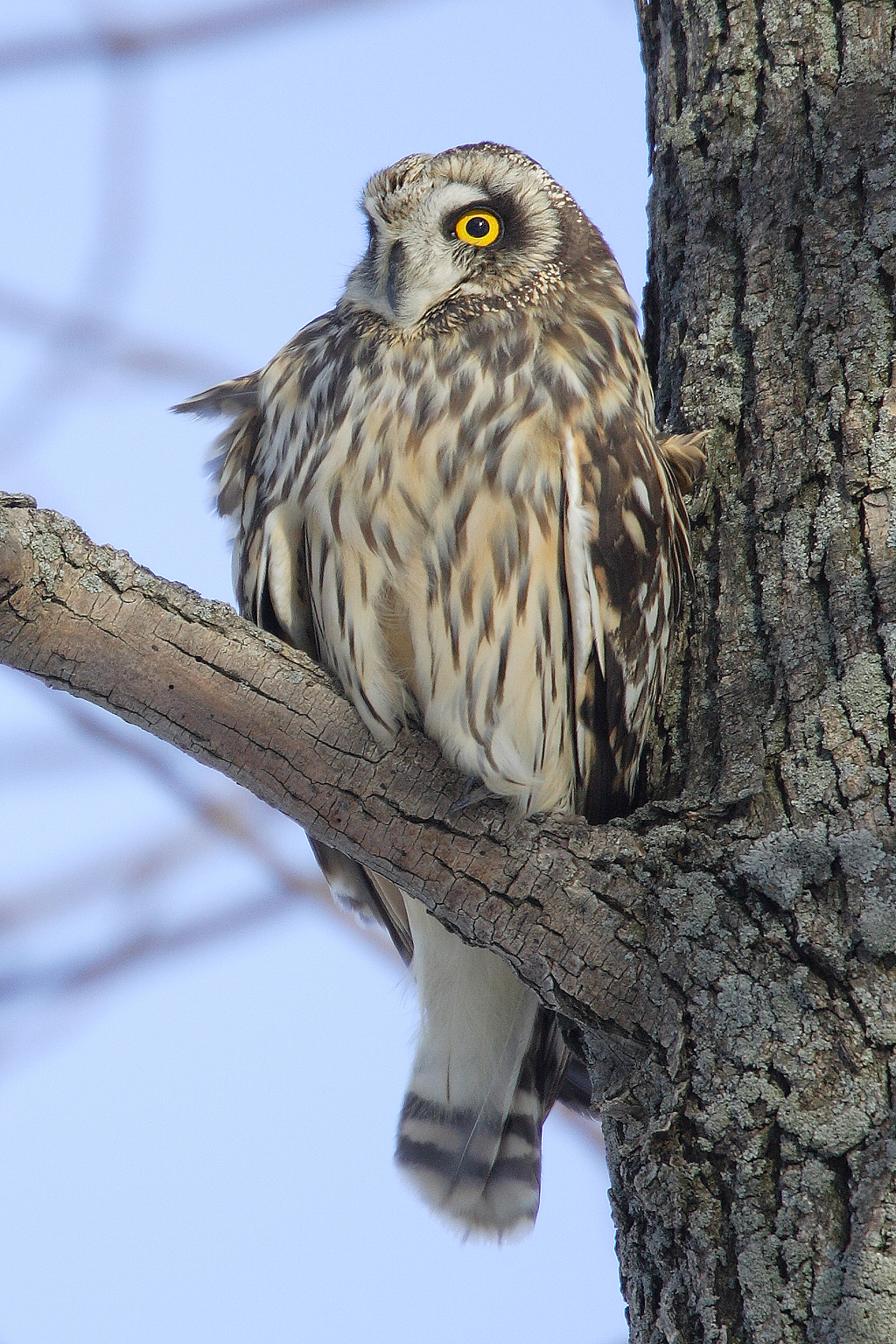
A short-eared owl in a tree

The typical owls are small to large solitary nocturnal birds of prey. They have large forward-facing eyes and ears, a hawk-like beak and a conspicuous circle of feathers around each eye called a facial disk.

- Eurasian scops-owl, Otus scops (Linnaeus, 1758)
- Pallid scops-owl, Otus brucei (Hume, 1872) (A)
- Pharaoh eagle-owl, Bubo ascalaphus Savigny, 1809
- Little owl, Athene noctua (Scopoli, 1769)
- Desert owl, Strix hadorami Kirwan, Schweizer & Copete, 2015
- Omani owl, Strix butleri (Hume, 1878)
- Long-eared owl, Asio otus (Linnaeus, 1758)
- Short-eared owl, Asio flammeus (Pontoppidan, 1763)

== Hoopoes ==
Order: Bucerotiformes Family: Upupidae

Hoopoes have black, white and orangey-pink colouring with a large erectile crest on their head.

- Eurasian hoopoe, Upupa epops Linnaeus, 1758; Ancient Egyptian: hieroglyph of the bird almost always used as or in the word db "sundried brick" (literal meaning: "one that blocks up"); therefore one of the ancient names must have been Db(3)w/Db(3).t "the one who blocks up (its nest hole)"; a later name would be q(w)q(w)p.t > Coptic koukoupat/krapep e.a. comparable to biblical dukhiphat (literal meaning unknown)

== Kingfishers ==
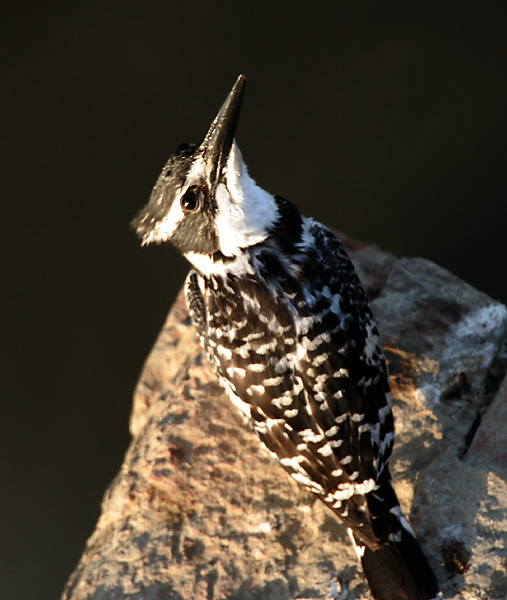
A pied kingfisher, seen from above

Order: Coraciiformes Family: Alcedinidae

Kingfishers are medium-sized birds with large heads, long, pointed bills, short legs and stubby tails.

- Common kingfisher, Alcedo atthis (Linnaeus, 1758); Ancient Egyptian: Hnty "the one of the canal"
- White-throated kingfisher, Halcyon smyrnensis (Linnaeus, 1758)
- Collared kingfisher, Todiramphus chloris (Boddaert, 1783)
- Pied kingfisher, Ceryle rudis (Linnaeus, 1758); Ancient Egyptian: cnHb.t < cn-nHb.t "the one turning around the neck (when hovering above water spying fish)"

== Bee-eaters ==
Order: Coraciiformes Family: Meropidae

Two European bee eaters, one with a bee in its mouth

The bee-eaters are a group of near passerine birds in the family Meropidae. Most species are found in Africa but others occur in southern Europe, Madagascar, Australia and New Guinea. They are characterised by richly coloured plumage, slender bodies and usually elongated central tail feathers. All are colourful and have long downturned bills and pointed wings, which give them a swallow-like appearance when seen from afar.

- African green bee-eater, Merops viridissimus Swainson, 1837; Ancient Egyptian: w3D3D "totally green one"
- Blue-cheeked bee-eater, Merops persicus Pallas, 1773
- European bee-eater, Merops apiaster Linnaeus, 1758

== Rollers ==
Order: Coraciiformes Family: Coraciidae

Rollers resemble crows in size and build, but are more closely related to the kingfishers and bee-eaters. They share the colourful appearance of those groups with blues and browns predominating. The two inner front toes are connected, but the outer toe is not.

- European roller, Coracias garrulus Linnaeus, 1758; Ancient Egyptian swrrw (meaning unknown)
- Abyssinian roller, Coracias abyssinicus Hermann, 1783 (A)
- Cinnamon roller, Eurystomus glaucurus (Müller, PLS, 1776) (A)

== Woodpeckers ==
Order: Piciformes Family: Picidae

Woodpeckers are small to medium-sized birds with chisel-like beaks, short legs, stiff tails and long tongues used for capturing insects. Some species have feet with two toes pointing forward and two backward, while several species have only three toes. Many woodpeckers have the habit of tapping noisily on tree trunks with their beaks.

- Eurasian wryneck, Jynx torquilla Linnaeus, 1758
- Syrian woodpecker, Dendrocopos syriacus (Hemprich & Ehrenberg, 1833)

== Falcons and caracaras ==
Order: Falconiformes Family: Falconidae

Falconidae is a family of diurnal birds of prey. They differ from hawks, eagles and kites in that they kill with their beaks instead of their talons. In Ancient Egyptian only one species is depicted as breeding in the delta and called HrT (meaning unknown).

- Lesser kestrel, Falco naumanni Fleischer, JG, 1818
- Eurasian kestrel, Falco tinnunculus Linnaeus, 1758
- Red-footed falcon, Falco vespertinus Linnaeus, 1766
- Eleonora's falcon, Falco eleonorae Géné, 1839
- Sooty falcon, Falco concolor Temminck, 1825
- Merlin, Falco columbarius Linnaeus, 1758
- Eurasian hobby, Falco subbuteo Linnaeus, 1758
- Lanner falcon, Falco biarmicus Temminck, 1825
- Saker falcon, Falco cherrug Gray, JE, 1834 (A)
- Peregrine falcon, Falco peregrinus Tunstall, 1771; Ancient Egyptian: its hieroglyphic sign stands for the deity Horus the one far up/high
  - Barbary falcon, Falco peregrinus pelegrinoides

== Old World parrots ==
Order: Psittaciformes Family: Psittaculidae

Characteristic features of parrots include a strong curved bill, an upright stance, strong legs, and clawed zygodactyl feet. Many parrots are vividly coloured, and some are multi-coloured. In size they range from 8 cm (3.1 in) to 1 m (3.3 ft) in length. Old World parrots are found from Africa east across south and southeast Asia and Oceania to Australia and New Zealand.

- Alexandrine parakeet, Psittacula eupatria (Linnaeus, 1766) (A)
- Rose-ringed parakeet, Psittacula krameri (Scopoli, 1769) (I)

== Old World orioles ==
Order: Passeriformes Family: Oriolidae

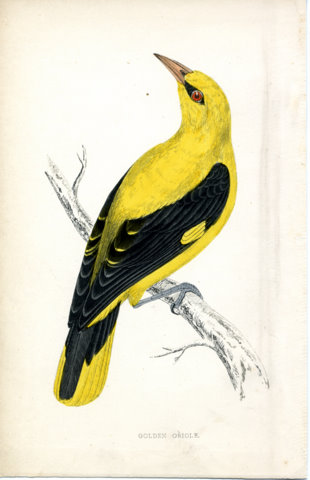
An engraving of a golden oriole

The Old World orioles are colourful passerine birds. They are not related to the New World orioles.

- Eurasian golden oriole, Oriolus oriolus (Linnaeus, 1758); Ancient Egyptian: gnw "the one (with) carved (eye line)"

== Bushshrikes and allies ==
Order: Passeriformes Family: Malaconotidae

Bushshrikes are similar in habits to shrikes, hunting insects and other small prey from a perch on a bush. Although similar in build to the shrikes, these tend to be either colourful species or largely black; some species are quite secretive.

- Rosy-patched bushshrike, Rhodophoneus cruentus

== Shrikes ==
Order: Passeriformes Family: Laniidae

Shrikes are passerine birds known for their habit of catching other birds and small animals and impaling the uneaten portions of their bodies on thorns. A typical shrike's beak is hooked, like a bird of prey.

- Red-backed shrike, Lanius collurio Linnaeus, 1758
- Red-tailed shrike, Lanius phoenicuroides (Schalow, 1875)
- Isabelline shrike, Lanius isabellinus Hemprich & Ehrenberg, 1833 (A)
- Great gray shrike, Lanius excubitor Linnaeus, 1758
- Lesser gray shrike, Lanius minor Gmelin, JF, 1788
- Masked shrike, Lanius nubicus Lichtenstein, MHC, 1823
- Woodchat shrike, Lanius senator Linnaeus, 1758

== Crows, jays, and magpies ==
Order: Passeriformes Family: Corvidae

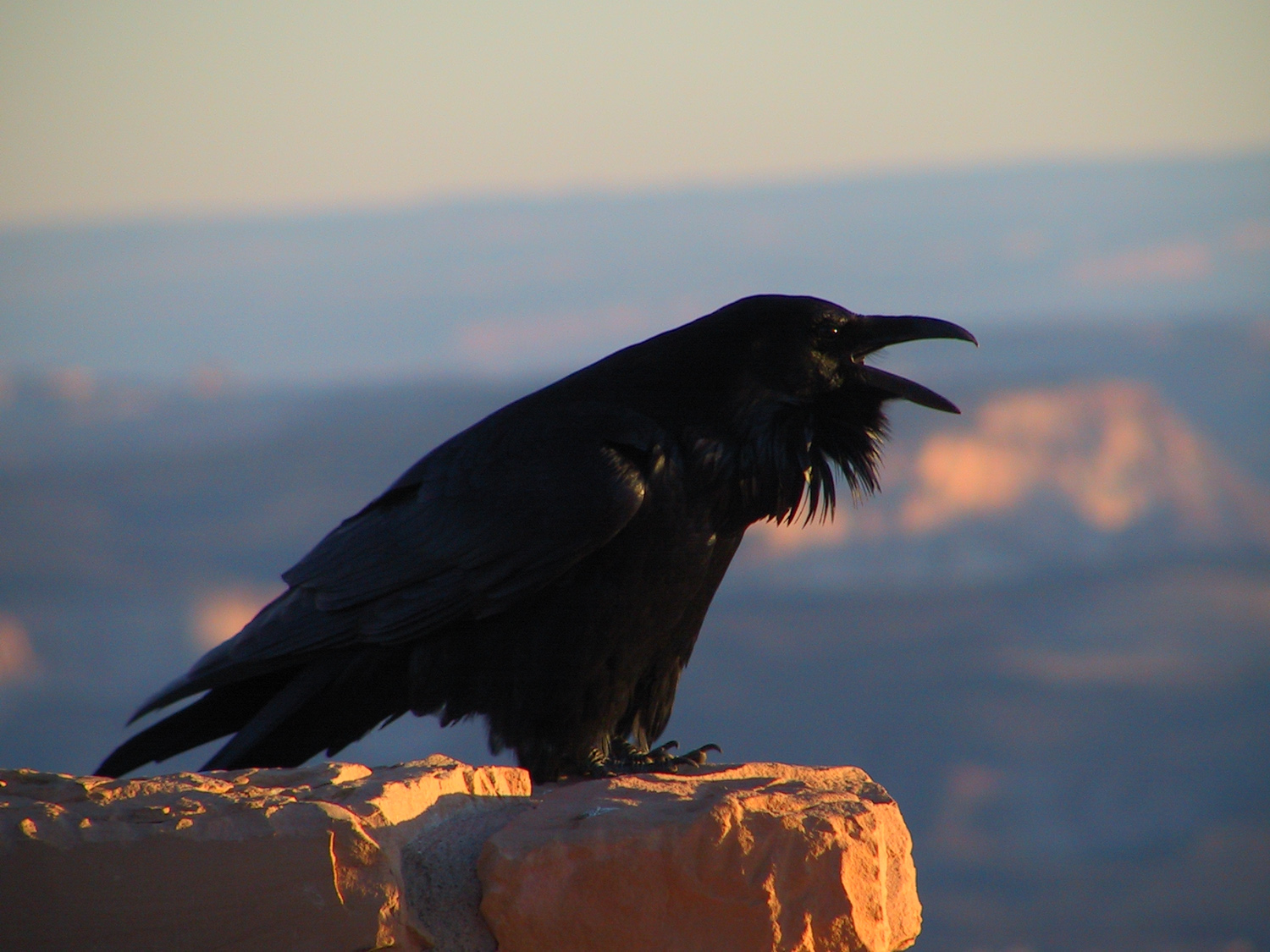
A common raven

The family Corvidae includes crows, ravens, jays, choughs, magpies, treepies, nutcrackers and ground jays. Corvids are above average in size among the Passeriformes, and some of the larger species show high levels of intelligence.

Ancient Egyptian names for crow or raven species include very possibly gbgb/gbg3; this bird is once called 3pd km or black bird, while its eggs could apparently be gathered according to a medical papyrus, and therefore points to a breeding bird of Egypt. In demotic an ʾbḳ-bird can be determined by help of the existence of Coptic abook "crow, raven". But perhaps the latter is also a derivation of the bird name kbk.

Late Egyptian, male personal names include a Gebgeb, possible "the crow", perhaps because the baby had black hair or a dark complexion. (drs. Carles Wolterman, Amstelveen, Holland)

- House crow, Corvus splendens Vieillot, 1817 (I)
- Rook, Corvus frugilegus Linnaeus, 1758
- Carrion crow, Corvus corone Linnaeus, 1758
- Eurasian magpie, Pica pica Linnaeus, 1758 (A)
- Hooded crow, Corvus cornix Linnaeus, 1758
- Pied crow, Corvus albus Müller, PLS, 1776 (A)
- Brown-necked raven, Corvus ruficollis Lesson, RP, 1831
- Fan-tailed raven, Corvus rhipidurus Hartert, EJO, 1918
- Common raven, Corvus corax Linnaeus, 1758

== Tits, chickadees, and titmice ==
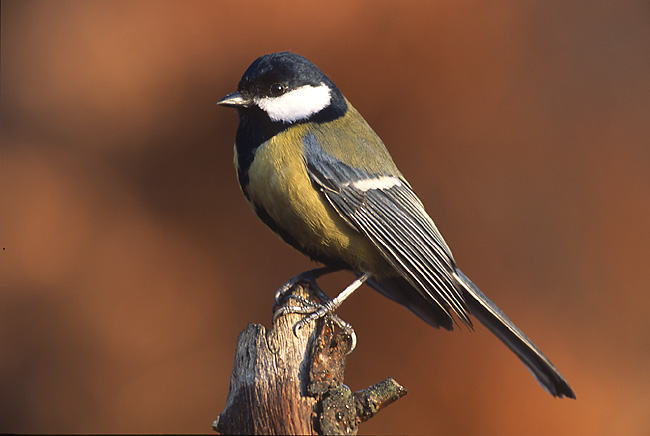
A great tit.

Order: Passeriformes Family: Paridae

The Paridae are mainly small stocky woodland species with short stout bills. Some have crests. They are adaptable birds, with a mixed diet including seeds and insects.

- Great tit, Parus major Linnaeus, 1758

== Penduline-tits ==
Order: Passeriformes Family: Remizidae

The penduline-tits are a group of small passerine birds related to the true tits. They are insectivores.

- Eurasian penduline-tit, Remiz pendulinus (Linnaeus, 1758)

== Larks ==
Order: Passeriformes Family: Alaudidae

Larks are small terrestrial birds with often extravagant songs and display flights. Most larks are fairly dull in appearance. Their food is insects and seeds.

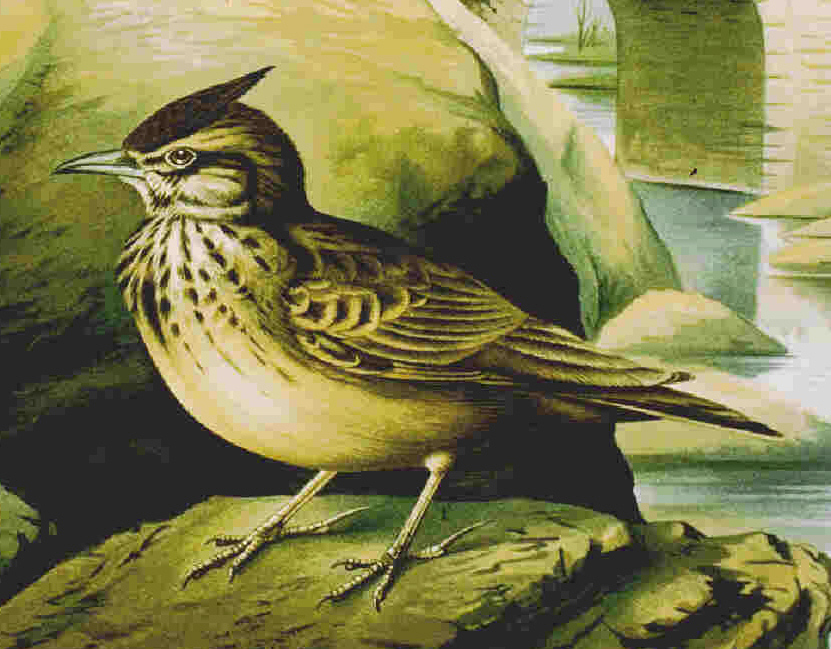
A depiction of a Thekla lark

- Greater hoopoe-lark, Alaemon alaudipes (Desfontaines, 1789)
- Thick-billed lark, Ramphocoris clotbey (Bonaparte, 1850) (A)
- Bar-tailed lark, Ammomanes cinctura (Gould, 1839)
- Desert lark, Ammomanes deserti (Lichtenstein, MHC, 1823)
- Black-crowned sparrow-lark, Eremopterix nigriceps (Gould, 1839)
- Temminck's lark, Eremophila bilopha (Temminck, 1823)
- Greater short-toed lark, Calandrella brachydactyla (Leisler, 1814)
- Bimaculated lark, Melanocorypha bimaculata (Ménétriés, 1832)
- Calandra lark, Melanocorypha calandra (Linnaeus, 1766)
- Dupont's lark, Chersophilus duponti (Vieillot, 1824)
- Mediterranean short-toed lark, Alaudala rufescens (Vieillot, 1819)
- Turkestan short-toed lark, Alaudala heinei (Homeyer, 1873)
- Wood lark, Lullula arborea (Linnaeus, 1758)
- Eurasian skylark, Alauda arvensis Linnaeus, 1758
- Oriental skylark, Alauda gulgula Franklin, 1831
- Thekla's lark, Galerida theklae Brehm, AE, 1857 (A)
- Crested lark, Galerida cristata (Linnaeus, 1758)

== Bearded reedling ==
Order: Passeriformes Family: Panuridae

This species, the only one in its family, is found in reed beds throughout temperate Europe and Asia.

- Bearded reedling, Panurus biarmicus (Linnaeus, 1758) (A)

== Cisticolas and allies ==
Order: Passeriformes Family: Cisticolidae

The Cisticolidae are warblers found mainly in warmer southern regions of the Old World. They are generally very small birds of drab brown or grey appearance found in open country such as grassland or scrub.

- Graceful prinia, Prinia gracilis (Lichtenstein, MHC, 1823)
- Zitting cisticola, Cisticola juncidis (Rafinesque, 1810)

== Reed warblers and allies ==
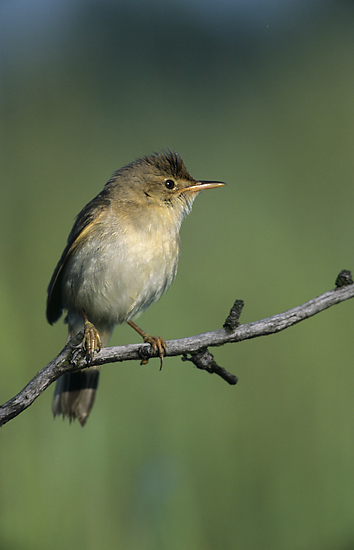
A marsh warbler

Order: Passeriformes Family: Acrocephalidae

The members of this family are usually rather large for "warblers". Most are rather plain olivaceous brown above with much yellow to beige below. They are usually found in open woodland, reedbeds, or tall grass. The family occurs mostly in southern to western Eurasia and surroundings, but it also ranges far into the Pacific, with some species in Africa.

- Thick-billed warbler, Arundinax aedon (Pallas, 1776) (A)
- Booted warbler, Iduna caligata (Lichtenstein, MHC, 1823)
- Eastern olivaceous warbler, Iduna pallida (Hemprich & Ehrenberg, 1833)
- Western olivaceous warbler, Iduna opaca (Cabanis, 1851) (A)
- Upcher's warbler, Hippolais languida (Hemprich & Ehrenberg, 1833)
- Olive-tree warbler, Hippolais olivetorum (Strickland, 1837)
- Icterine warbler, Hippolais icterina (Vieillot, 1817)
- Aquatic warbler, Acrocephalus paludicola (Vieillot, 1817) (A)
- Moustached warbler, Acrocephalus melanopogon (Temminck, 1823)
- Sedge warbler, Acrocephalus schoenobaenus (Linnaeus, 1758)
- Blyth's reed warbler, Acrocephalus dumetorum Blyth, 1849
- Marsh warbler, Acrocephalus palustris (Bechstein, 1798)
- Eurasian reed warbler, Acrocephalus scirpaceus (Hermann, 1804)
- Great reed warbler, Acrocephalus arundinaceus (Linnaeus, 1758)
- Clamorous reed warbler, Acrocephalus stentoreus (Hemprich & Ehrenberg, 1833)

== Grassbirds and allies ==
Order: Passeriformes Family: Locustellidae

Locustellidae are a family of small insectivorous songbirds found mainly in Eurasia, Africa, and the Australian region. They are smallish birds with tails that are usually long and pointed, and tend to be drab brownish or buffy all over.

- River warbler, Locustella fluviatilis (Wolf, 1810)
- Savi's warbler, Locustella luscinioides (Savi, 1824)
- Common grasshopper-warbler, Locustella naevia (Boddaert, 1783) (A)

== Swallows ==
Order: Passeriformes Family: Hirundinidae

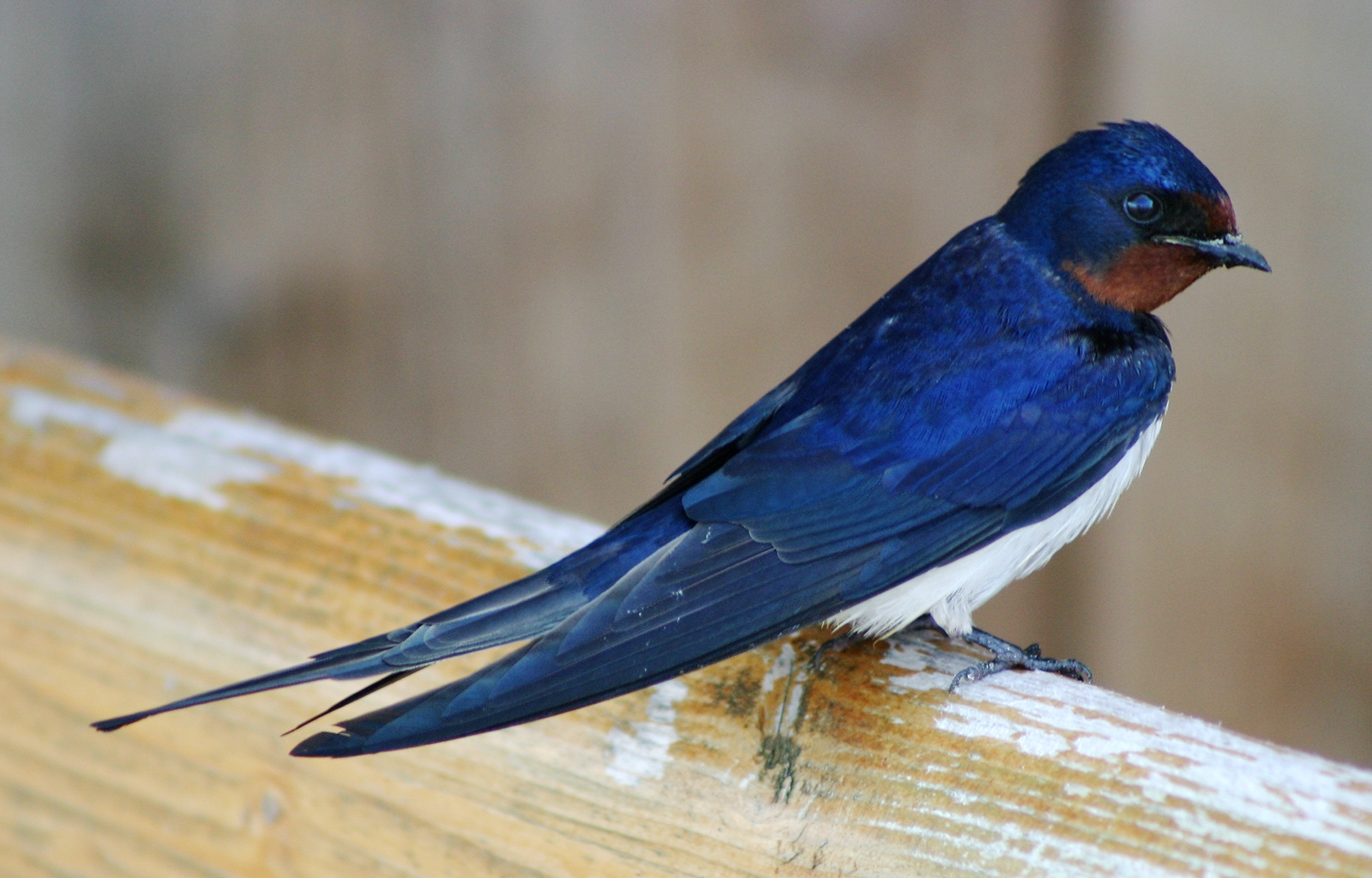
A perched barn swallow. Note the blue plumage.

The family Hirundinidae is adapted to aerial feeding. They have a slender streamlined body, long pointed wings and a short bill with a wide gape. The feet are adapted to perching rather than walking, and the front toes are partially joined at the base.

- Plain martin, Riparia paludicola (Vieillot, 1817) (A)
- Bank swallow, Riparia riparia (Linnaeus, 1758)
- Banded martin, Neophedina cincta (Boddaert, 1783) (A)
- Eurasian crag-martin, Ptyonoprogne rupestris (Scopoli, 1769)
- Rock martin, Ptyonoprogne fuligula (Lichtenstein, MHC, 1842)
- Barn swallow, Hirundo rustica Linnaeus, 1758: Ancient Egyptian: mn.t (meaning uncertain)
- Ethiopian swallow, Hirundo aethiopica Blanford, 1869 (A)
- Red-rumped swallow, Cecropis daurica (Laxmann, 1769)
- Streak-throated swallow, Petrochelidon fluvicola (Blyth, 1855) (A)
- Common house-martin, Delichon urbicum (Linnaeus, 1758)

== Bulbuls ==
Order: Passeriformes Family: Pycnonotidae

Bulbuls are medium-sized songbirds. Some are colourful with yellow, red or orange vents, cheeks, throats or supercilia, but most are drab, with uniform olive-brown to black plumage. Some species have distinct crests.

- Common bulbul, Pycnonotus barbatus (Desfontaines, 1789)
- White-spectacled bulbul, Pycnonotus xanthopygos (Hemprich & Ehrenberg, 1833)

== Leaf warblers ==
Order: Passeriformes Family: Phylloscopidae

Leaf warblers are a family of small insectivorous birds found mostly in Eurasia and ranging into Wallacea and Africa. The species are of various sizes, often green-plumaged above and yellow below, or more subdued with greyish-green to greyish-brown colours.

- Wood warbler, Phylloscopus sibilatrix (Bechstein, 1793)
- Western Bonelli's warbler, Phylloscopus bonelli (Vieillot, 1819)
- Eastern Bonelli's warbler, Phylloscopus orientalis (Brehm, CL, 1855)
- Yellow-browed warbler, Phylloscopus inornatus (Blyth, 1842) (A)
- Dusky warbler, Phylloscopus fuscatus (Blyth, 1842) (A)
- Willow warbler, Phylloscopus trochilus (Linnaeus, 1758)
- Common chiffchaff, Phylloscopus collybita (Vieillot, 1817)
- Greenish warbler, Phylloscopus trochiloides (Sundevall, 1837)

== Bush warblers and allies ==
Order: Passeriformes Family: Scotocercidae

The members of this family are found throughout Africa, Asia, and Polynesia. Their taxonomy is in flux, and some authorities place genus Erythrocerus in another family.

- Scrub warbler, Scotocerca inquieta (Cretzschmar, 1830)
- Cetti's warbler, Cettia cetti (Temminck, 1820) (A)

== Sylviid warblers, parrotbills, and allies ==
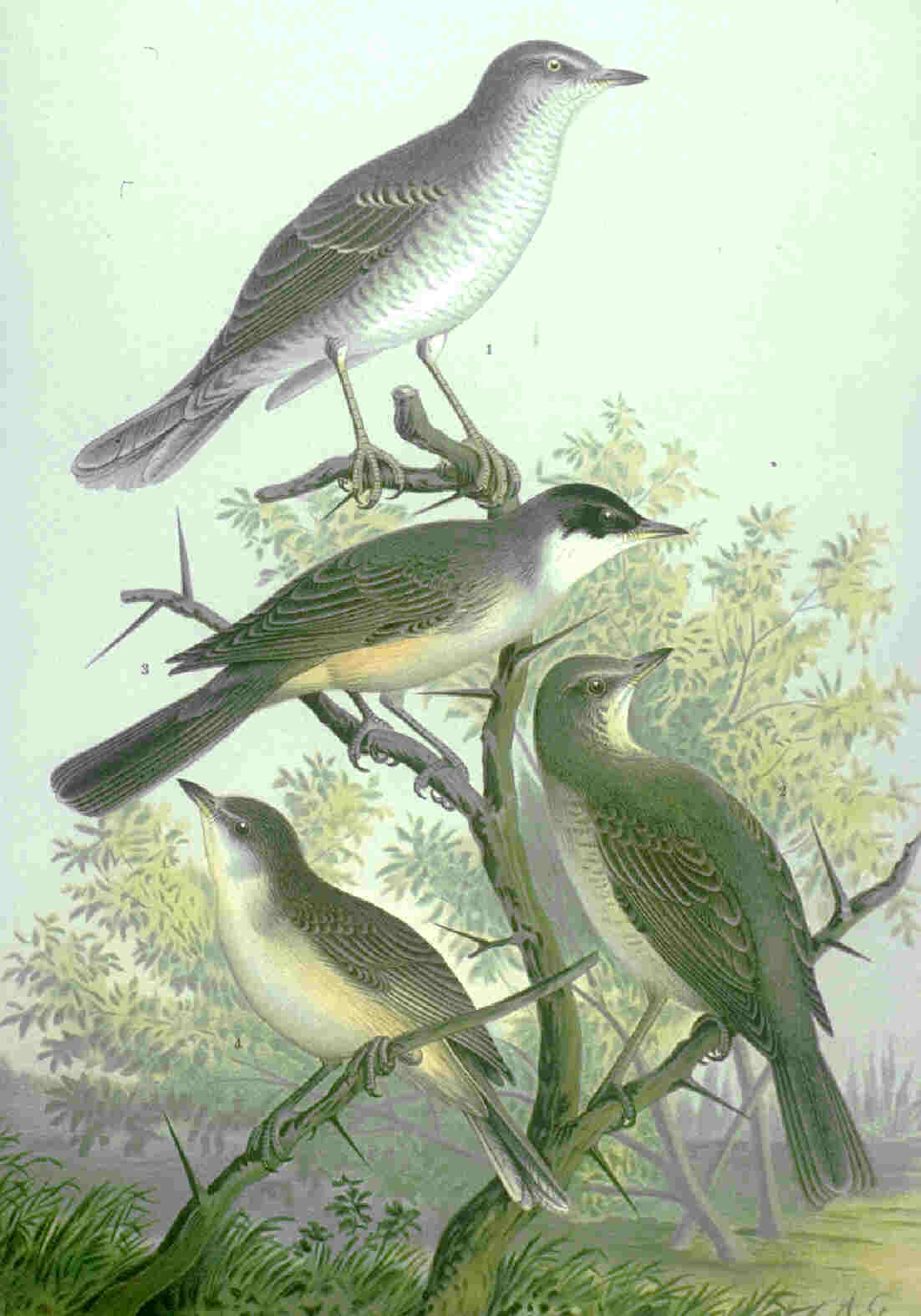
Western Orphean warbler (male in center)

Order: Passeriformes Family: Sylviidae

The family Sylviidae is a group of small insectivorous passerine birds. They mainly occur as breeding species, as the common name implies, in Europe, Asia and, to a lesser extent, Africa. Most are of generally undistinguished appearance, but many have distinctive songs.

- Eurasian blackcap, Sylvia atricapilla (Linnaeus, 1758)
- Garden warbler, Sylvia borin (Boddaert, 1783)
- Barred warbler, Curruca nisoria (Bechstein, 1792)
- Lesser whitethroat, Curruca curruca (Linnaeus, 1758)
- Arabian warbler, Curruca leucomelaena Hemprich & Ehrenberg, 1833
- Eastern Orphean warbler, Curruca crassirostris (Cretzschmar, 1830)
- Asian desert warbler, Curruca nana Hemprich & Ehrenberg, 1833
- Menetries's warbler, Curruca mystacea (Ménétriés, 1832)
- Rüppell's warbler, Curruca ruppeli (Temminck, 1823)
- Cyprus warbler, Curruca melanothorax (Tristram, 1872) (A)
- Sardinian warbler, Curruca melanocephala (Gmelin, JF, 1789)
- Eastern subalpine warbler, Curruca cantillans (Pallas, 1764)
- Greater whitethroat, Curruca communis (Latham, 1787)
- Spectacled warbler, Curruca conspicillata (Temminck, 1820)
- Marmora's warbler, Curruca sarda (Temminck, 1820) (A)

== Laughingthrushes and allies ==
Order: Passeriformes Family: Leiothrichidae

The laughingthrushes are somewhat diverse in size and colouration, but are characterised by soft fluffy plumage.

- Fulvous chatterer, Argya fulva (Desfontaines, 1789)
- Arabian babbler, Argya squamiceps (Cretzschmar, 1827)

== Kinglets ==
Order: Passeriformes Family: Regulidae

The kinglets, also called crests, are a small group of birds often included in the Old World warblers, but frequently given family status because they also resemble the titmice.

- Goldcrest, Regulus regulus (Linnaeus, 1758)
- Common firecrest, Regulus ignicapilla (Temminck, 1820) (A)

== Wrens ==
Order: Passeriformes Family: Troglodytidae

The wrens are mainly small and inconspicuous except for their loud songs. These birds have short wings and thin down-turned bills. Several species often hold their tails upright. All are insectivorous.

- Eurasian wren, Troglodytes troglodytes (Linnaeus, 1758) (A)

== Starlings ==
Order: Passeriformes Family: Sturnidae

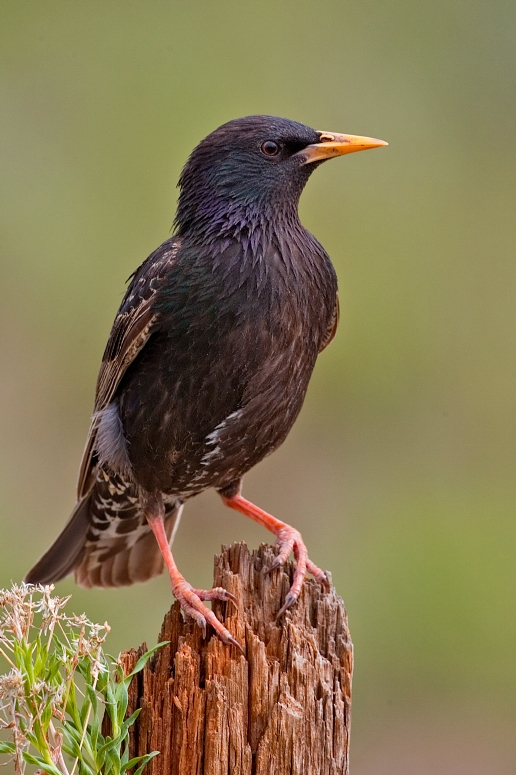
A European starling

Starlings are small to medium-sized passerine birds. Their flight is strong and direct and they are very gregarious. Their preferred habitat is fairly open country. They eat insects and fruit. Plumage is typically dark with a metallic sheen.

- European starling, Sturnus vulgaris Linnaeus, 1758
- Rosy starling, Pastor roseus (Linnaeus, 1758)
- Common myna, Acridotheres tristis (Linnaeus, 1766) (I)
- Tristram's starling, Onychognathus tristramii (Sclater, PL, 1858)

== Thrushes and allies ==
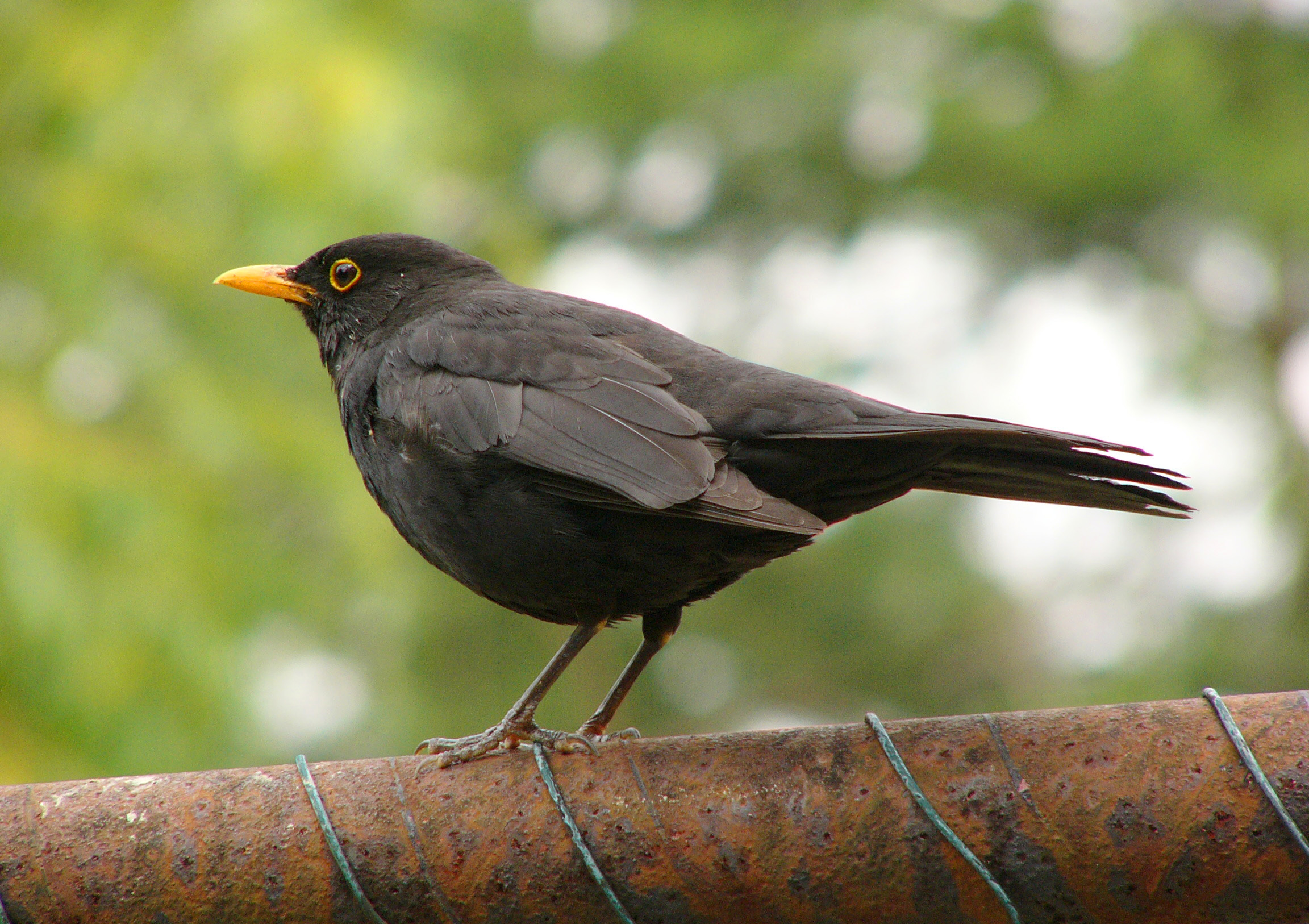
A Eurasian blackbird, also known as a common blackbird

Order: Passeriformes Family: Turdidae

The thrushes are a group of passerine birds that occur mainly in the Old World. They are plump, soft plumaged, small to medium-sized insectivores or sometimes omnivores, often feeding on the ground. Many have attractive songs.

- Mistle thrush, Turdus viscivorus Linnaeus, 1758
- Song thrush, Turdus philomelos Brehm, CL, 1831
- Redwing, Turdus iliacus Linnaeus, 1758
- Eurasian blackbird, Turdus merula Linnaeus, 1758
- Fieldfare, Turdus pilaris Linnaeus, 1758
- Ring ouzel, Turdus torquatus Linnaeus, 1758
- Black-throated thrush, Turdus atrogularis Jarocki, 1819 (A)

== Old World flycatchers ==
Order: Passeriformes Family: Muscicapidae

Old World flycatchers are a large group of small passerine birds native to the Old World. They are mainly small arboreal insectivores. The appearance of these birds is highly varied, but they mostly have weak songs and harsh calls.

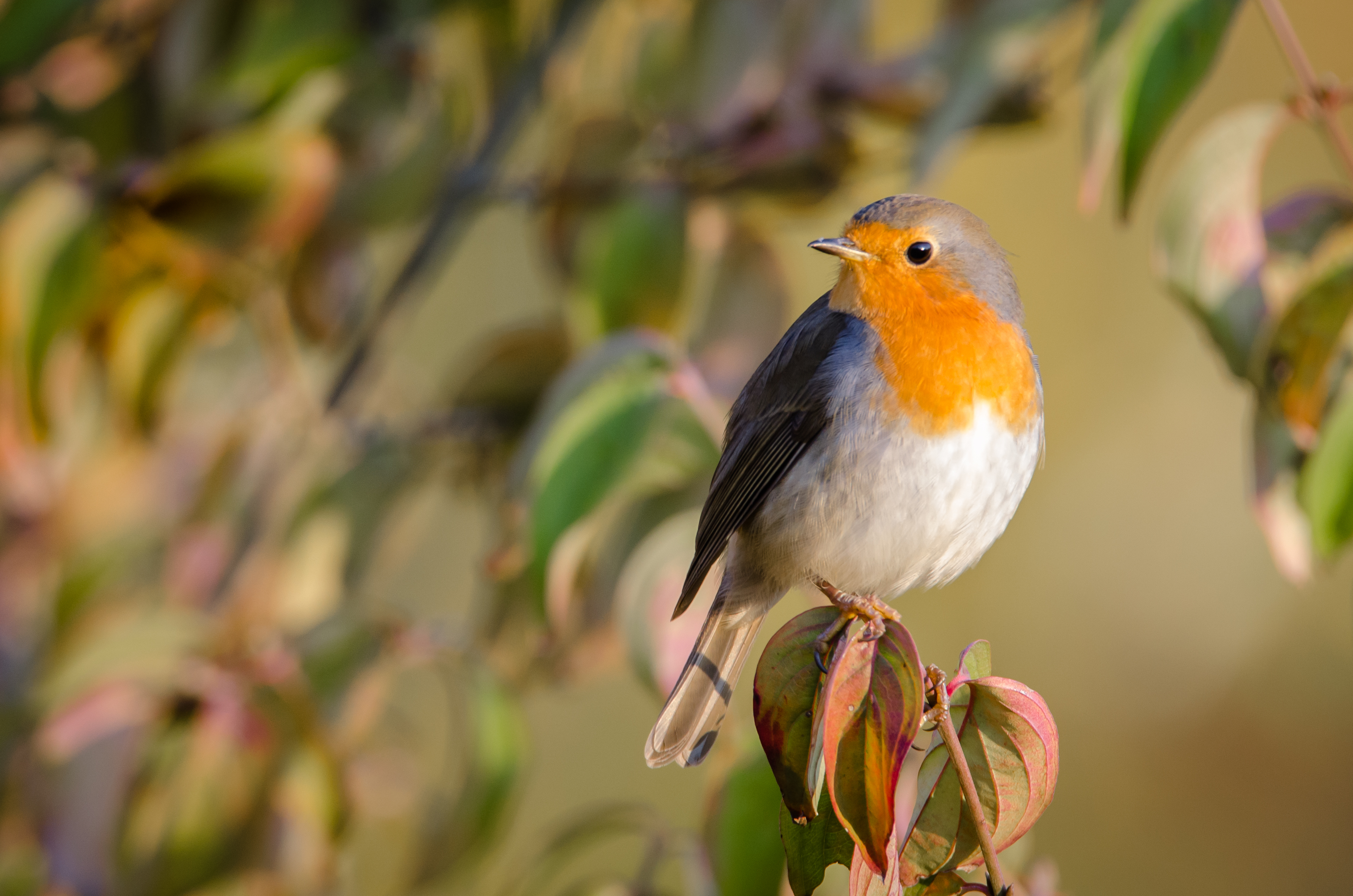
A European robin

- Spotted flycatcher, Muscicapa striata (Pallas, 1764)
- Black scrub-robin, Cercotrichas podobe (Müller, PLS, 1776) (A)
- Rufous-tailed scrub-robin, Cercotrichas galactotes (Temminck, 1820)
- European robin, Erithacus rubecula (Linnaeus, 1758)
- White-throated robin, Irania gutturalis (Guérin-Méneville, 1843) (A)
- Thrush nightingale, Luscinia luscinia (Linnaeus, 1758)
- Common nightingale, Luscinia megarhynchos Brehm, CL, 1831
- Bluethroat, Luscinia svecica (Linnaeus, 1758)
- Red-breasted flycatcher, Ficedula parva (Bechstein, 1792)
- Semicollared flycatcher, Ficedula semitorquata (Homeyer, 1885)
- European pied flycatcher, Ficedula hypoleuca (Pallas, 1764)
- Collared flycatcher, Ficedula albicollis (Temminck, 1815)
- Common redstart, Phoenicurus phoenicurus (Linnaeus, 1758)
- Black redstart, Phoenicurus ochruros (Gmelin, SG, 1774)
- Rufous-tailed rock-thrush, Monticola saxatilis (Linnaeus, 1766)
- Blue rock-thrush, Monticola solitarius (Linnaeus, 1758)
- Whinchat, Saxicola rubetra (Linnaeus, 1758)
- European stonechat, Saxicola rubicola (Linnaeus, 1766)
- Siberian stonechat, Saxicola maurus (Pallas, 1773) (A)
- Pied bushchat, Saxicola caprata (Linnaeus, 1766) (A)
- Northern wheatear, Oenanthe oenanthe (Linnaeus, 1758)
- Isabelline wheatear, Oenanthe isabellina (Temminck, 1829)
- Hooded wheatear, Oenanthe monacha (Temminck, 1825)
- Desert wheatear, Oenanthe deserti (Temminck, 1825)
- Western black-eared wheatear, Oenanthe hispanica (Linnaeus, 1758)
- Cyprus wheatear, Oenanthe cypriaca (Homeyer, 1885)
- Eastern black-eared wheatear, Oenanthe melanoleuca (Güldenstädt, 1775)
- Pied wheatear, Oenanthe pleschanka (Lepechin, 1770) (A)
- Red-rumped wheatear, Oenanthe moesta (Lichtenstein, MHC, 1823)
- Blackstart, Oenanthe melanura (Temminck, 1824)
- White-crowned wheatear, Oenanthe leucopyga (Brehm, CL, 1855)
- Finsch's wheatear, Oenanthe finschii (Heuglin, 1869)
- Mourning wheatear, Oenanthe lugens (Lichtenstein, MHC, 1823)
- Kurdish wheatear, Oenanthe xanthoprymna (Hemprich & Ehrenberg, 1833)
- Persian wheatear, Oenanthe chrysopygia (de Filippi, 1863) (A)

== Hypocolius ==
Order: Passeriformes Family: Hypocoliidae

The hypocolius is a small Middle Eastern bird with the shape and soft plumage of a waxwing. They are mainly a uniform grey colour except the males have a black triangular mask around their eyes.

- Hypocolius, Hypocolius ampelinus Bonaparte, 1850 (A)

== Sunbirds and spiderhunters ==
Order: Passeriformes Family: Nectariniidae

The sunbirds and spiderhunters are very small passerine birds which feed largely on nectar, although they will also take insects, especially when feeding young. Flight is fast and direct on their short wings. Most species can take nectar by hovering like a hummingbird, but usually perch to feed.

- Nile Valley sunbird, Hedydipna metallica (Lichtenstein, MHC, 1823)
- Palestine sunbird, Cinnyris osea Bonaparte, 1856
- Shining sunbird, Cinnyris habessinicus (Hemprich & Ehrenberg, 1828) (A)

== Weavers and allies ==
Order: Passeriformes Family: Ploceidae

The weavers are small passerine birds related to the finches. They are seed-eating birds with rounded conical bills. The males of many species are brightly coloured, usually in red or yellow and black, some species show variation in colour only in the breeding season.

- Village weaver, Ploceus cucullatus (Müller, PLS, 1776) (A)
- Streaked weaver, Ploceus manyar (Horsfield, 1821) (I)

== Waxbills and allies ==
Order: Passeriformes Family: Estrildidae

The estrildid finches are small passerine birds of the Old World tropics and Australasia. They are gregarious and often colonial seed eaters with short thick but pointed bills. They are all similar in structure and habits, but have wide variation in plumage colours and patterns.

- Indian silverbill, Euodice malabarica (Linnaeus, 1758) (I)
- Red avadavat, Amandava amandava (Linnaeus, 1758) (I)

== Accentors ==
Order: Passeriformes Family: Prunellidae

The accentors are in the only bird family, Prunellidae, which is completely endemic to the Palearctic. They are small, fairly drab species superficially similar to sparrows.

- Dunnock, Prunella modularis (Linnaeus, 1758)

== Old World sparrows ==
Order: Passeriformes Family: Passeridae

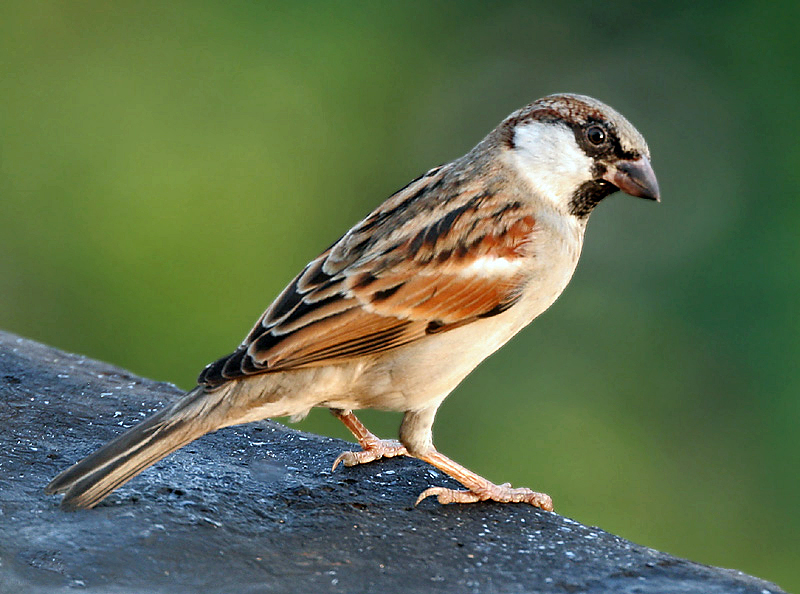
A close-up of a house sparrow

Old World sparrows are small passerine birds. In general, sparrows tend to be small, plump, brown or grey birds with short tails and short powerful beaks. Old World sparrows are seed eaters, but they also consume small insects.

- House sparrow, Passer domesticus (Linnaeus, 1758)
- Spanish sparrow, Passer hispaniolensis (Temminck, 1820)
- Dead Sea sparrow, Passer moabiticus Tristram, 1864 (A)
- Desert sparrow, Passer simplex (Lichtenstein, MHC, 1823) (A)
- Eurasian tree sparrow, Passer montanus (Linnaeus, 1758) (A)
- Yellow-throated sparrow, Gymnoris xanthocollis (Burton, E, 1838) (A)
- Pale rockfinch, Carpospiza brachydactyla (Bonaparte, 1850)
- White-winged snowfinch, Montifringilla nivalis (Linnaeus, 1766) (A)

== Wagtails and pipits ==
Order: Passeriformes Family: Motacillidae

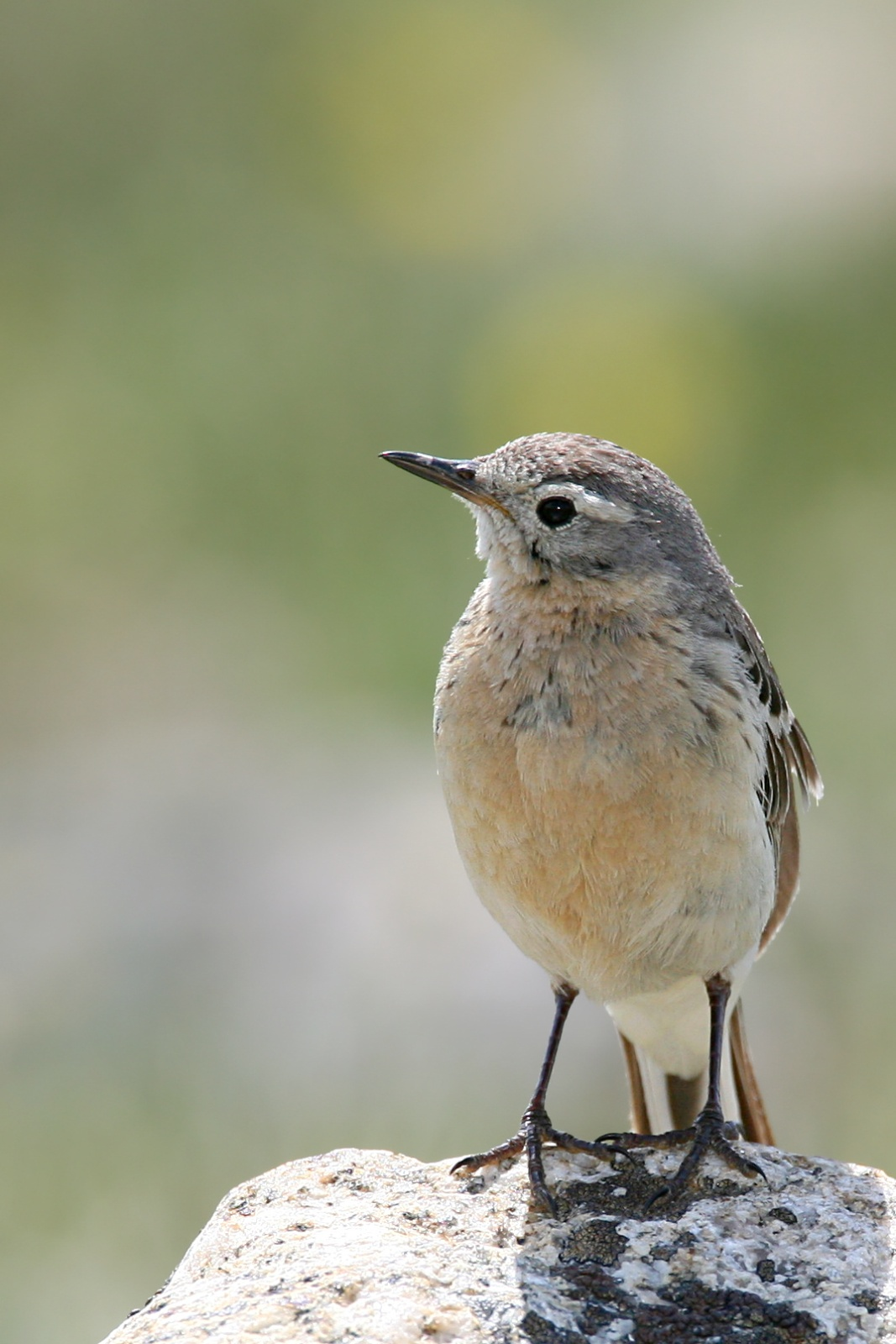
An American pipit

Motacillidae is a family of small passerine birds with medium to long tails. They include the wagtails, longclaws and pipits. They are slender, ground feeding insectivores of open country.

- Gray wagtail, Motacilla cinerea Tunstall, 1771
- Western yellow wagtail, Motacilla flava Linnaeus, 1758; Ancient Egyptian (possibly): bnw (meaning unknown)
- Citrine wagtail, Motacilla citreola Pallas, 1776 (A)
- African pied wagtail, Motacilla aguimp Temminck, 1820
- White wagtail, Motacilla alba Linnaeus, 1758
- Richard's pipit, Anthus richardi Vieillot, 1818 (A)
- Long-billed pipit, Anthus similis (Jerdon, 1840)
- Tawny pipit, Anthus campestris (Linnaeus, 1758)
- Meadow pipit, Anthus pratensis (Linnaeus, 1758)
- Tree pipit, Anthus trivialis (Linnaeus, 1758)
- Olive-backed pipit, Anthus hodgsoni Blackwelder, 1907 (A)
- Red-throated pipit, Anthus cervinus (Pallas, 1811)
- Water pipit, Anthus spinoletta (Linnaeus, 1758)
- American pipit, Anthus rubescens (Tunstall, 1771) (A)

== Finches, euphonias, and allies ==
Order: Passeriformes Family: Fringillidae

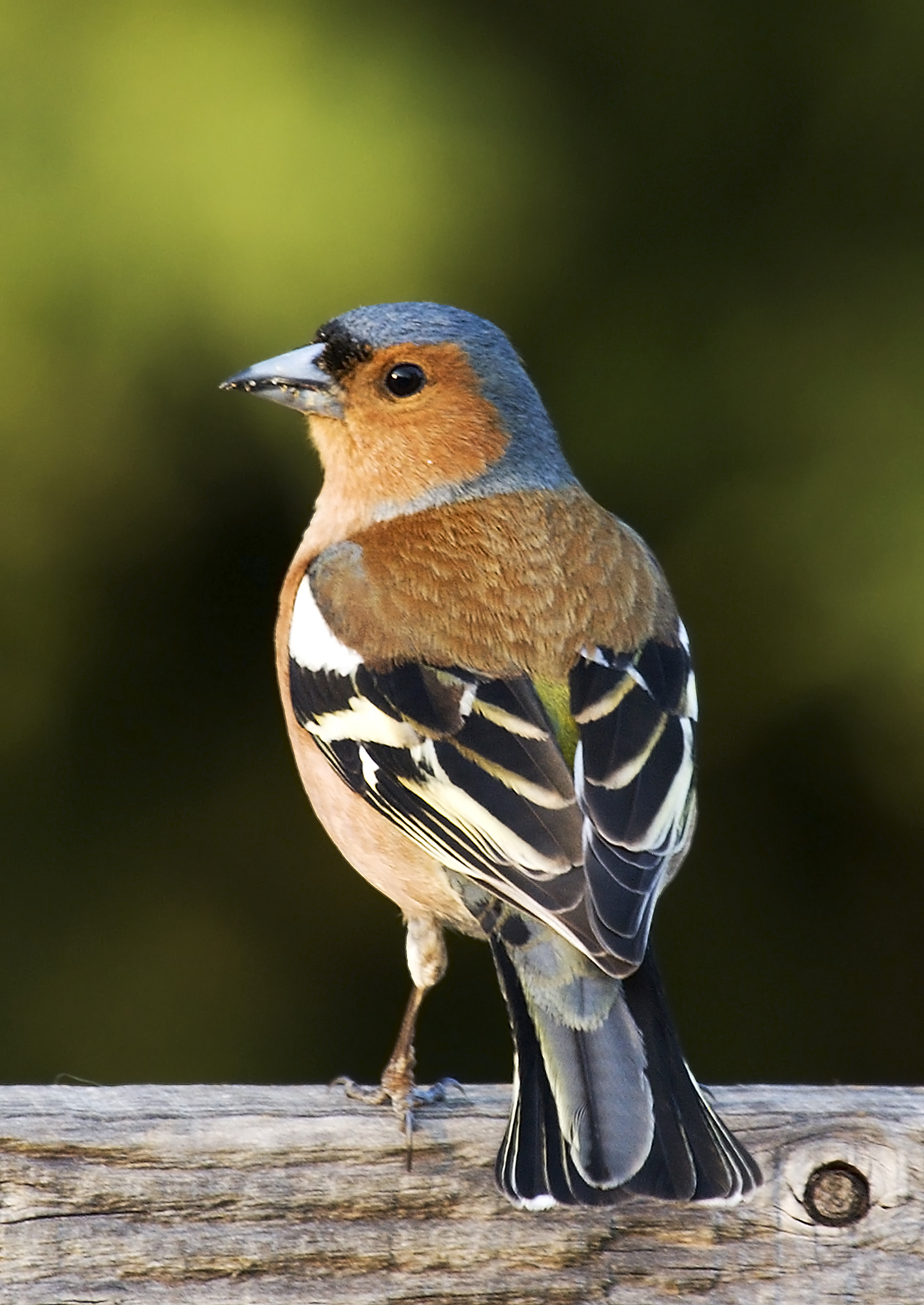
A photograph taken behind a chaffinch

Finches are seed-eating passerine birds, that are small to moderately large and have a strong beak, usually conical and in some species very large. All have twelve tail feathers and nine primaries. These birds have a bouncing flight with alternating bouts of flapping and gliding on closed wings, and most sing well.

- Common chaffinch, Fringilla coelebs Linnaeus, 1758
- Brambling, Fringilla montifringilla Linnaeus, 1758
- Hawfinch, Coccothraustes coccothraustes (Linnaeus, 1758)
- Common rosefinch, Carpodacus erythrinus (Pallas, 1770)
- Sinai rosefinch, Carpodacus synoicus (Temminck, 1825)
- Trumpeter finch, Bucanetes githagineus (Lichtenstein, MHC, 1823)
- Mongolian finch, Rhodopechys mongolicus
- European greenfinch, Chloris chloris (Linnaeus, 1758)
- Eurasian linnet, Linaria cannabina (Linnaeus, 1758)
- European goldfinch, Carduelis carduelis (Linnaeus, 1758)
- European serin, Serinus serinus (Linnaeus, 1766)
- Fire-fronted serin, Serinus pusillus (Pallas, 1811) (A)
- Syrian serin, Serinus syriacus Bonaparte, 1850
- Eurasian siskin, Spinus spinus (Linnaeus, 1758)

== Old World buntings ==
Order: Passeriformes Family: Emberizidae

The emberizids are a large family of passerine birds. They are seed-eating birds with distinctively shaped bills. In Europe, most species are called buntings. Many emberizid species have distinctive head patterns.

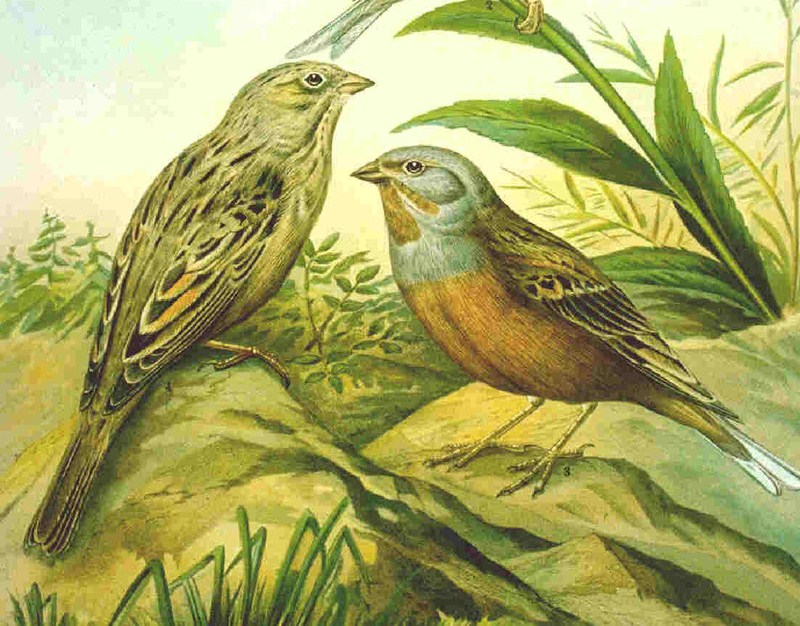
A depiction of two Cretzschmar's buntings

- Black-headed bunting, Emberiza melanocephala Scopoli, 1769
- Red-headed bunting, Emberiza bruniceps Brandt, JF, 1841 (A)
- Corn bunting, Emberiza calandra Linnaeus, 1758
- Cirl bunting, Emberiza cirlus Linnaeus, 1766 (A)
- Gray-necked bunting, Emberiza buchanani Blyth, 1845 (A)
- Cinereous bunting, Emberiza cineracea Brehm, CL, 1855 (A)
- Ortolan bunting, Emberiza hortulana Linnaeus, 1758
- Cretzschmar's bunting, Emberiza caesia Cretzschmar, 1827
- House bunting, Emberiza sahari Levaillant, J, 1850 (A)
- Striolated bunting, Emberiza striolata (Lichtenstein, MHC, 1823)
- Reed bunting, Emberiza schoeniclus (Linnaeus, 1758) (A)
- Yellow-breasted bunting, Emberiza aureola Pallas, 1773 (A)
- Little bunting, Emberiza pusilla Pallas, 1776 (A)
- Rustic bunting, Emberiza rustica Pallas, 1776 (A)

== See also ==
- List of birds
- Lists of birds by region
