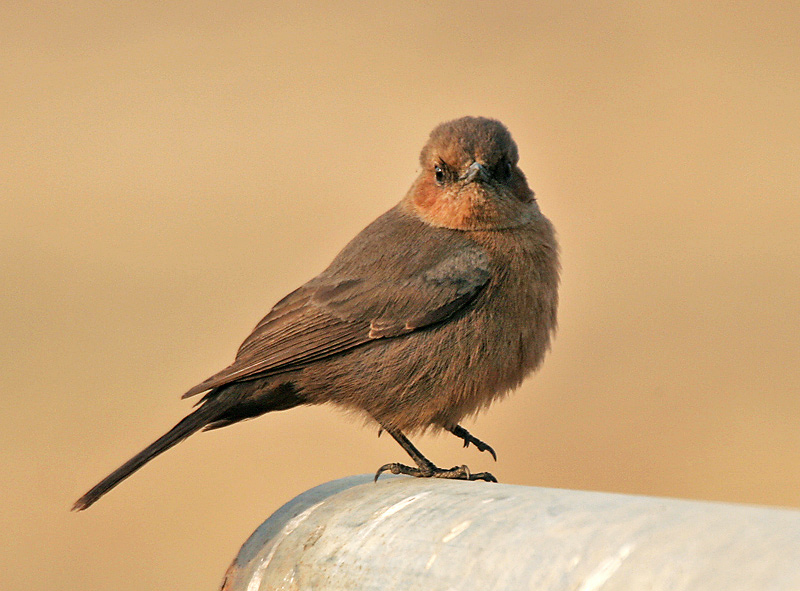

Conservation status
- Least Concern (IUCN 3.1)

Scientific classification
- Kingdom: Animalia
- Phylum: Chordata
- Class: Aves
- Order: Passeriformes
- Family: Muscicapidae
- Genus: Oenanthe
- Species: O. fusca

Binomial name
- Oenanthe fusca (Blyth, 1851)

Synonyms
- Cercomela fusca

= Brown rock chat =

Species of bird (Oenanthe fusca)

The brown rock chat (Oenanthe fusca) or Indian chat is a bird species of the family Muscicapidae. It is found mainly in northern and central India. It is often found in old buildings and rocky areas. It resembles a female Indian robin but lacks the reddish vent and differs in posture and behaviour apart from being larger. In flight it bears some resemblance to thrushes and redstarts. It feeds on insects, captured mainly on the ground. It was formerly placed as the sole species in the genus Cercomela but is now included with the wheatears in the genus Oenanthe.

In central India, the local name of Shama has been noted.

== Description ==
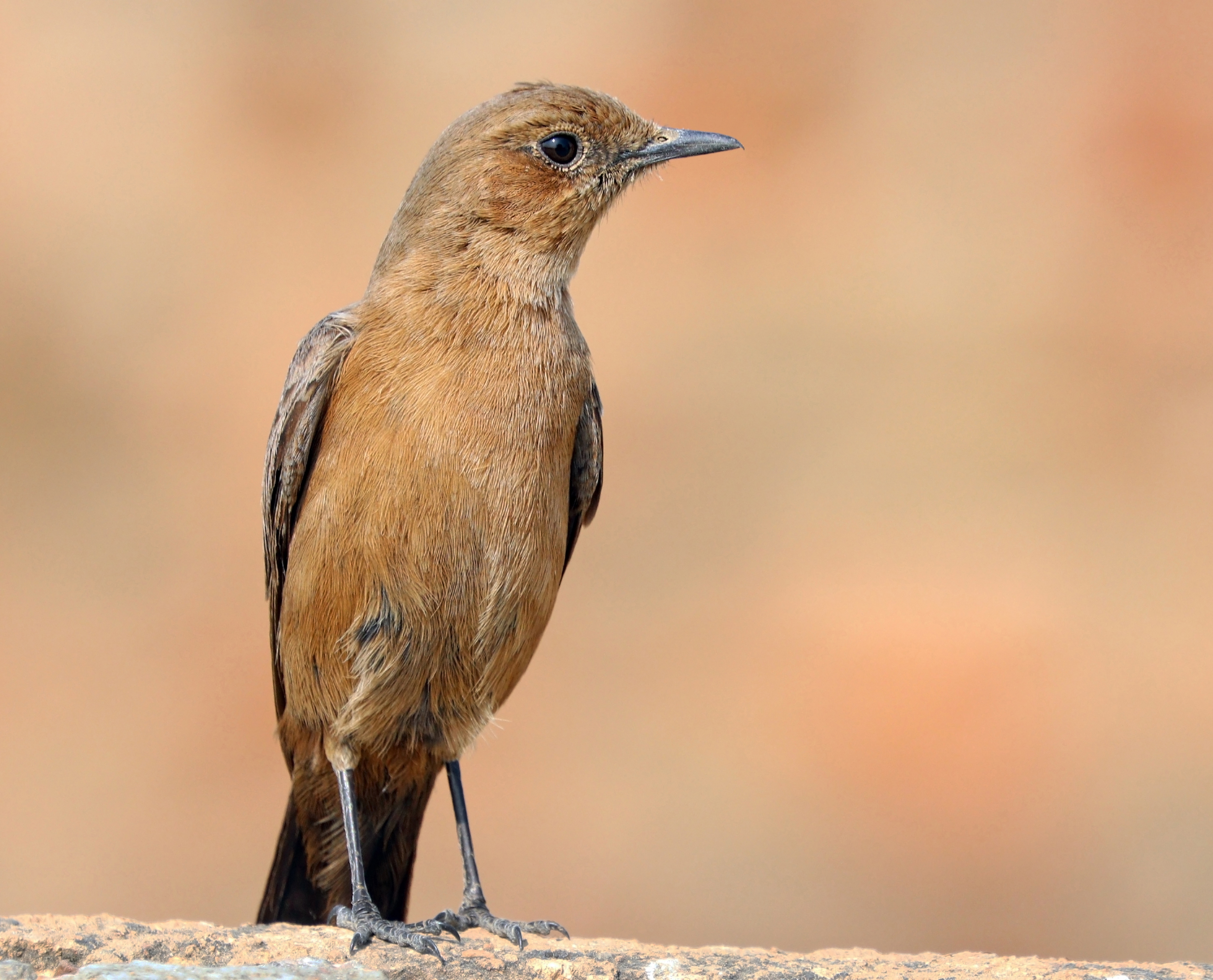

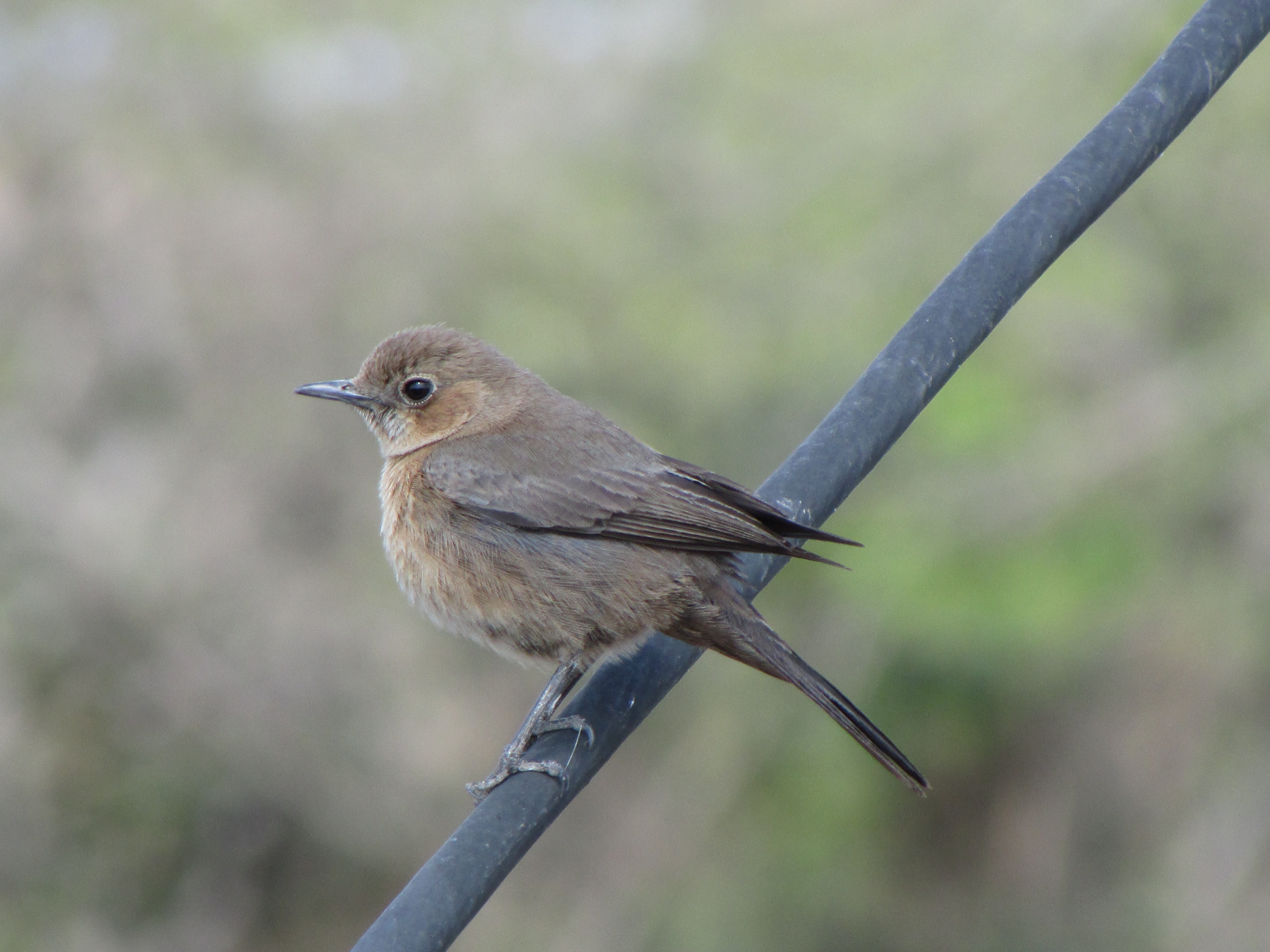
Brown rock chats are often found near human habitation.

The brown rock chat is about 17 cm long, larger than the somewhat similar-looking Indian robin. It is uniformly rufous brown with the wings and tail of a slightly darker shade. The brown on the undersides grades into a dark grey-brown vent. The beak is slender and is slightly curved at the tip. The second primary is the longest and the tail is rounded. In flight it resembles a female blue rock thrush. The sexes are indistinguishable in the field.

== Distribution and habitat ==
The species is nearly endemic to India, distributed north of the Narmada, west to Gujarat (mainly Kutch but extending south) and east to Bengal bordered on the north by the Himalayas where it is found up to about 1300 m in the foothills. Its distribution extends into northern Pakistan west to the Chenab River. Although largely resident, some populations make movements in response to weather. In the foothills of the Himalayas it moves higher up in summer, appearing in Dehra Dun in spring and leaving before the onset of winter. The species has been seen in Nepal. It is a common species although very patchily distributed.

It is usually found singly or in pairs on old buildings or rocky areas.

== Behavior ==
=== Diet and feeding ===
The brown rock chat feeds mainly on insects, picked off the ground. They have been known to feed late and forage on insects attracted to artificial lighting. When feeding on the ground it sometimes flicks open its wings and tail. It also has a habit of slowly raising its tail slightly, fanning it and bobbing its head.

=== Vocalizations ===
Brown rock chats have a wide repertoire of calls. Nearly eight different kinds of calls have been noted, including territorial calls, begging calls, feeding calls, alarm calls, threat calls, contact calls, distress calls, roosting calls and emergence calls. The most common call is a short whistled chee delivered with a rapid bob and stretch, and the alarm call is a harsh chek-check.

The song is thrush-like with a number of notes, often including imitations of the calls and songs of other bird species including the yellow-eyed babbler, black-winged cuckooshrike and Tickell's blue flycatcher.

=== Breeding ===
The breeding season extends from spring to summer and more than one brood is raised. The nest is a cup of grass, hair and clods placed in a ledge in a roadside cutting, wall or window, sometimes even on occupied houses. The foundation of the nest is made up of pebbles and clay. The nests are guarded against intruders and the parents will chase palm squirrels and other birds that approach too close. The usual clutch is three to four pale blue eggs which are incubated by the female alone. The young leave the nest about two weeks after hatching.

== Taxonomy and systematics ==
- - - Oenanthe fusca
    - Oenanthe picata
  - - - - - - Oenanthe finschii
            - Oenanthe lugens
          - Oenanthe xanthoprymna
        - Oenanthe alboniger
      - - Oenanthe leucura
        - Oenanthe leucopyga
- - Oenanthe melanura
  - Oenanthe familiaris

The close relatives of the brown rock chat.

The species was described by Edward Blyth in 1851 under the binomial name Saxicola fusca based on a specimen from Mathura ("Muttra" in original). It is considered to be monotypic although Walter Koelz suggested a new subspecies ruinarum in 1939 based on a specimen from Bhopal. It was the only species of Cercomela found outside Africa and its placement was questioned in the past. Molecular phylogenetic studies in 2010 and 2012 found that the genus Cercomela was polyphyletic, with five species, including the brown rock chat, nested within the genus Oenanthe. As part of a reorganization of the species to create monophyletic genera, the brown rock chat was assigned to the genus Oenanthe.
