= Maghreb wheatear =

Conservation status
- Not evaluated (IUCN 3.1)

Scientific classification
- Kingdom: Animalia
- Phylum: Chordata
- Class: Aves
- Order: Passeriformes
- Family: Muscicapidae
- Genus: Oenanthe
- Species: O. halophila

Binomial name
- Oenanthe halophila Tristram, 1859

Species of bird

The Maghreb wheatear (Oenanthe halophila) is a species of bird in the family Muscicapidae. It is found throughout the Maghreb in north-western Africa. It was formally described by Henry Baker Tristram in 1859. It is monotypic.

== Etymology ==
The genus name Oenanthe comes from two Greek words- οινη (oinē) "vine" and ανθος (anthos) "bloom", which referred to its plumage in the vintage season.

The specific epithet halophila comes from two Greek words - (ἁλος halos) "sea salt" and φιλος (philos) "loving".

== Taxonomy and systematics ==
This species was formerly considered conspecific with the mourning wheatear, Arabian wheatear, Abyssinian wheatear and the Finsch's wheatear, but it was separated from them using mitochondrial DNA evidence.

This species was formally described by Henry Baker Tristram in 1859 in the article Characters of apparently new species of Birds collected in the great Desert of the Sahara, southwards of Algeria and Tunis, in the journal Ibis. This species was described from male and female syntypes collected from Oumache, south of Biskra, in Algeria collected on 19 January 1857 by Tristram.

== Description ==
It is a small bird, 14-16 cm in length and it weighs about 19-25 grams. The breeding male has a black throat, face, neck, wings and upper back; the lower back and the tail are white in color. The underparts are white, with a buff-colored vent, and a black bill and legs. The nonbreeding male has a whitish-stained crown, while the female is similar to the male, but is duller on the mantle and throat.

The juvenile is buff-colored, streaked brown above and buff below, with blackish ear-coverts and faint gray breast scaling.

== Vocalisations ==
The song is a series of warbling phrases, separated by pauses of 2-4 seconds. This species sometimes mimics sympatric species, such as the desert wheatear or the desert lark.

This species also gives a downward deflecting pjuu call, repeated several times. It also gives a chac call, which may be repeated along with the pjuu call. It sings from a prominnet perch, such as a rock or a boulder.

== Habits and habitat ==
=== Habitat ===
Habitat in Souss-Massa-Drâa, Morocco, where this species has been sighted

This species inhabits sloping, broken desert country, often with limestone escarpments, caves for shelter, and rocky slopes, and sometimes in villages. In Tunisia this species keeps to mountains and avoids the coastal plains.

=== Migration ===
During the non-breeding season this species moves into areas bordering the Sahara.

Egg

=== Breeding ===
This species is double brooded and makes its nest in a flat cup made of grass, stems and roots, lined with hair and wool. The nest is placed in a hole deep in a rock or cliff. This species lays 3-6 eggs, which are pale to greenish blue in color and spotted with red and violet. The incubation period is 13-14 days and the nestling period is 14-16 days.

=== Diet ===
The main part of its diet is ants, but it may also feed on beetles, butterflies and grasshoppers. It forages by sallying in the air for insects, by flying down onto prey from a low perch.
