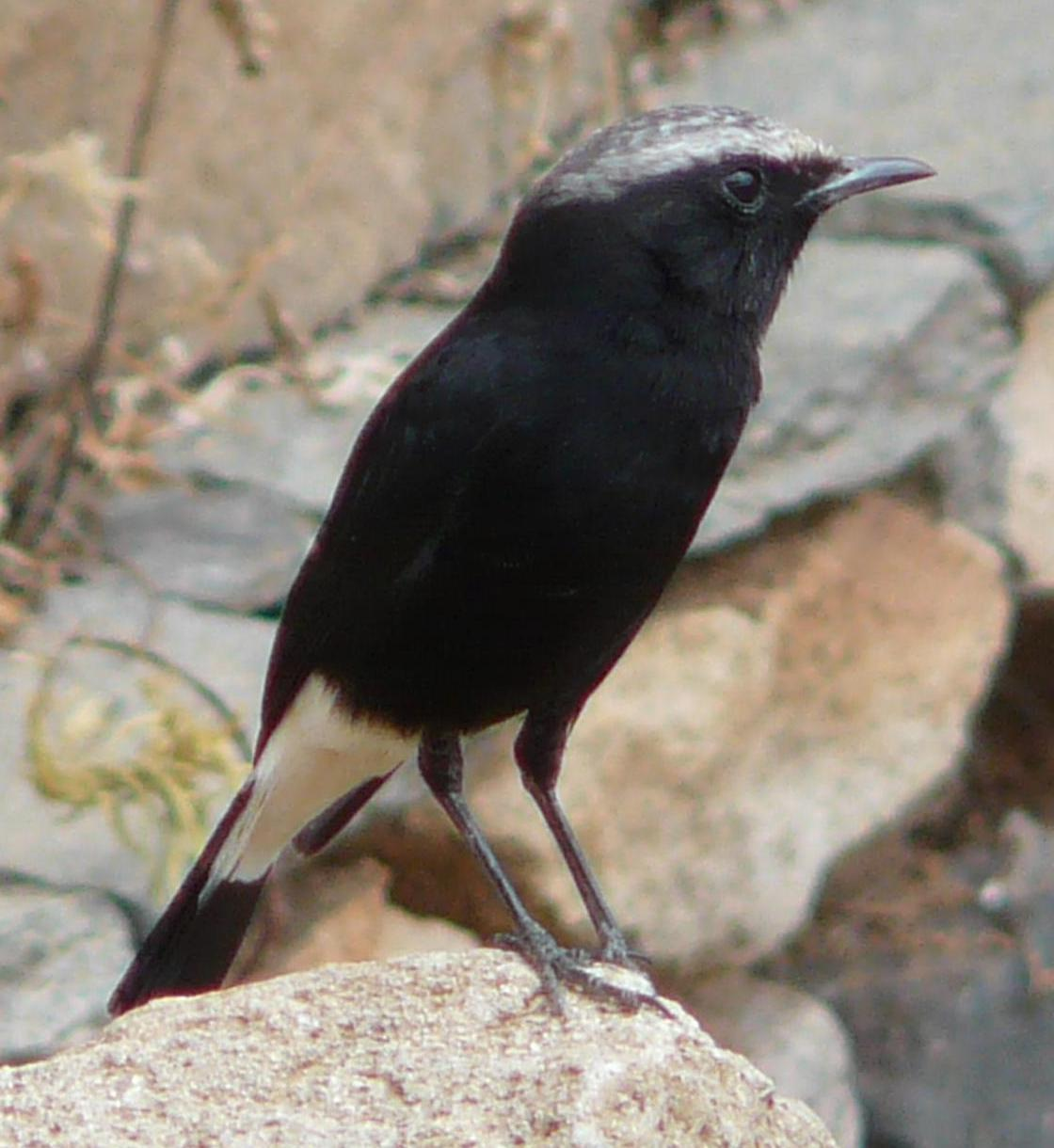

Scientific classification
- Kingdom: Animalia
- Phylum: Chordata
- Class: Aves
- Order: Passeriformes
- Family: Muscicapidae
- Genus: Oenanthe
- Species: O. lugubris

Binomial name
- Oenanthe lugubris (Rüppell, 1837)

Synonyms
- Saxicola lugubris Rüppell, 1837

= Abyssinian wheatear =

Species of bird

The Abyssinian wheatear (Oenanthe lugubris), or Abyssinian black wheatear, is a species of bird in the family Muscicapidae, the Old World flycatchers and chats. It is found from Ethiopia to southern Kenya and north-eastern Tanzania.

== Taxonomy ==
The Abyssinian wheatear was first formally described in 1837 as Saxicola lugubris by the German naturalist and explorer Eduard Rüppell with its type locality given as "the rocky valleys of the Abyssinian province of Simien, and on the volcanic hills around Gondar" (Vorkommen in der felsigen Thälern der Abyssinischen provinz Simen, und auf der vulkanischen Hügeln um Gondar). It is regarded, by some authorities, as being the same species as the mourning wheatear (Oenanthe lugens) of Northern Africa and the Middle East but the I.O.C. regard it as a valid species. The Abyssinian wheatear is regarded as closely related to the Arabian wheatear (Oenanthe lugentoides), which has also been regarded as being the same species as the mourning wheatear. These species may form a species complex.

=== Subspecies ===
The I.O.C. recognises the following subspecies:

- Oenanthe lugubris lugubris (Rüppell, 1837)
- Oenanthe lugubris schalowi (Fischer & Reichenow, 1884)
- Oenanthe lugubris vauriei Meinertzhagen, 1949

Schalow's wheatear (O. l. schalowi) from the highlands of southern Kenya and northeastern Tanzania is regarded as a valid species by some authorities but the I.O.C. has pended its endorsement of this position while it waits for the results of genetic studies to be published. O. l. vauriei is found in northeastern Somalia.

== Description ==
The Abyssinian wheatear is a dark wheatear which shows sexual dichromatism, with the males being darker than the females. The males have black upperparts, throat and breast and a grey cap with darker streaks. The colour of the belly varies, both within individuals and geographic populations, from white to black. The females are mainly dark brown with heavy streaking on their paler breast and belly. Both males and females have buff under tail coverts, and the tail has a black inverted T pattern on a buff background, best seen in flight. The length of the nominate subspecies is 14 cm (5.5 in).

=== Subspecific variation ===
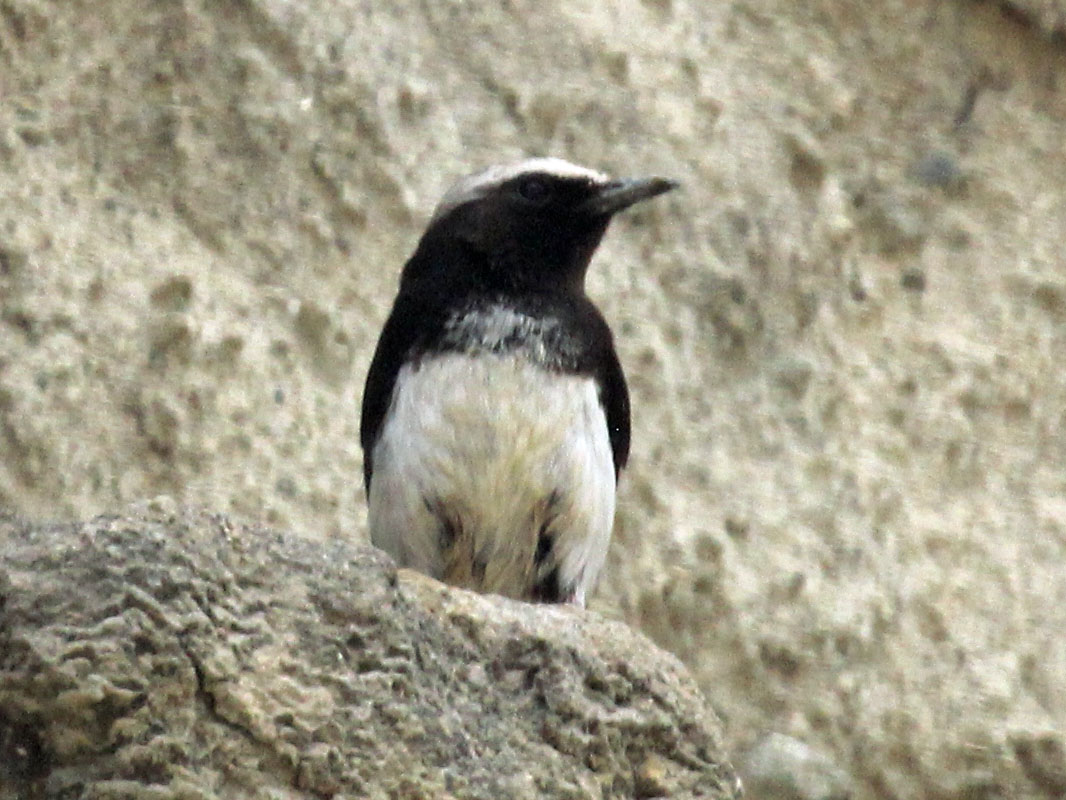
Oenanthe l. schalowi

The three subspecies of Abyssinian wheatear vary as follows:

- O. l. lugubris: The males have a grey or greyish brown crown with darker streaks, a black face and upper parts with buff rump and upper tail coverts change in colour from buff to white at the base and the upper sides of the tail. The extent of white on the underparts varies, with most birds being black except for the white under tail coverts, while others may have black restricted to the throat and breast. The females have dark brown upper parts apart from the white, buff, or light orange rump and upper tail coverts, with the underparts being greyish buff with darker streaks on the throats and breasts, which frequently extend onto the whitish flanks.
- O. l. schalowi: This subspecies is a little larger than the nominate subspecies and has browner upper parts with a buff orange lower belly and upper tail coverts.
- O.l. vauriei: In this subspecies, the males have a pale greyish white to dull sooty buff crown streaked with brown, and a blackish forehead. The crown colour can extend as a diffuse patch onto the upper mantle, while the remainder of the upper parts of the rump is black with pale fringes on the fresh feathers. The rump and upper tail coverts are white to orange buff, a little lighter in colour than those on Schalow's wheatear. The lower head and upper breast are black, with the lower breast and flanks being greyish white with a white belly and buff under tail coverts. The females of this subspecies are paler than female Schalow's wheatear.

== Distribution and habitat ==
The Abyssinian wheatear is found in northeastern Africa, from Eritrea and northwestern Somalia south to northeastern Tanzania. The subspecies schalowi occurs in southern Kenya and northern Tanzania, while vauriei in eastern Somalia, and they both have disjunct ranges from the nominate subspecies of Eritrea, Ethiopia, and northwestern Somalia. This bird occurs in rocky areas where there are some trees and bushes.

== Behaviour ==
Abyssinian wheatears are normally solitary outside their breeding season, and in the breeding season, they are typically encountered in pairs. They are generally unafraid of humans and perch in plain sight on rocks, boulders, and shrubs. They may be inactive and shelter during midday. Their diet is mainly invertebrates, caught by dropping on them from a perch or by foraging on the ground. They will also eat fruit, such as berries.

=== Breeding ===
The Abyssinian wheatear breeds from the early spring to late summer (March to August) in Ethiopia and Eritrea, in April and May in Somalia, from April to July in the Kenyan Great Rift Valley, and in March in northern Tanzania. The males display by adopting an upright stance with their heads raised before hopping around the female with droopy, quivering wings, interrupted by quick chases of the female in flight. The female makes the nest in the form of a loose cup with a flat top of the grass and other plant material, lined with softer material such as moss or mammal hair. There may be a small platform of stones either at the entrance to the nest, under it, or around it. The nest is typically situated in a crevice or hole with a maximum depth of 45 cm (18 in). This may be among rocks, on cliffs, in stone walls, on the banks of a river, or side of a wadi. They are double-brooded, and each clutch is 5 to 6 eggs. The juveniles from the first brood have been recorded bringing food to the nestlings of the 2nd brood in Schalow's wheatear.

=== Migration ===
Abyssinian wheatears are largely resident, with some post-breeding dispersal. The subspecies vauriei disappears from its eastern Somali breeding areas from June to January and may migrate to lower altitudes when not breeding.
