= Oenanthe pongraczi =

Oenanthe pongraczi Temporal range: Pliocene

Scientific classification
- Kingdom: Animalia
- Phylum: Chordata
- Class: Aves
- Order: Passeriformes
- Family: Muscicapidae
- Genus: Oenanthe
- Species: †O. pongraczi

Binomial name
- †Oenanthe pongraczi Kessler, 2013

Extinct species of bird

Oenanthe pongraczi is an extinct species of Oenanthe that inhabited Hungary during the Neogene period.

== Etymology ==
The specific epithet is a tribute to Pongrácz László who created the "Beszélő Kövek" Foundation.
