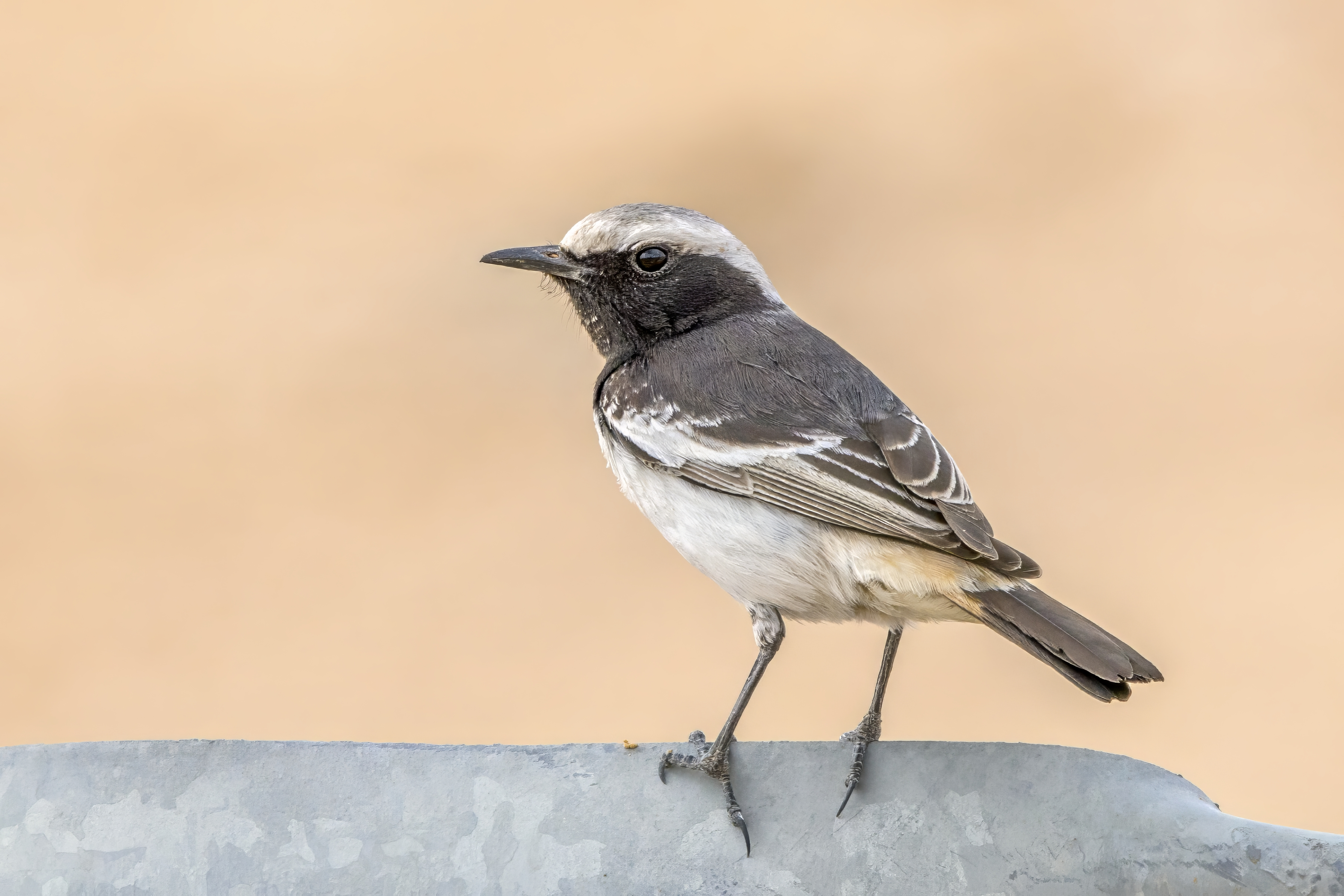
- Male
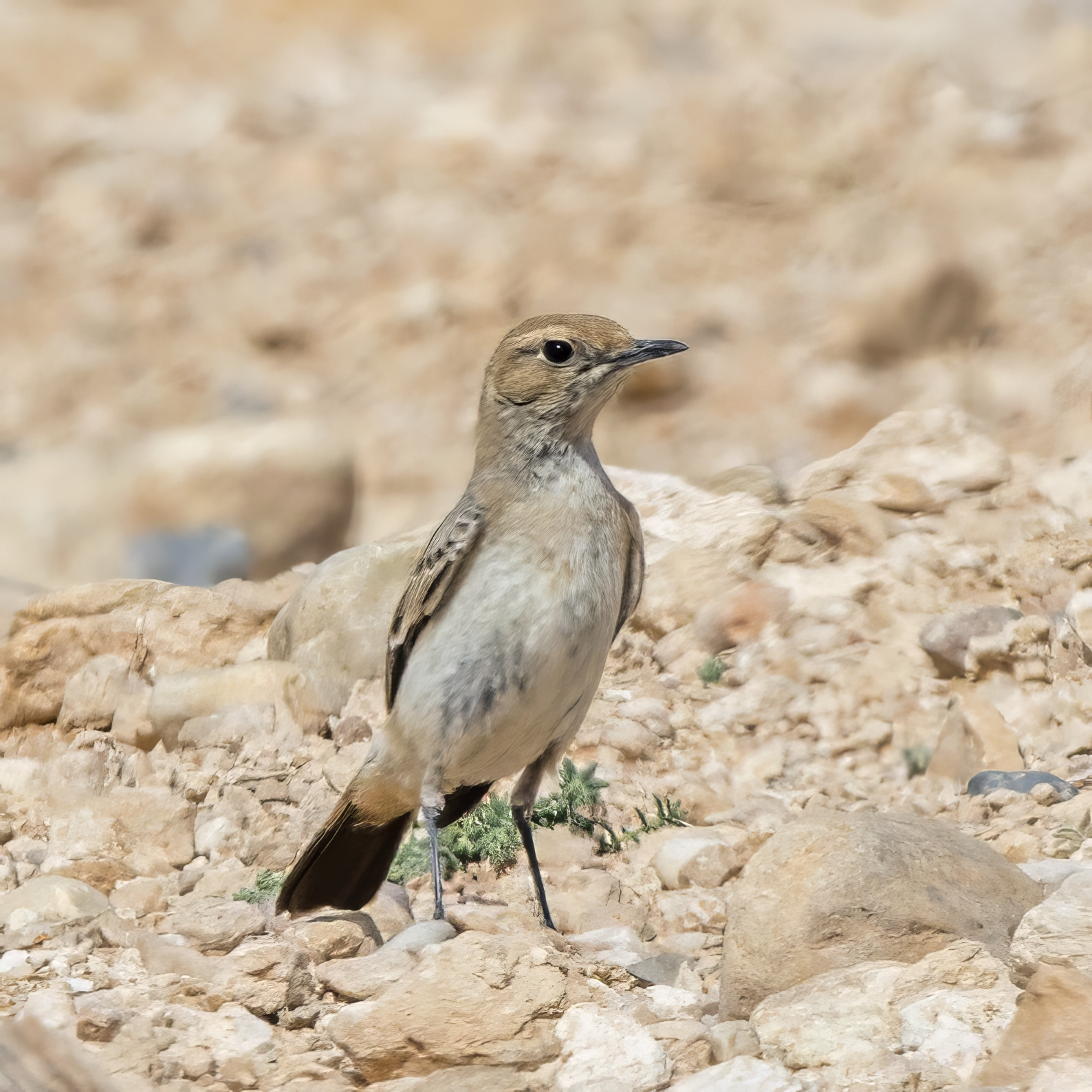
- Female both near Douz, Kébili, Tunisia

Conservation status
- Least Concern (IUCN 3.1)

Scientific classification
- Kingdom: Animalia
- Phylum: Chordata
- Class: Aves
- Order: Passeriformes
- Family: Muscicapidae
- Genus: Oenanthe
- Species: O. moesta

Binomial name
- Oenanthe moesta (Lichtenstein, MHC, 1823)

= Red-rumped wheatear =

Species of bird

The red-rumped wheatear or buff-rumped wheatear (Oenanthe moesta) is a species of bird in the family Muscicapidae. It is found in North Africa and the Middle East.

== Description ==
The red-rumped wheatear is a compact, big-headed wheatear with a rufous rump and all dark tail. the male has a grey crown and nape with a black throat and face and white supercilium. The shoulders and back are black with white fringes to the feathers, the rump and base of the tail are rufous and the distal part of the tail is black. Female is paler with a rufous crown and cheeks. Juveniles are similar to females but are less rufous and do show faint spots and streaks. Length is 16 cm. The fly low to the ground with a loose flapping flight that resembles a skylark.

=== Voice ===
The territorial song, given by both sexes, seems to vary geographically from a harsher chattering song in the west to a more melodious. pleasant and repetitive "twee-churr-urr-urr" in Cyrenaica. The courtship song sounds like an old fashioned boiling kettle, a long warbling whistle rising in pitch given in duet by both sexes. The alarm and contact calls are typically chat like harsh clicks.

== Distribution and subspecies ==
There are two recognised subspecies of Red-rumped wheatear, they are:

- Oenanthe moesta brooksbanki Meinertzhagen, 1923 - southern Syria and Jordan to north-western Saudi Arabia and south-western Iraq.
- Oenanthe moesta moesta (Lichtenstein, 1823) = North Africa from extreme north of Mauritania to coastal north-west Egypt.

== Habitat ==
The red-rumped wheatear avoids real deserts and is normally found in flat areas, especially near saline or barren areas. In Morocco uses more vegetated areas than the desert wheatear and also found in rocky hills.

== Habits ==
The red-rumped wheatear has a prolonged breeding season from late February through to June in North Africa, and it may have up to three broods. The nest is usually placed in a small mammal's burrow, up to 2m underground, or sometimes in a natural hole or a cavity in a wall and sometimes hidden under a bush. The nest is a cup made out of plant material and lined with feathers, woo, and hair, and even shed snakeskin. The clutch is 4-5 but very little is known about the breeding behaviour of this species.
