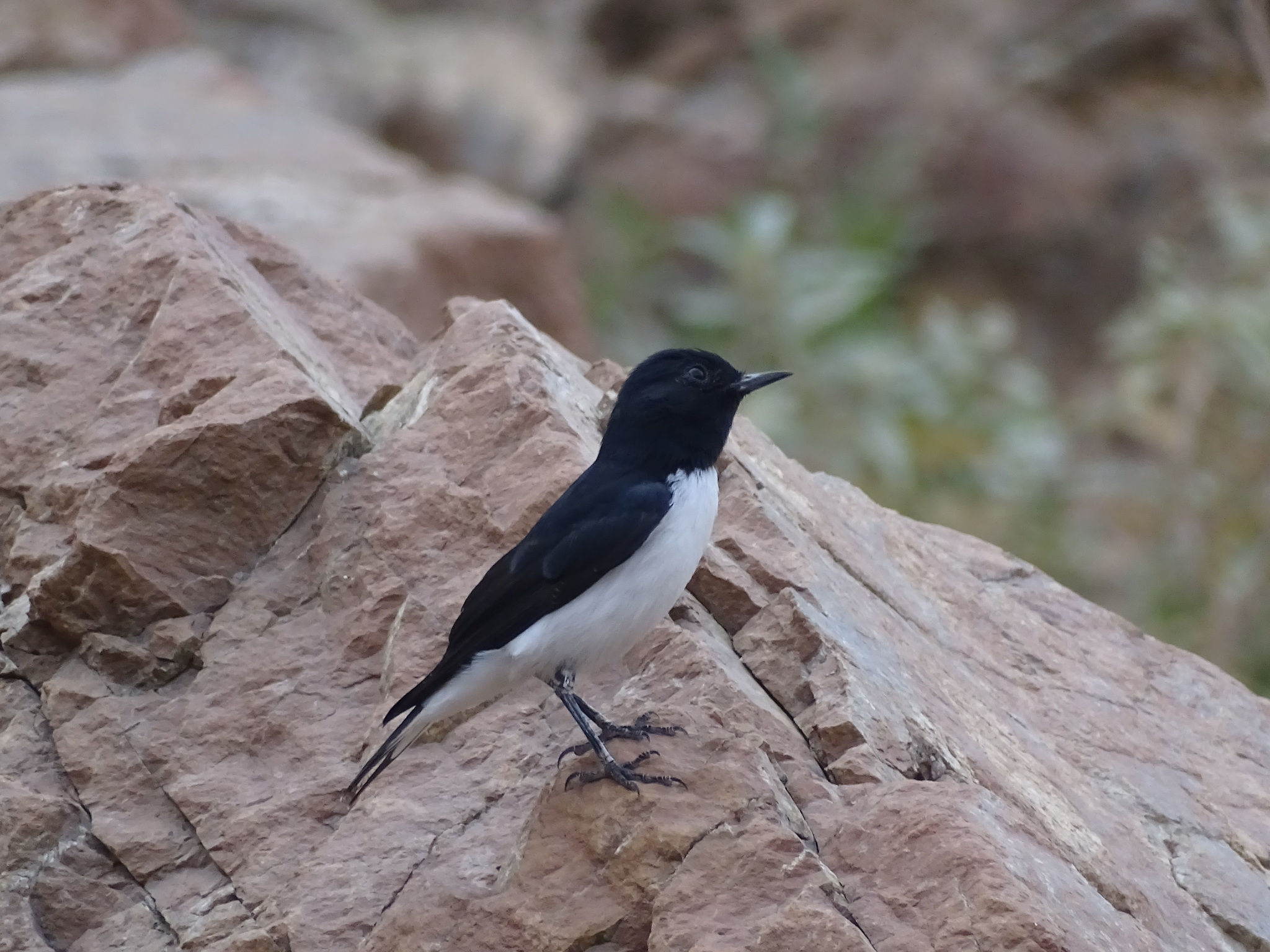

Conservation status
- Least Concern (IUCN 3.1)

Scientific classification
- Kingdom: Animalia
- Phylum: Chordata
- Class: Aves
- Order: Passeriformes
- Family: Muscicapidae
- Genus: Oenanthe
- Species: O. albonigra

Binomial name
- Oenanthe albonigra (Hume, 1872)

= Hume's wheatear =

Species of bird

Hume's wheatear (Oenanthe albonigra) is a species of bird in the Old World flycatcher family Muscicapidae. This black-and-white bird is found in southern Afghanistan, Iran, extreme northeast Iraq, Oman, Pakistan, Qatar and the United Arab Emirates.

== Taxonomy ==
Hume's wheatear was formally described in 1872 by the British naturalist Allan Octavian Hume from specimens collected on rocky slopes in what is now southern Pakistan. He placed it with the chats in the genus Saxicola and coined the binomial name Saxicola alboniger. Hume's wheatear is now placed with 32 other species in the genus Oenanthe that was introduced by the French ornithologist Louis Vieillot in 1816. The species is monotypic: no subspecies are recognised.

== Description ==
Hume's wheatear is a large wheatear with a dark black head and back contrasting sharply with a pure white breast and belly. Both sexes exhibit this same coloration. While closely resembling the male of the 'picata' form of Variable wheatear, key distinctions include Hume's wheatear's larger size, a more substantial bill, and longer wings. Additionally, the black coloration on Hume's wheatear is restricted to the head and throat, while the white extends further up the back.

== Status ==
The species has a wide distribution range, stable population trends, and is presumed to have a large population, although precise estimates have not been conducted. As a result, it is classified as "Least Concern" by the International Union for Conservation of Nature (IUCN).
