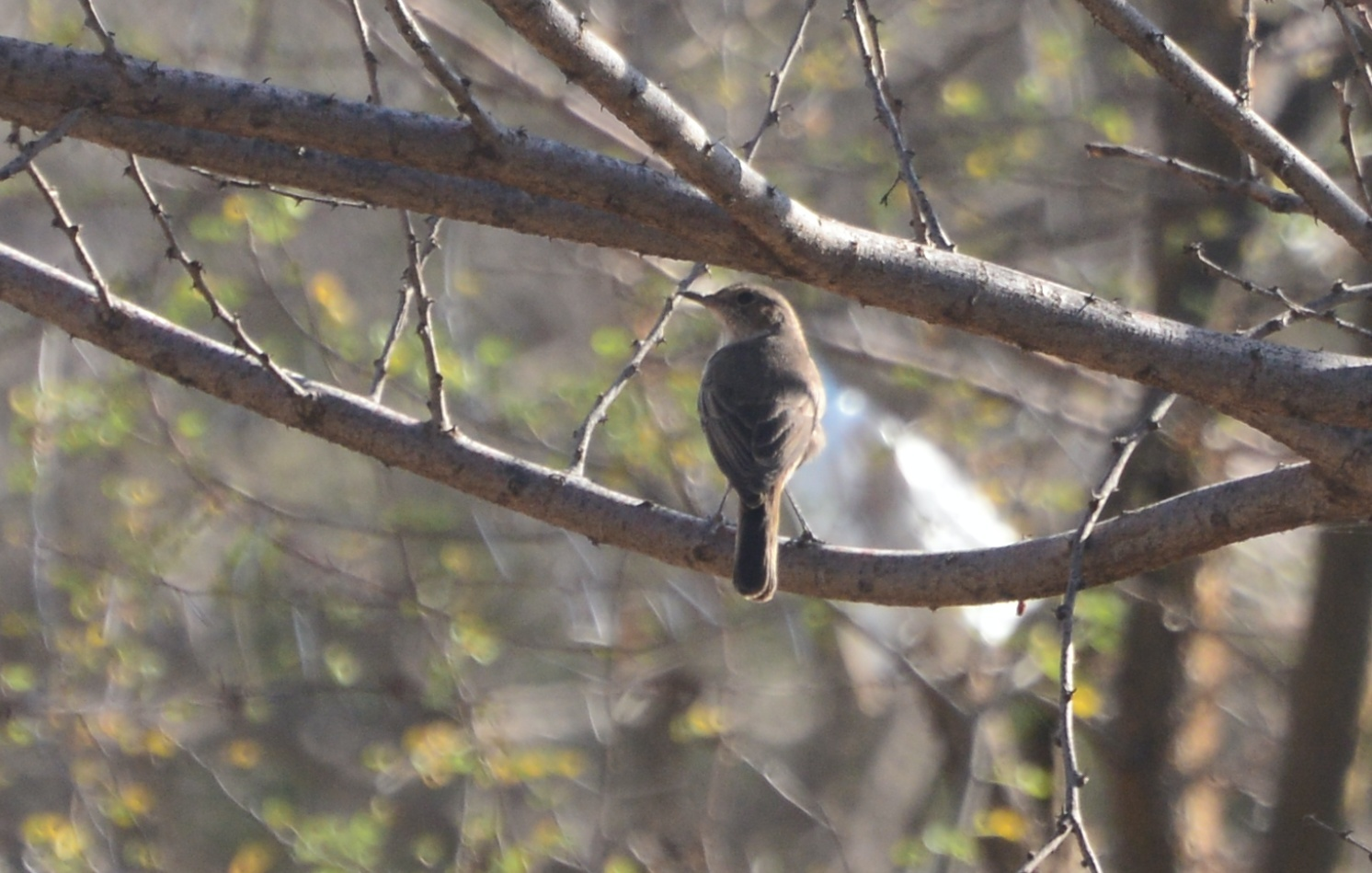

Conservation status
- Least Concern (IUCN 3.1)

Scientific classification
- Kingdom: Animalia
- Phylum: Chordata
- Class: Aves
- Order: Passeriformes
- Family: Muscicapidae
- Genus: Oenanthe
- Species: O. scotocerca

Binomial name
- Oenanthe scotocerca (Heuglin, 1869)

Synonyms
- Cercomela scotocerca

= Brown-tailed rock chat =

Species of bird

The brown-tailed rock chat (Oenanthe scotocerca) is a species of bird in the family Muscicapidae. It is found in Chad, Eritrea, Ethiopia, Kenya, Somalia, Sudan, and Uganda. Its natural habitats are dry savanna and subtropical or tropical dry shrubland.

The brown-tailed rock chat was formerly included in the genus Cercomela. Molecular phylogenetic studies published in 2010 and 2012 found that the genus Cercomela was polyphyletic with five species, including the brown-tailed rock chat, phylogenetically nested within the genus Oenanthe. As part of a reorganization of the species to create monotypic genera, the brown-tailed rock chat was moved to the genus Oenanthe.

It is insectivorous.
