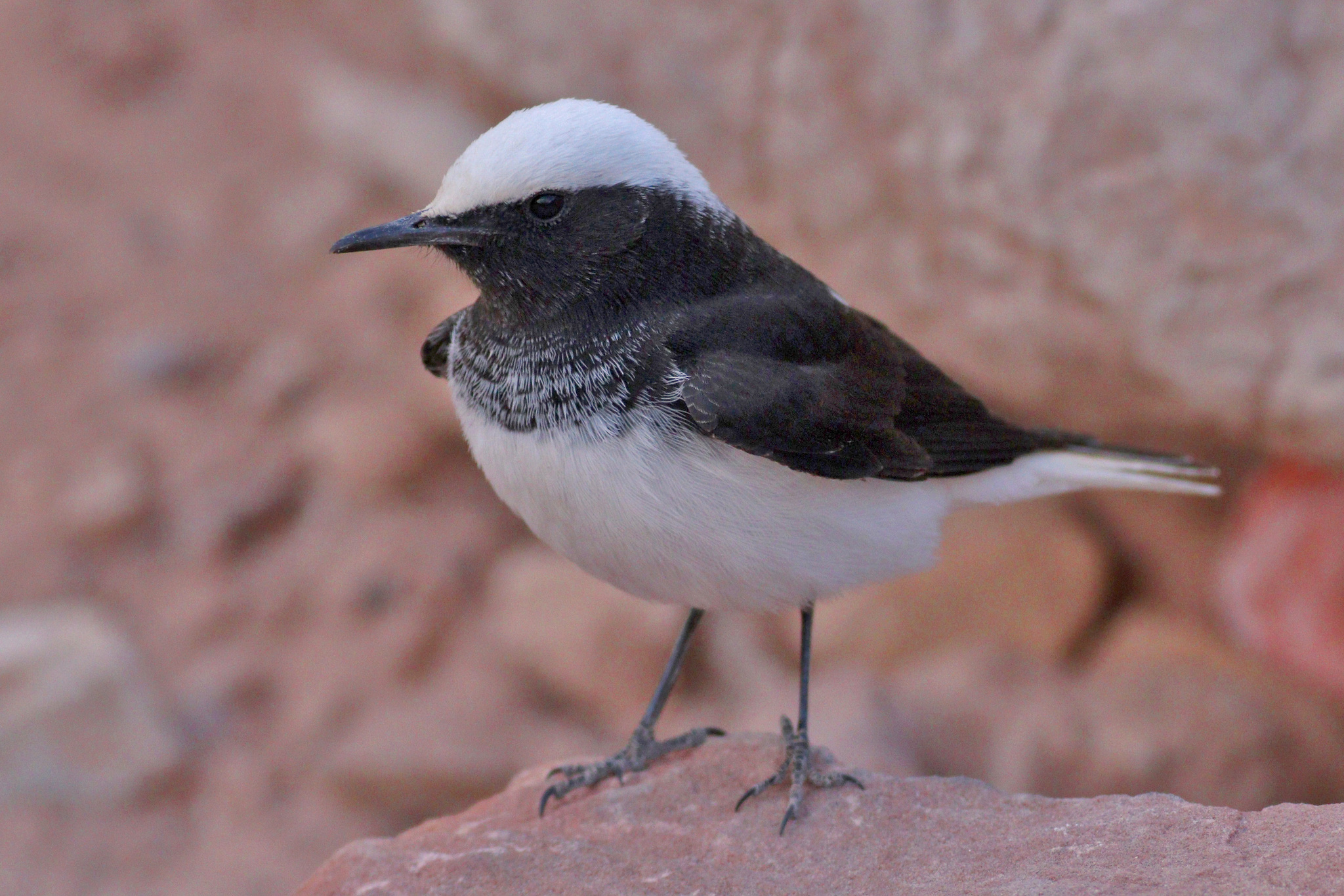
- Male, Amram's Pillars, Israel

Conservation status
- Least Concern (IUCN 3.1)

Scientific classification
- Kingdom: Animalia
- Phylum: Chordata
- Class: Aves
- Order: Passeriformes
- Family: Muscicapidae
- Genus: Oenanthe
- Species: O. monacha

Binomial name
- Oenanthe monacha (Temminck, 1825)

= Hooded wheatear =

Species of bird

The hooded wheatear (Oenanthe monacha) is a wheatear, a small insectivorous passerine that was formerly classed as a member of the thrush family Turdidae, but is now more generally considered to be an Old World flycatcher, Muscicapidae.

== Taxonomy and etymology ==
This species is placed in the genus Oenanthe that was introduced by the French ornithologist Louis Pierre Vieillot in 1816. The generic name, Oenanthe, is also the name of a plant genus, the water dropworts, and is derived from the Greek ainos "wine" and anthos "flower", from the wine-like scent of the flowers. In the case of the wheatear, it refers to the northern wheatears' return to Greece in the spring at the time that the grapevines blossom. The specific monacha is from late latin "monachus", monk; meaning hooded.

Its English name has nothing to do with wheat or with ear, but is an altered (perhaps bowdlerised) form of white-arse, which refers to its prominent white rump.

The hooded wheatear is a monotypic species.

== Description ==
This wheatear has a body length of 15.5–17 cm (6.1–6.7 in), a wingspan of 29–30 cm (11–12 in), and weighs 18–20 grams (0.63–0.71 oz). In summer the male is a white and black bird. The white crown and belly contrast with the black face, back and throat. The tail and rump are white with black central tail feathers.

The female is brown, becoming somewhat paler below. The tail pattern is similar to the male's, but the ground colour is buff rather than white.

== Ecology ==
The Hooded wheatear is a resident breeder in unvegetated desert from eastern Egypt through the Arabian Peninsula used to be in UAE and Oman a scarce breeder in Hajar mountains to Iran and Pakistan. It occurs annually in Cyprus on passage. The nest is built in a rock crevice, and 3-6 eggs is the normal clutch.

It feeds on insects, often taken in the air. Its call is a whistled vit, and the song is a harsh chattering.

== Status ==
The species is classified as "Least Concern" by the International Union for Conservation of Nature (IUCN) due to its wide distribution, stable population trends, and presumed large enough population size, although precise population estimates are lacking.

== Gallery ==
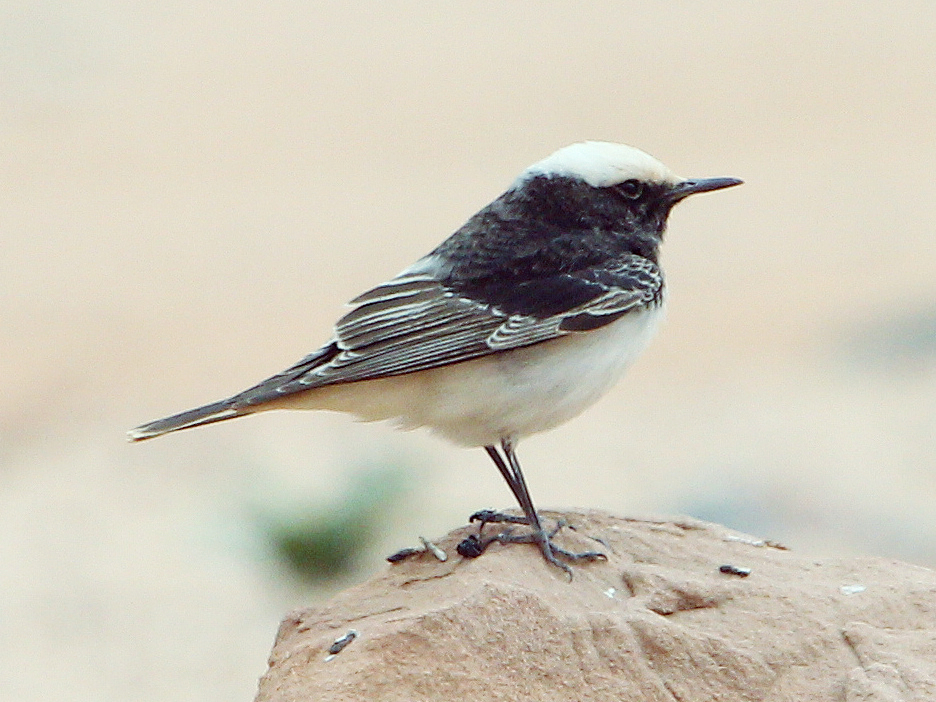
Hooded wheatear, Jordan
