= Sombre rock chat =

Conservation status
- Data Deficient (IUCN 3.1)

Scientific classification
- Kingdom: Animalia
- Phylum: Chordata
- Class: Aves
- Order: Passeriformes
- Family: Muscicapidae
- Genus: Oenanthe
- Species: O. dubia

Binomial name
- Oenanthe dubia (Blundell & Lovat, 1899)

Synonyms
- Cercomela dubia

Species of bird

The sombre rock chat (Oenanthe dubia) is a species of passerine bird in the family Muscicapidae. It is native to montane desert of central Ethiopia and possibly far-western Somalia. Its natural habitat is subtropical or tropical dry shrubland.

The sombre rock chat was formerly included in the genus Cercomela. Molecular phylogenetic studies published in 2010 and 2012 found that the genus Cercomela was polyphyletic with five species, including the sombre rock chat, phylogenetically nested within the genus Oenanthe. As part of a reorganization of the species to create monotypic genera, the sombre rock chat was moved to the genus Oenanthe.
