= Oenanthe kormosi =

Oenanthe kormosi Temporal range: Late Miocene

Scientific classification
- Kingdom: Animalia
- Phylum: Chordata
- Class: Aves
- Order: Passeriformes
- Family: Muscicapidae
- Genus: Oenanthe
- Species: †O. kormosi

Binomial name
- †Oenanthe kormosi Kessler, 2013

Extinct species of bird

Oenanthe kormosi is an extinct species of Oenanthe that inhabited Hungary during the Neogene period.

== Etymology ==
The specific epithet is a tribute to Hungarian paleontologist Tivadar Kormos (1881–1946).
