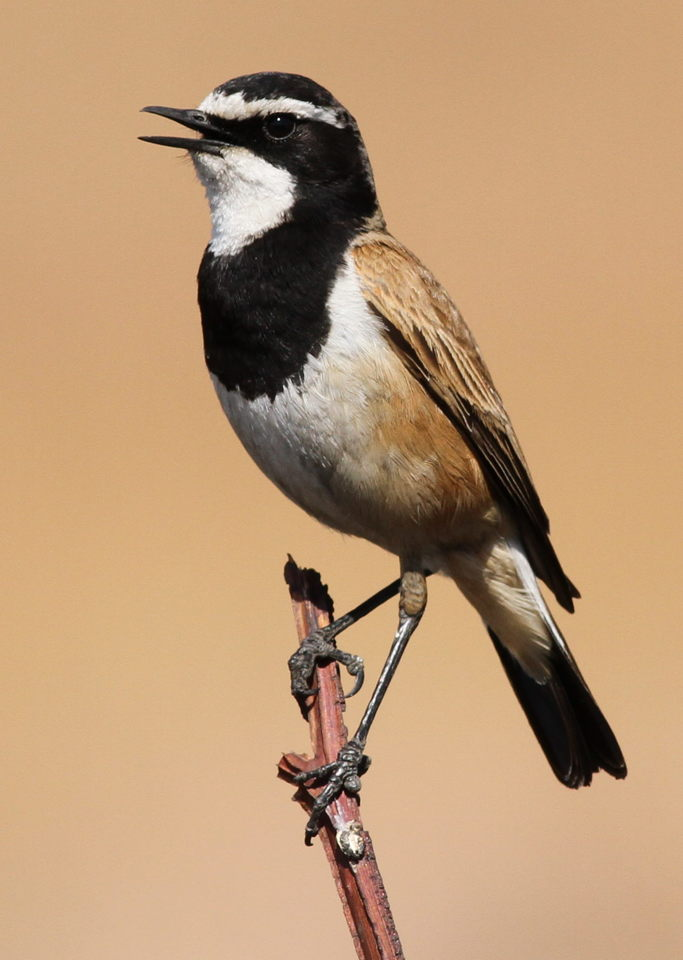

Conservation status
- Least Concern (IUCN 3.1)

Scientific classification
- Kingdom: Animalia
- Phylum: Chordata
- Class: Aves
- Order: Passeriformes
- Family: Muscicapidae
- Genus: Oenanthe
- Species: O. pileata

Binomial name
- Oenanthe pileata (Gmelin, JF, 1789)

= Capped wheatear =

Species of bird

The capped wheatear (Oenanthe pileata) is a small insectivorous passerine bird that is widely distributed over southern Africa. It was formerly classed as a member of the thrush family Turdidae, but is now placed in the Old World flycatcher family, Muscicapidae.

== Taxonomy ==
The capped wheatear was formally described in 1789 by the German naturalist Johann Friedrich Gmelin in his revised and expanded edition of Carl Linnaeus's Systema Naturae. He placed it with the wagtails in the genus Motacilla and coined the binomial name Motacilla pileata. The specific epithet is from Latin pileatus meaning "-capped". Gmelin based his account on the "Black-hooded wheat-ear" that had been described in 1783 by the English ornithologist John Latham in his multi-volume work A General Synopsis of Birds. Latham's specimen had been collected near the Cape of Good Hope in South Africa. The capped wheatear is now placed in the genus Oenanthe that was introduced in 1816 by the French ornithologist Louis Pierre Vieillot.

Three subspecies are recognised:

- O. p. neseri Macdonald, 1952 – south Angola, Namibia, west Botswana and northwest South Africa
- O. p. livingstonii (Tristram, 1868) – central Kenya to northeast South Africa and east Botswana
- O. p. pileata (Gmelin, JF, 1789) – southwest Namibia and South Africa except northwest, northeast

== Description ==
The capped wheatear is 17–18 cm long and weighs 32 g. Its legs and pointed bill are black. This common species is striking and unmistakable in appearance. The adult has a black cap, cheeks and breast band, and white eye stripe and throat. The rest of the underparts are white with buff on the flanks and lower belly. Like other wheatears, it has a distinctive tail pattern with a black feathers on the base and centre of the tail forming an inverted T against the otherwise white rump. The juvenile has a brown cap and cheeks, and the breast band is weak and diffuse. However, the breast band, larger size, and white at the base of the outer tail feathers distinguish it from the migrant northern wheatear, which is rare over most of the capped wheatear's range.

== Distribution and habitat ==
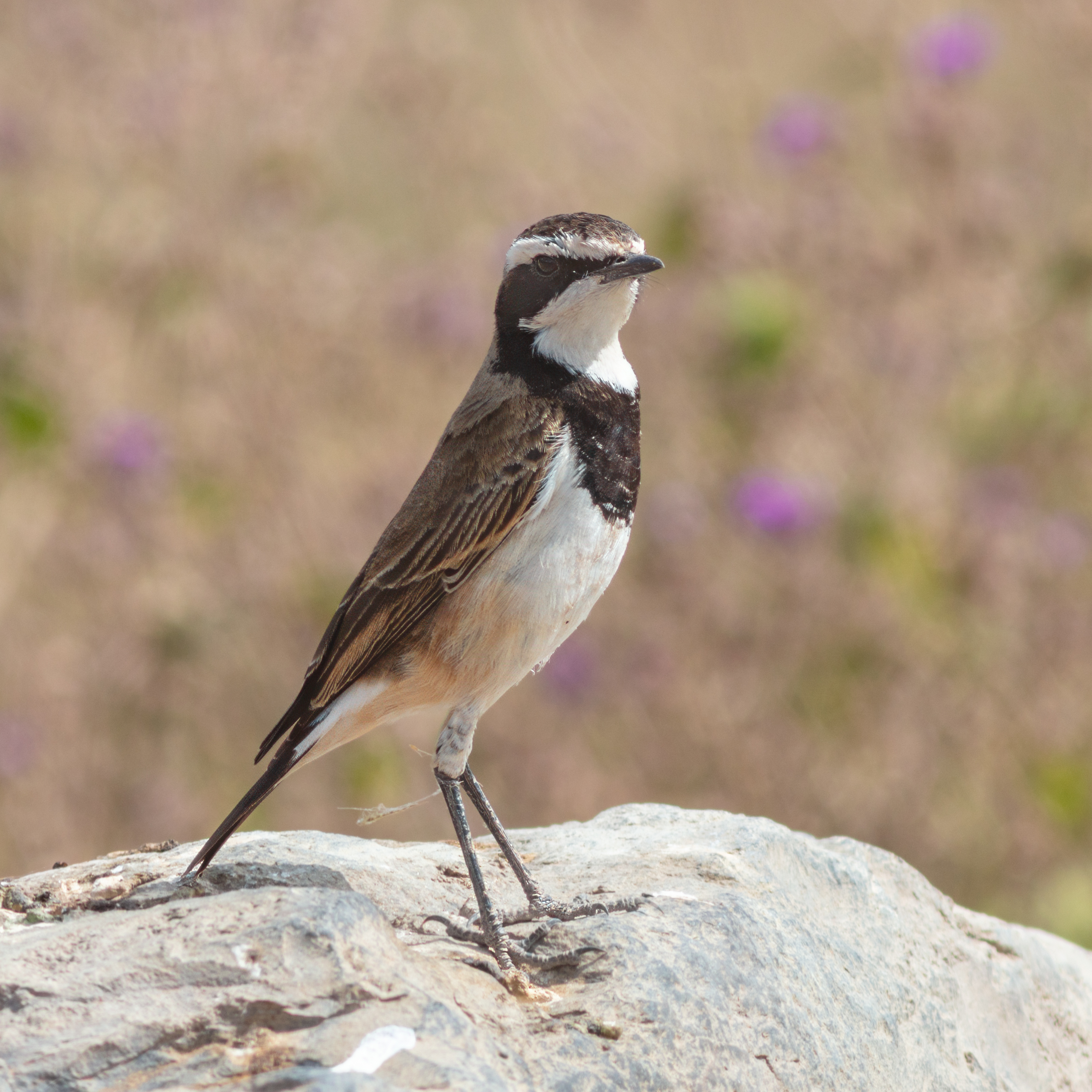
Exemplar in Ngorongoro, Tanzania

This wheatear is found in open dry sandy and stony habitats and short grassland with a few bushes and termite mounds in Africa, from Kenya and Angola south to the Cape. It is largely non-migratory, but undertakes seasonal movements.

== Behaviour ==
The capped wheatear's song is a loud melodic warble interspersed with slurred chattering, and it has a chik-chik alarm call. It is monogamous and builds a nest of straw, grass, and leaves in a hole in the ground or a termite mound. It may use man-made drainage pipes if available. Typically three or four, sometimes more, eggs are laid. This solitary species feeds on insects, especially ants. Like other wheatears, it perches on mounds and hops over the short grass, or flies low over the ground.
