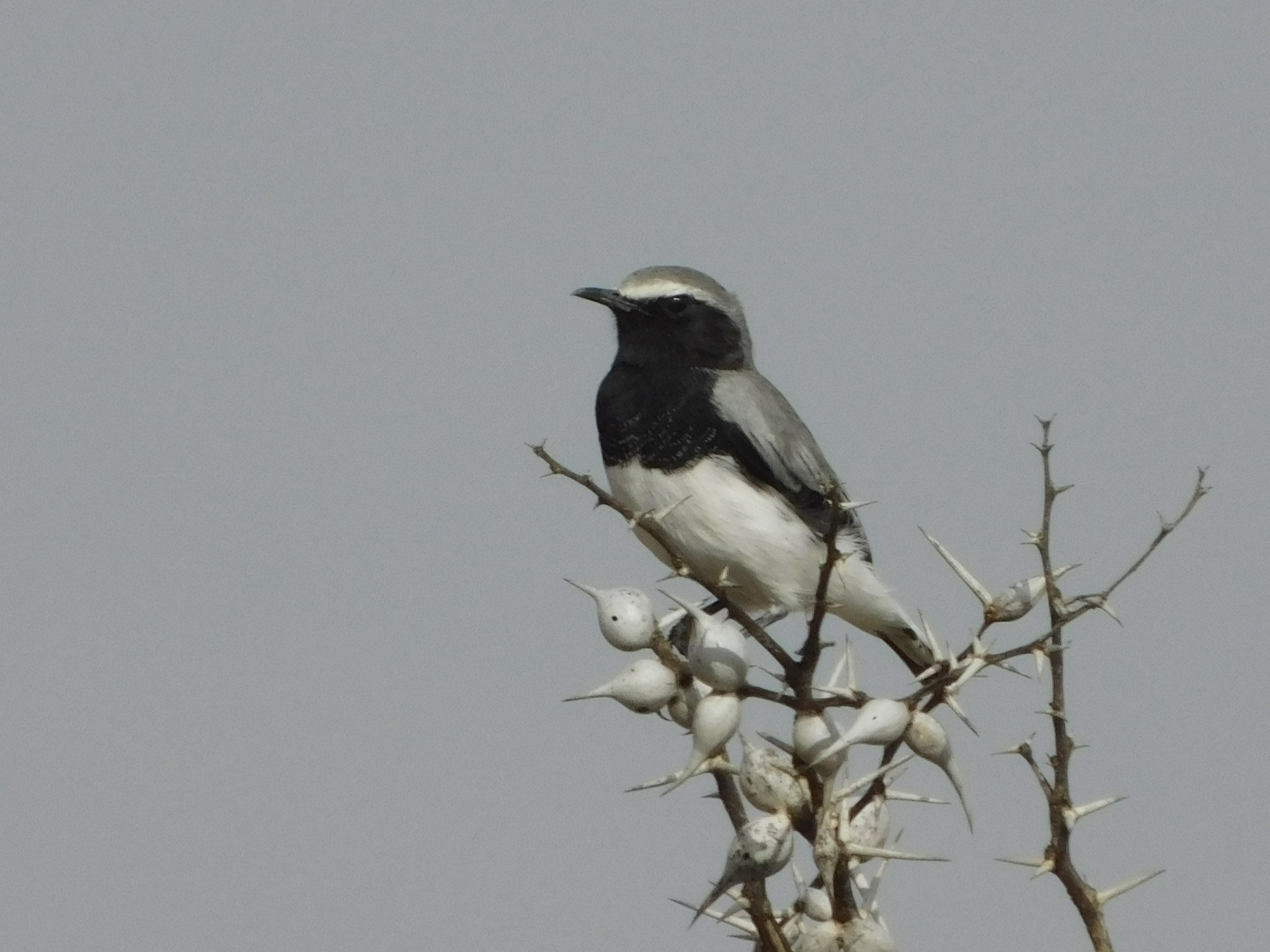

Conservation status
- Least Concern (IUCN 3.1)

Scientific classification
- Kingdom: Animalia
- Phylum: Chordata
- Class: Aves
- Order: Passeriformes
- Family: Muscicapidae
- Genus: Oenanthe
- Species: O. phillipsi

Binomial name
- Oenanthe phillipsi (Shelley, 1885)

= Somali wheatear =

Species of bird

The Somali wheatear (Oenanthe phillipsi) is a species of bird in the family Muscicapidae. It is found in northeast Ethiopia and northeast Somalia.

Its natural habitats are subtropical or tropical dry shrubland and subtropical or tropical dry lowland grassland.
