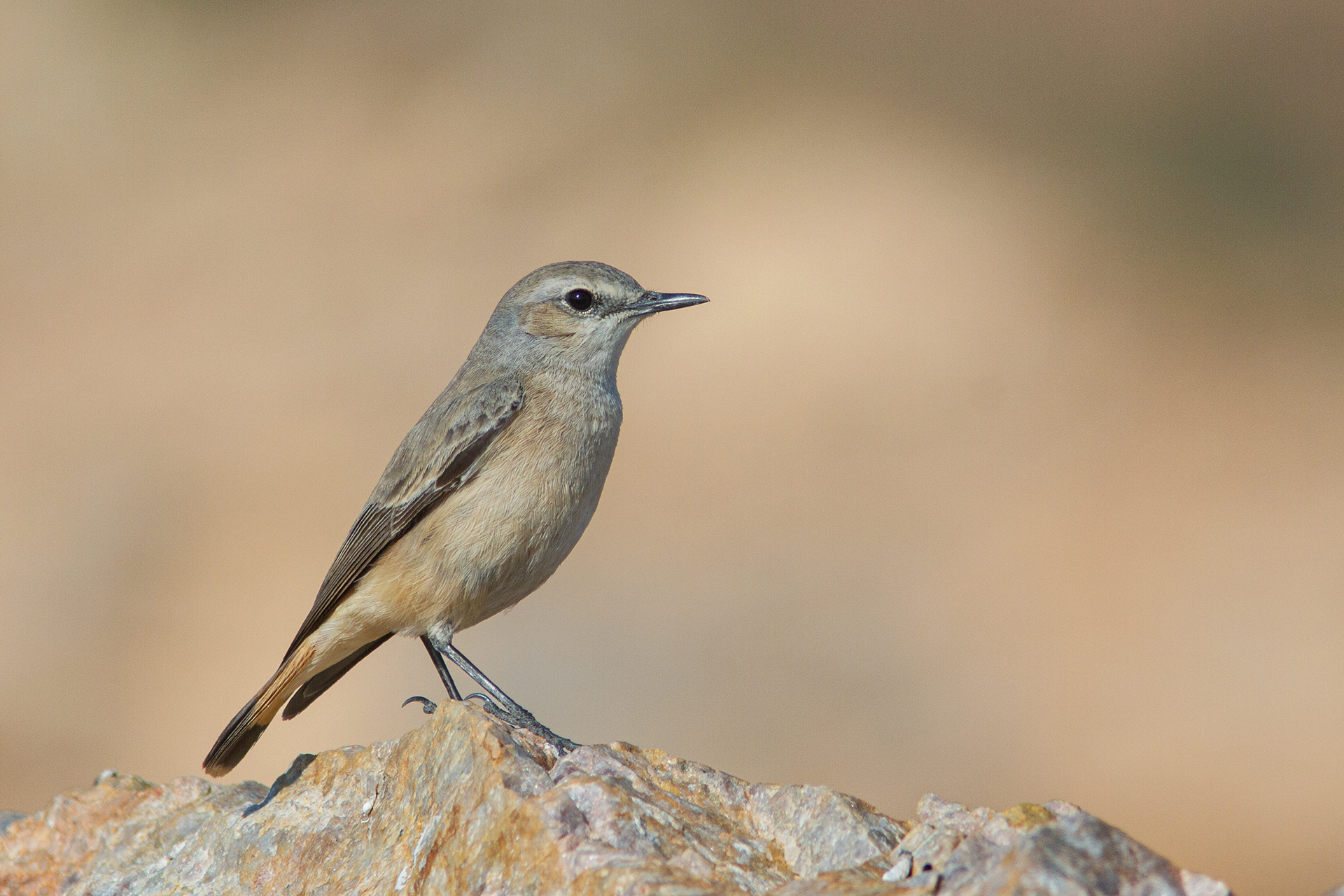

Conservation status
- Least Concern (IUCN 3.1)

Scientific classification
- Kingdom: Animalia
- Phylum: Chordata
- Class: Aves
- Order: Passeriformes
- Family: Muscicapidae
- Genus: Oenanthe
- Species: O. chrysopygia

Binomial name
- Oenanthe chrysopygia (De Filippi, 1863)

Synonyms
- Oenanthe xanthoprymna chrysopygia

= Red-tailed wheatear =

Species of bird

The red-tailed wheatear (Oenanthe chrysopygia), also known as the rusty-tailed wheatear, Persian wheatear or Afghan wheatear, is a small passerine bird breeding in mountainous areas of south-west and central Asia. It belongs to the wheatear genus Oenanthe which was formerly placed in the thrush family Turdidae but is now in the Old World flycatcher family Muscicapidae. The red-tailed wheatear used to be considered a subspecies of the Kurdish wheatear (O. xanthoprymna) but is now often regarded as a separate species.

== Description ==
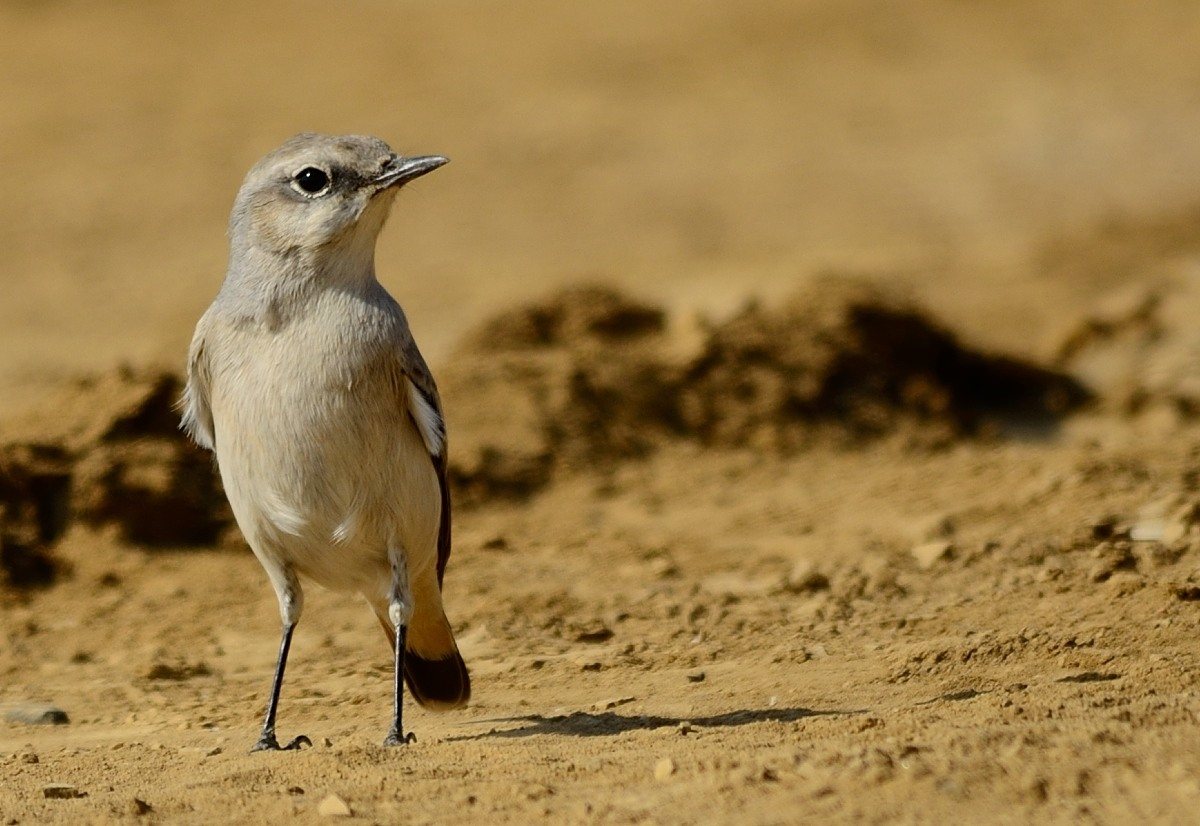
From Rajasthan

It is 14.5 cm long with a wingspan of 26–27 cm and a weight of about 20-27 g. The plumage is fairly drab, mainly grey-brown above and greyish-white below. It has a faint pale stripe over the eye, a rufous tinge to the ear-coverts and silvery-white underwing-coverts. The rump and bases of the outer tail-feathers are reddish while the rest of the tail is black forming a T-shaped pattern. There is little difference between males and females but the male has black between the eye and bill.

The female Kurdistan wheatear can be very similar but usually has white bases to the outer tail-feathers. Adult males and some females of the Kurdistan wheatear are quite different with a black face and throat and greyer upperparts.

The song is a simple repeated whistle. The bird has several clicking, rasping and whistling calls.

== Taxonomy ==
The species was described in 1863 by the Italian zoologist Filippo de Filippi who named it Dromolaea chrysopgyia. It was later treated as a subspecies of the Kurdish wheatear (O. xanthoprymna) after birds with an appearance intermediate between the two ("O. x. cummingi") were found, suggesting that they could interbreed. However, these hybrid birds may in fact be first-winter Kurdish wheatears.

Red-tailed wheatears in the eastern part of the range are slightly paler and are sometimes regarded as a separate subspecies, O. c. kingi.

== Distribution and habitat ==
Its breeding range extends from north-east Turkey, Armenia and Azerbaijan eastwards through Iran to Afghanistan, southern Tajikistan and western Pakistan. It migrates south to winter in the Arabian Peninsula, Eritrea, southern parts of Iraq and Iran, Pakistan and north-west India. It has occurred as a vagrant in Israel, Ethiopia, Djibouti and Nepal.

It breeds in mountainous areas from 1,200—4,000 m above sea-level. It nests on steep, barren, rocky ground with little vegetation. It winters at lower levels occurring on rocky hills, steppe, scrubland and semi-desert.

== Behaviour ==
It usually forages on bare ground, feeding mainly on insects such as ants, beetles, and caterpillars. It will pick food from vegetation, dig with its bill for beetle larvae and launch attacks from an exposed perch on a rock or stone.

It breeds from late March or April to June, raising two broods. The nest is a cup of grass and other plant material built in a hole in rocks, stones or a wall. Four to six eggs are laid and are incubated for 13 days. The eggs are pale bluish-white, sometimes with reddish-brown spots.
