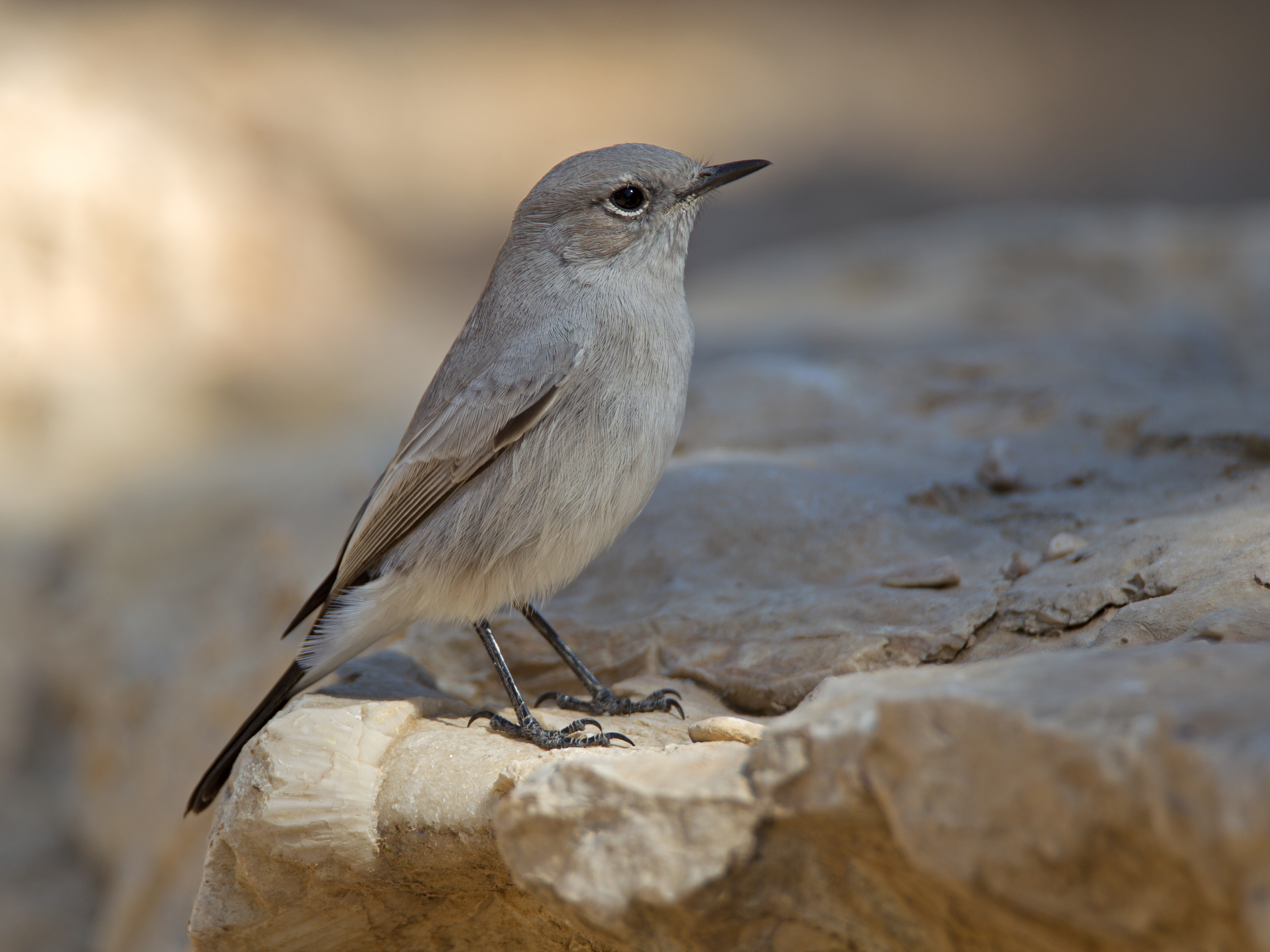

Conservation status
- Least Concern (IUCN 3.1)

Scientific classification
- Kingdom: Animalia
- Phylum: Chordata
- Class: Aves
- Order: Passeriformes
- Family: Muscicapidae
- Genus: Oenanthe
- Species: O. melanura

Binomial name
- Oenanthe melanura (Temminck, 1824)

Synonyms
- Cercomela melanura (Temminck, 1824); Saxicola melanura Temminck, 1824

= Blackstart =

Species of bird

The blackstart (Oenanthe melanura) is a chat found in desert regions in North Africa, the Middle East and the Arabian Peninsula. It is resident throughout its range.

The blackstart is 14 cm (5.5 in) long and is named for its black tail, which is frequently fanned; the rest of its plumage is bluish-grey or grey-brown (North African races being browner, Middle Eastern races bluer). The sexes are similar. The song is a clear melancholy whistle: CHURlee...TRUloo...CHURlee...TRUlur..., with short phrases from the song used as a call.

The habitats of blackstarts are rocky deserts and mountain slopes; they nest in rock crevices lay 3–4 eggs. They feed on insects, taken mainly on the ground. The blackstart is a confident species, unafraid of people.

== Taxonomy ==
The first formal description of the blackstart was by the Dutch zoologist Coenraad Jacob Temminck in 1824 under the binomial name Saxicola melanura. The blackstart was included as the type species in the genus Cercomela introduced by Charles Lucien Bonaparte in 1856. Molecular phylogenetic studies published in 2010 and 2012 found that the genus Cercomela was polyphyletic with five species, including the blackstart, phylogenetically nested within the genus Oenanthe. As part of a reorganization of the species to create monotypic genera, the blackstart was assigned to the genus Oenanthe. The specific epithet melanura is from the classical Greek melanouros meaning "with a black tail" from melas "black" and oura "tail".

Six subspecies are recognised:

- O. m. melanura (Temminck, 1824) – northeast Egypt to Israel, Jordan and central Saudi Arabia
- O. m. neumanni (Ripley, 1952) – southwest Saudi Arabia, Yemen and Oman
- O. m. lypura (Hemprich & Ehrenberg, 1833) – north-central Sudan to Eritrea
- O. m. aussae (Thesiger & Meynell, 1934) – northeast Ethiopia, Djibouti and north Somalia
- O. m. airensis (Hartert, 1921) – north Niger to central Sudan
- O. m. ultima (Bates, 1933) – east Mali and west Niger

The subspecies differ slightly in the colour of their plumage.

== Description ==
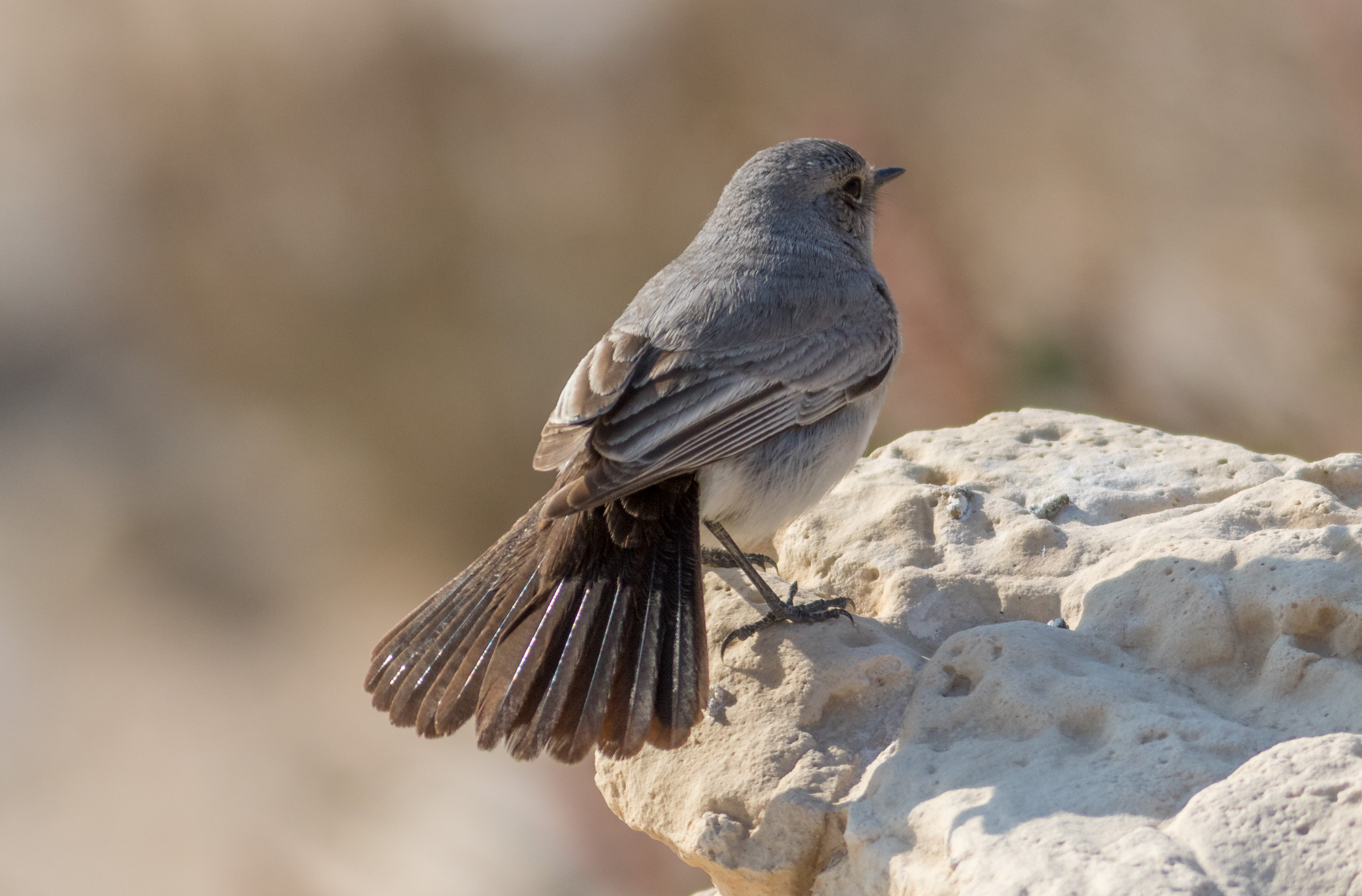
Repeated tail spreading is a characteristic behavior. Sde Boker, Israel

The blackstart is around 14 cm (5.5 in) in length with a wingspan of 23–27 cm (9.1–10.6 in) and a weight of around 15 g (0.53 oz). The nominate race O. m. melanura has blueish ash-grey upperparts with darker wings and a black rump and tail. The belly and under-wings are greyish white; the bill and legs are black. The sexes are similar. The North African subspecies O. m. lypura and O. m. airensis are browner than the nominate.

== Distribution and habitat ==
- In Egypt, the blackstart is common in the Sinai Peninsula
- In Israel the species is primarily found in the Negev Desert, Arava Valley and Dead Sea areas; it is present in areas of the Jordan River valley further north, but is scarcer there.
- In Jordan, the species is only found in western parts of the country, in areas from the Jordan River valley south through the Dead Sea region to the Arava Valley and Aqaba Mountains.

== Breeding ==
The blackstart is monogamous and pairs remain on their breeding territory throughout the year. The nest is built entirely by the female and can be placed between boulders, in a rock crevice or in a disused burrow. (Note: Clement 2016 reports that both sexes take part in building the nest.) The nest is a shallow cup of grass and leaves lined with hair and fine plant material. The female usually places small pebbles around the entrance of the nest. The 3 or 4 pale blue eggs with fine red-brown speckles are laid at daily intervals. They measure 19.6 mm × 14.7 mm (0.77 in × 0.58 in) and weigh 2.26 g (0.080 oz). They are incubated by the female and hatch after 13–14 days. The chicks are fed by both parents and fledge after around 14 days. Up to three broods can be raised in a year.

A study conducted in Israel on the west shore of the Dead Sea found that a major cause of nest failure was the predation of the eggs by Golden and Cairo spiny mice.

== Status ==
The species has a wide distribution range, stable population trends, and is presumed to have a large population, although precise estimates have not been conducted. As a result, it is classified as "Least Concern" by the International Union for Conservation of Nature (IUCN).
