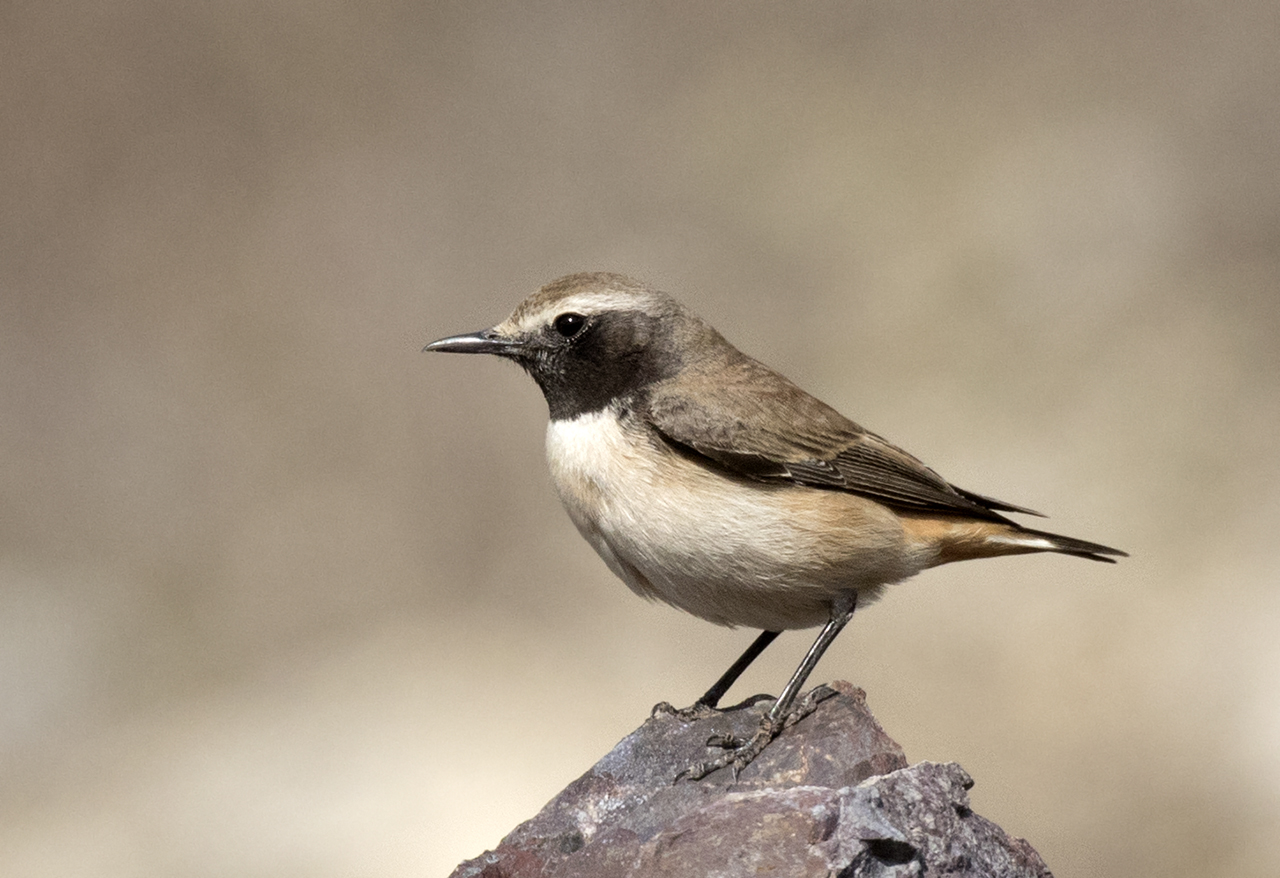

Conservation status
- Least Concern (IUCN 3.1)

Scientific classification
- Kingdom: Animalia
- Phylum: Chordata
- Class: Aves
- Order: Passeriformes
- Family: Muscicapidae
- Genus: Oenanthe
- Species: O. xanthoprymna

Binomial name
- Oenanthe xanthoprymna (Hemprich & Ehrenberg, 1833)

= Kurdish wheatear =

Species of bird

The Kurdish wheatear (Oenanthe xanthoprymna), also known as the Kurdistan wheatear, the chestnut-rumped wheatear or the red-rumped wheatear, is a species of bird in the family Muscicapidae. The red-tailed wheatear (O. chrysopygia) was formerly considered a subspecies of this bird but is now often regarded as a separate species. The two may intergrade in Iran ("O. x. cummingi") but it is also possible that the rather differently coloured cummingi is in fact a one-year-old O. xanthoprymna with intermediate plumage.

== Description ==
The Kurdish wheatear is about 14 centimetres (5.5 in) in length. The top of the head and the nape of the male are pale grey, separated by a white eye stripe from the black face and throat. The back is brownish grey and the underparts white or buff. The wings are charcoal with no white streak, the flight feathers being edged with brown. The flanks and under-tail coverts are orange and the tail white at the base with a dark terminal band. The female has similar markings but the colours are more muted and the dark face and throat replaced by a grey eye patch. The orange rump and tail coverts are particularly noticeable in the winter when the male is in flight.

== Call ==
The call note is a harsh chack-chack-chack. The song is similar to that of the northern wheatear (Oenanthe oenanthe) and is a rather squeaky warble.

== Diet ==
The Kurdish wheatear mainly eats ants and other small insects.

== Reproduction ==
The nest is built among rocks, in a crevice, in scree or under a boulder. It is basin-shaped and lined with wool, hair and dead grasses. Four or five eggs are laid. They are bluish-white with a few chestnut brown speckles.

== Distribution and habitat ==
The breeding range of the Kurdish wheatear covers the Middle East, south-east Turkey, northern Iraq, western Iran, and parts of the former USSR. It moves southwards in winter to southern Iran, the Arabian Peninsula, Egypt, Sudan, Eritrea and north-east Somalia and occasionally to north west India. It is unclear whether all populations migrate or whether some birds just move down to lower altitudes for the winter. Its preferred habitat is heathland, open hillsides and scrubby, semi-desert regions. It is listed as being of "least concern" in the IUCN Red List of Threatened Species because of its very large range.
