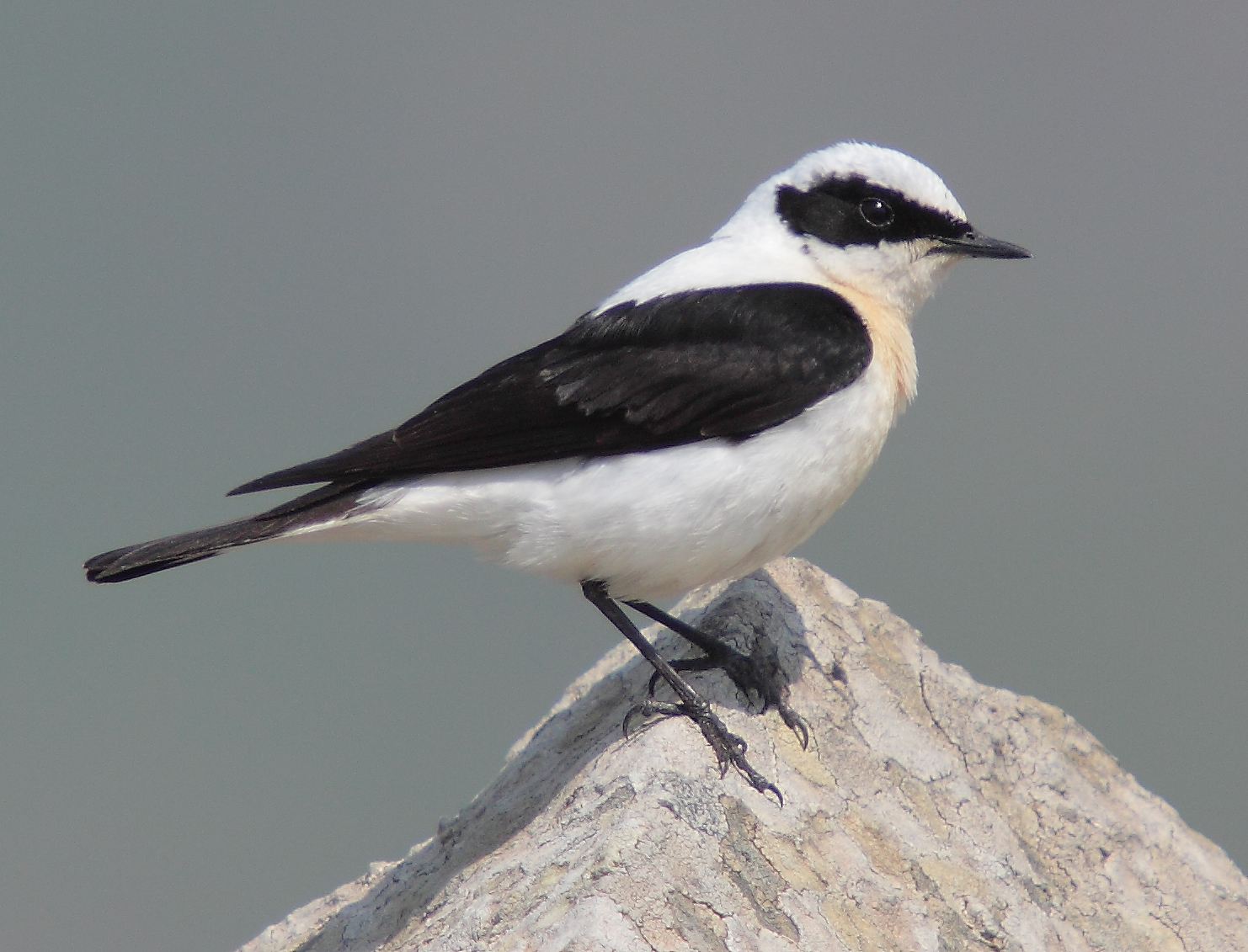
- Adult male
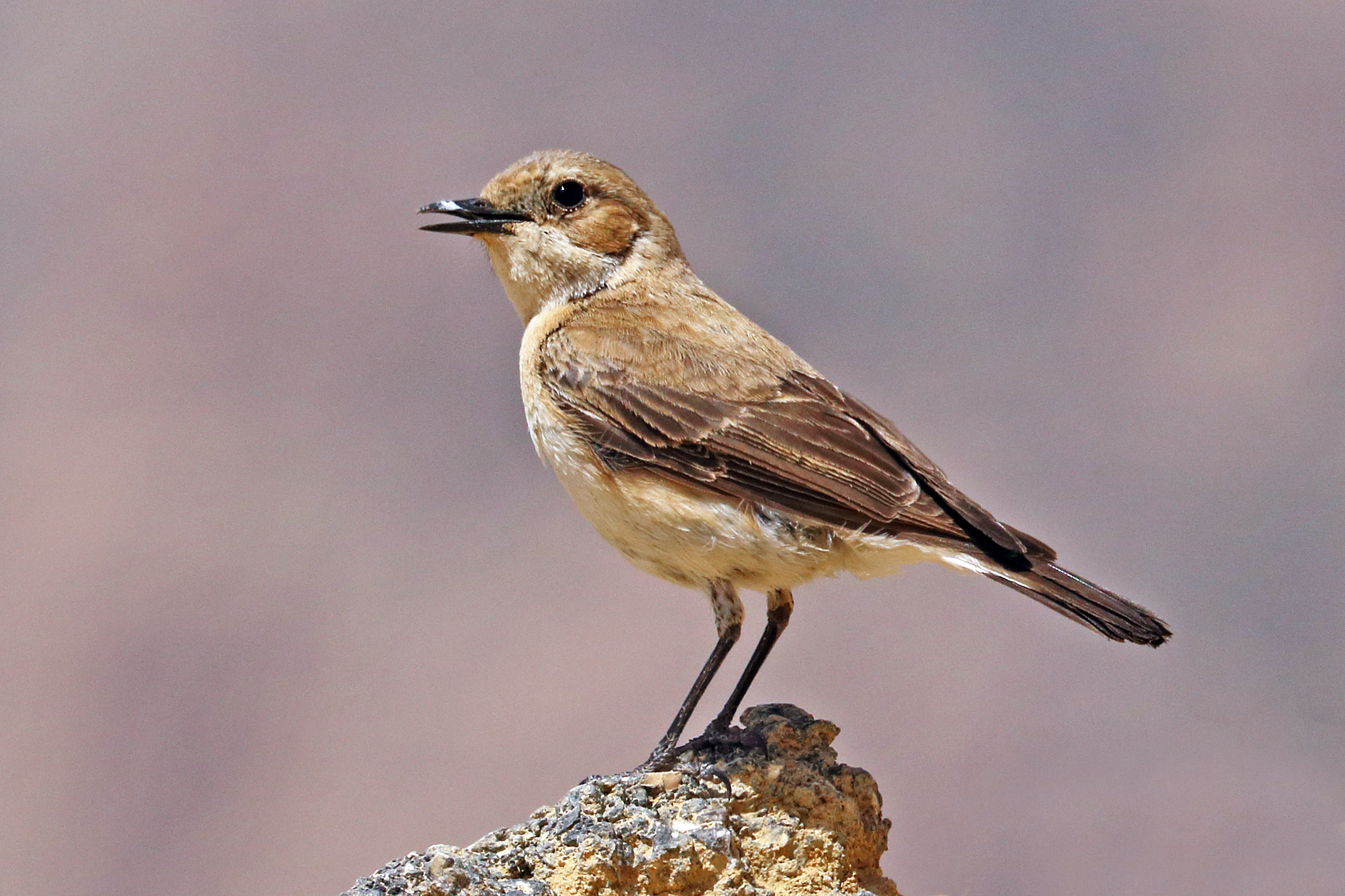
- Female

Scientific classification
- Kingdom: Animalia
- Phylum: Chordata
- Class: Aves
- Order: Passeriformes
- Family: Muscicapidae
- Genus: Oenanthe
- Species: O. melanoleuca

Binomial name
- Oenanthe melanoleuca (Güldenstädt, 1775)

Synonyms
- Oenanthe hispanica melanoleuca

= Eastern black-eared wheatear =

Species of bird

The eastern black-eared wheatear (Oenanthe melanoleuca) is a wheatear, a small migratory passerine bird that was formerly classed as a member of the thrush family Turdidae, but is now considered to be an Old World flycatcher (family Muscicapidae). It was formerly (and still is by some authorities) considered conspecific with the western black-eared wheatear.

== Description ==
The breeding male has the forehead, crown, and mantle white or nearly white with a buff tinge, and the wings blacker than those of the northern wheatear. The underparts are white tinged with buff. The back, upper tail coverts and most of the tail are white. A black mask extends from the ear coverts to the bill. The throat can be either black or white.

In autumn and winter the head and mantle are distinctly buff, as are the underparts (including the throat on non-black-throated individuals), but the buff varies in intensity. Except for the central pair, the tail feathers are much whiter than in the northern wheatear, the white on the inner web often extending to the tip.

The female is a more gray-brown bird, but has the characteristic white lower back, and her seasonal changes are less marked.

=== Differences from western black-eared wheatear ===
The male eastern black-eared wheatear can be distinguished from the male western black-eared wheatear by its whiter, less buff-tinted upperparts than the latter species, giving it a more distinctly black-and-white appearance, as well as by having the black of the mask reaching just above the base of the bill. Black-throated individuals of this species have a greater amount of black on the throat and face than on the western birds, and the black generally terminates more abruptly or in a straighter line. Females of this species differ from their western counterparts in being overall colder-colored and duller.

== Ecology ==
It is found breeding in the eastern Mediterranean, Southeast Europe to the Caspian Sea and Iran and migrates to winter quarters in the Sudan. Prefers open habitats with scattered trees, such as savanna, rocky slopes, and barren pastures.
