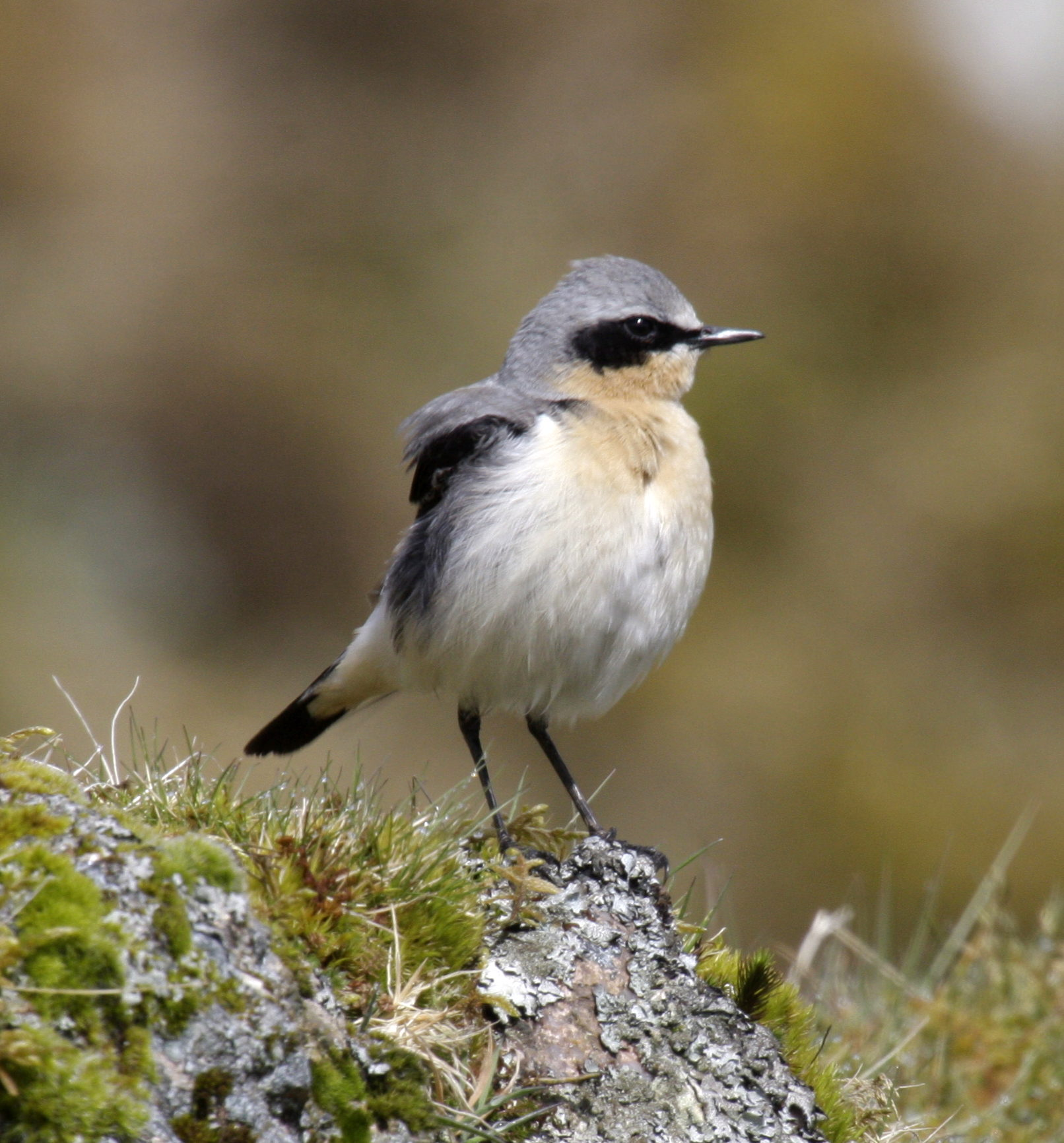
- Male northern wheatear (Oenanthe oenanthe)

Scientific classification
- Kingdom: Animalia
- Phylum: Chordata
- Class: Aves
- Order: Passeriformes
- Family: Muscicapidae
- Subfamily: Saxicolinae
- Genus: Oenanthe; Vieillot, 1816

Type species
- Motacilla oenanthe Linnaeus, 1758

Species
- See text

Synonyms
- Cercomela

= Wheatear =

Wheatears

Genus of birds

The wheatears are passerine birds of the genus Oenanthe. They were formerly considered to be members of the thrush family, Turdidae, but are now more commonly placed in the flycatcher family, Muscicapidae. This is an Old World group, but the northern wheatear has established a foothold in eastern Canada and Greenland and in western Canada and Alaska.

== Taxonomy ==
The genus Oenanthe was introduced by the French ornithologist Louis Pierre Vieillot in 1816 with Oenanthe leucura, the black wheatear, as the type species. The genus formerly included fewer species but molecular phylogenetic studies of birds in the Old World flycatcher family Muscicapidae found that the genus Cercomela was polyphyletic with five species, including the type species C. melanura, phylogenetically nested within the genus Oenanthe. This implied that Cercomela and Oenanthe were synonyms. The genus Oenanthe (Vieillot, 1816) has taxonomic priority over Cercomela (Bonaparte, 1856) making Cercomela a junior synonym. The genus name Oenanthe was used by Aristotle for an unidentified bird. The word is derived from the Greek oenoē meaning "vine" and anthos meaning "bloom". The bird was associated with the grape harvest season.

The name "wheatear" is not derived from "wheat" or any sense of "ear", but is a folk etymology of "white" and "arse", referring to the prominent white rump found in the northern wheatear, the first species so named.

== Description ==
Most species have characteristic black and white or red and white markings on their rumps or their long tails. Most species are strongly sexually dimorphic; only the male has the striking plumage patterns characteristic of the genus, though the females share the white or red rump patches.

== Species list ==
The genus contains 31 species:

Image	Common name	Scientific name	Distribution
	Northern wheatear	Oenanthe oenanthe	Holarctic; winters to Sub-Saharan Africa
	Atlas wheatear	Oenanthe seebohmi	Maghreb; winters in western Sahel
	Capped wheatear	Oenanthe pileata	southern Sub-Saharan Africa
	Buff-breasted wheatear	Oenanthe bottae	Asir Mountains
	Rusty-breasted wheatear	Oenanthe frenata	Ethiopian Highlands
	Isabelline wheatear	Oenanthe isabellina	central-southern Eurasia; winters to Sub-Saharan, Africa, Middle east and South Asia
-	Heuglin's wheatear	Oenanthe heuglinii	northern Sub-Saharan Africa
	Hooded wheatear	Oenanthe monacha	Middle-East
	Desert wheatear	Oenanthe deserti	Maghreb and central Asia; winters to North Africa, Middle East and South Asia
	Western black-eared wheatear	Oenanthe hispanica	western Mediterranean; winters to western Sahel
	Pied wheatear	Oenanthe pleschanka	central Asia; winters to East Africa
	Eastern black-eared wheatear	Oenanthe melanoleuca	eastern Mediterranean; winters to eastern Sahel
	Cyprus wheatear	Oenanthe cypriaca	Cyprus
	White-fronted black chat	Oenanthe albifrons	Sudan (region)
	Somali wheatear	Oenanthe phillipsi	Horn of Africa
	Red-rumped wheatear	Oenanthe moesta	Morocco to Jordan; partly winters to eastern Saudi Arabia
	Blackstart	Oenanthe melanura	Sahel and Red Sea region
	Familiar chat	Oenanthe familiaris	Sub-Saharan Africa
	Brown-tailed rock chat	Oenanthe scotocerca	Chad, western Sudan and Horn of Africa
-	Sombre rock chat	Oenanthe dubia	montane desert of central Ethiopia
	Brown rock chat	Oenanthe fusca	northern South Asia
	Variable wheatear	Oenanthe picata	from eastern Iran and southern Kazakhstan to Indus River ; winters to UAE and northwestern India
	Finsch's wheatear	Oenanthe finschii	Anatolia to western Central Asia; winters to Cyprus, Saudi Arabia and Pakistan
	Mourning wheatear	Oenanthe lugens	Middle East
	Kurdish wheatear	Oenanthe xanthoprymna	Kurdistan; winters to Red Sea and southern Arabian Peninsula
	Red-tailed wheatear	Oenanthe chrysopygia	Iran and Pakistan; winters to Arabian peninsula and northwestern South Asia
	White-crowned wheatear	Oenanthe leucopyga	North Africa and Middle East
	Hume's wheatear	Oenanthe albonigra	Iran, eastern Oman to Indus valley
	Black wheatear	Oenanthe leucura	Iberian Peninsula to western Libya and Mauritania
	Arabian wheatear	Oenanthe lugentoides	Arabian Peninsula
	Abyssinian wheatear	Oenanthe lugubris	montane East Africa

== Behaviour ==
Wheatears are terrestrial insectivorous birds of open, often dry, country. They often nest in rock crevices or disused burrows. Northern species are long-distance migrants, wintering in Africa.

== Fossil record ==
- Oenanthe kormosi (Late Miocene of Polgardi, Hungary)
- Oenanthe pongraczi (Pliocene of Csarnota, Hungary)
