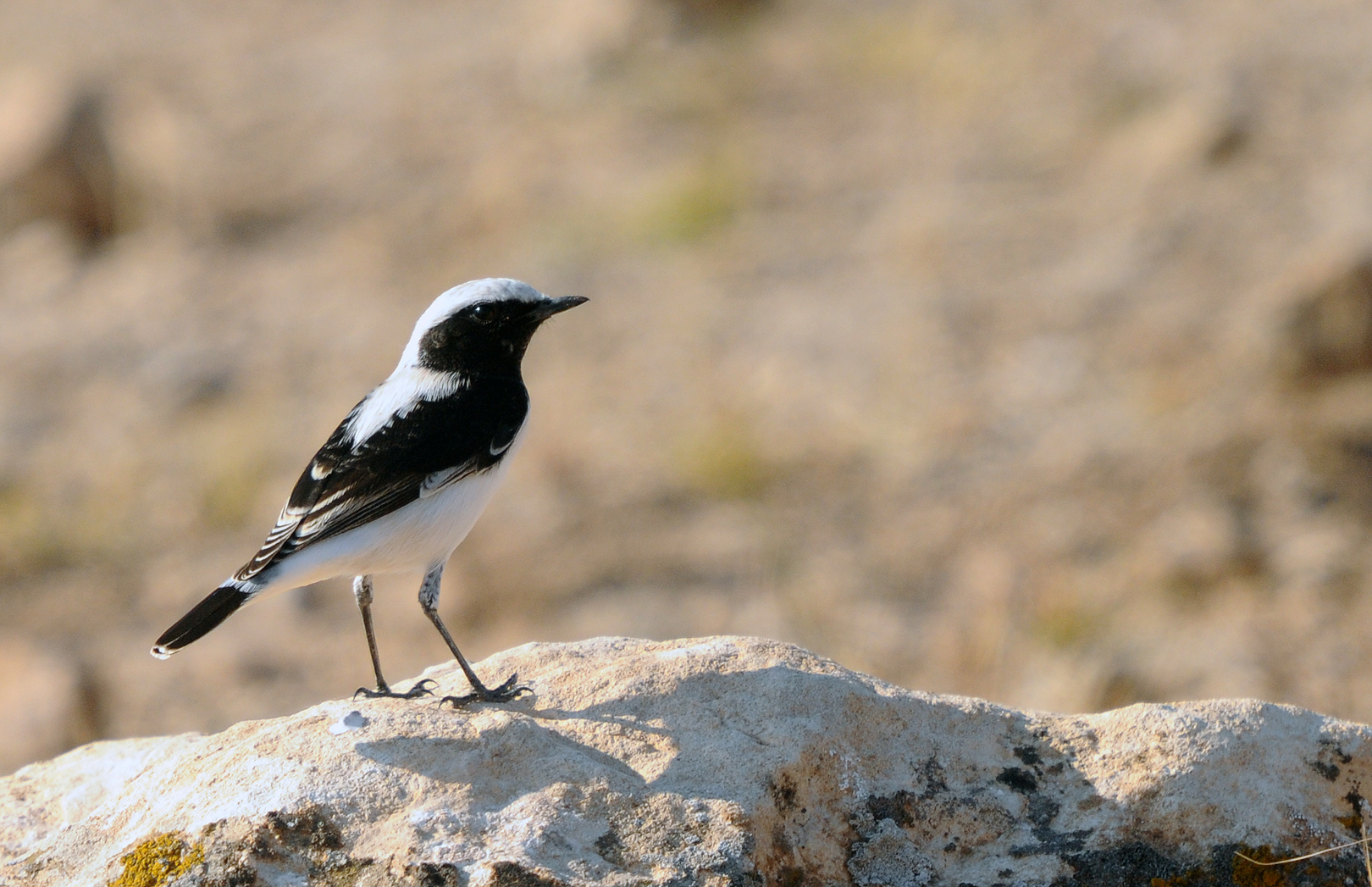

Conservation status
- Least Concern (IUCN 3.1)

Scientific classification
- Kingdom: Animalia
- Phylum: Chordata
- Class: Aves
- Order: Passeriformes
- Family: Muscicapidae
- Genus: Oenanthe
- Species: O. finschii

Binomial name
- Oenanthe finschii (Heuglin, 1869)

= Finsch's wheatear =

Species of bird

Finsch's wheatear (Oenanthe finschii) is a wheatear, a small insectivorous passerine that was formerly classed as a member of the thrush family, Turdidae, but is now more generally considered to be an Old World flycatcher of the family Muscicapidae.

== Taxonomy and etymology ==
The common name and scientific name commemorate the German ethnographer, naturalist, and colonial explorer Friedrich Hermann Otto Finsch (8 August 1839 – 31 January 1917, Braunschweig).

=== Subspecies ===
There are two recognized subspecies:

- O. f. finschii (Oates, 1890) – The nominate subspecies. Summers and breeds from southern Turkey south to northern Israel, and east to western Iran; winters in Cyprus and Egypt.
- O. f. barnesi (Hoeglin, 1869) – Summers and breeds from eastern Turkey to eastern and central Iran, southern Kazakhstan, and western Pakistan and Afghanistan; winters in southwestern Asia.

== Description ==
A medium-sized elegant wheatear with long wings and long legs. It measures 14 cm (5.5 in) long, with 25–27 cm (9.8–10.6 in) wingspan, and weigh 21–32 g (0.74–1.13 oz). In summer the male Finsch's wheatear is a white and black bird. The white crown, central back, and belly contrast with the black face, throat, and wings. The tail and rump are white, with an inverted black T giving a pattern like eastern black-eared wheatear, but with a uniformly wide terminal band.

The female is brown-grey above, becoming dirty white below. The tail pattern is similar to the male's.

Its call is a whistled tsit, and the song is a mix of clear notes with whistles and crackling.

== Ecology ==
Finsch's wheatear breeds in semi-desert and stony hillsides from Armenia east to Afghanistan and western Pakistan. It is a short-distance migrant, wintering in Egypt, Cyprus and the Greater Middle East. The nest is built in a rock crevice, and 4-5 eggs is the normal clutch.

It feeds mainly on insects.

== Status ==
The species has a wide distribution range, a large population, and although its population trends are unknown, they are not believed to be fast enough to approach vulnerability. As a result, it is classified as "Least Concern" by the International Union for Conservation of Nature (IUCN).

In Europe, the estimated breeding population ranges from 102,000 to 309,000 pairs, representing approximately 25% of the species' global range. This translates to a preliminary global population estimate of 816,000 to 2,470,000 mature individuals, which requires further validation.
