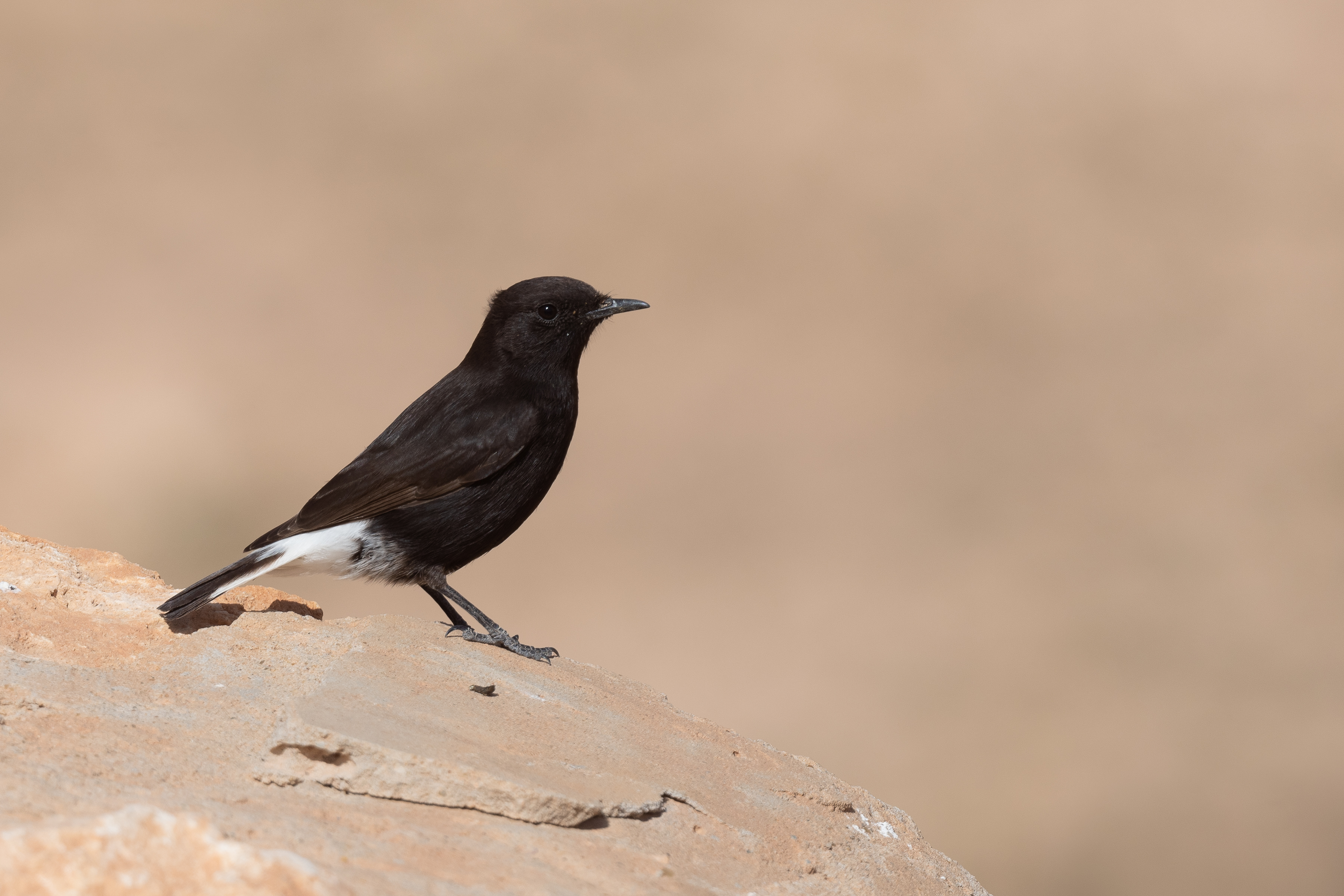
- in Tunisia

Conservation status
- Least Concern (IUCN 3.1)

Scientific classification
- Kingdom: Animalia
- Phylum: Chordata
- Class: Aves
- Order: Passeriformes
- Family: Muscicapidae
- Genus: Oenanthe
- Species: O. leucura

Binomial name
- Oenanthe leucura (Gmelin, JF, 1789)
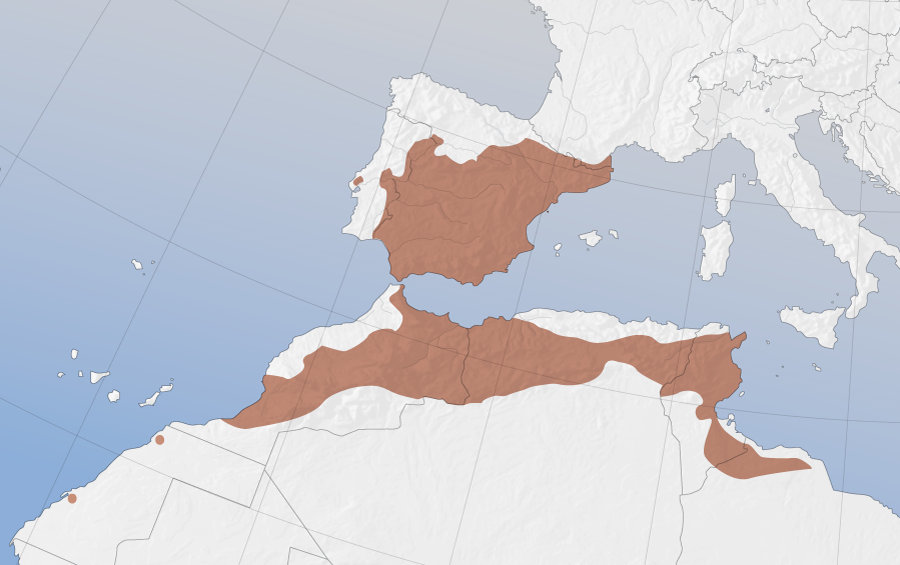
- Range of O. leucura (resident)

= Black wheatear =

Species of bird

The black wheatear (Oenanthe leucura) is a wheatear, a small passerine bird in the Old World flycatcher family Muscicapidae. It is found in the Iberian Peninsula and western North Africa.

== Taxonomy ==
The black wheatear was formally described in 1789 by the German naturalist Johann Friedrich Gmelin in his revised and expanded edition of Carl Linnaeus's Systema Naturae. He placed it with the thrushes in the genus Turdus, coined the binomial name Turdus leucurus and specified the locality as Gibraltar. The specific epithet is from Ancient Greek leukouros meaning "white-tailed". Gmelin based his account on the "White-tailed thrush" that had been described and illustrated in 1783 by the English ornithologist John Latham in his multi-volume work A General Synopsis of Birds. Latham had examined a specimen in the Leverian Museum in London. The black wheatear is now placed in the genus Oenanthe that was introduced in 1816 by the French ornithologist Louis Pierre Vieillot.

Two subspecies are recognised:

- O. l. leucura (Gmelin, JF, 1789) – Portugal, Spain and south France
- O. l. riggenbachi (Hartert, EJO, 1909) – northwest Africa

== Description ==
This large 16–18 cm long wheatear. The male of this species is all black except a white rump and mainly white tail. The female is similar, but dark brown rather than black. It has a loud thrush-like song.

The similar white-crowned wheatear (Oenanthe leucopyga) also breeds in the African part of the black wheatear's range, but the black wheatear has a black inverted "T" on its white tail, whereas white-crowned has only a black centre to its tail. The black wheatear never has a white crown, but young white-crowned wheatears also lack this feature.

== Behaviour ==
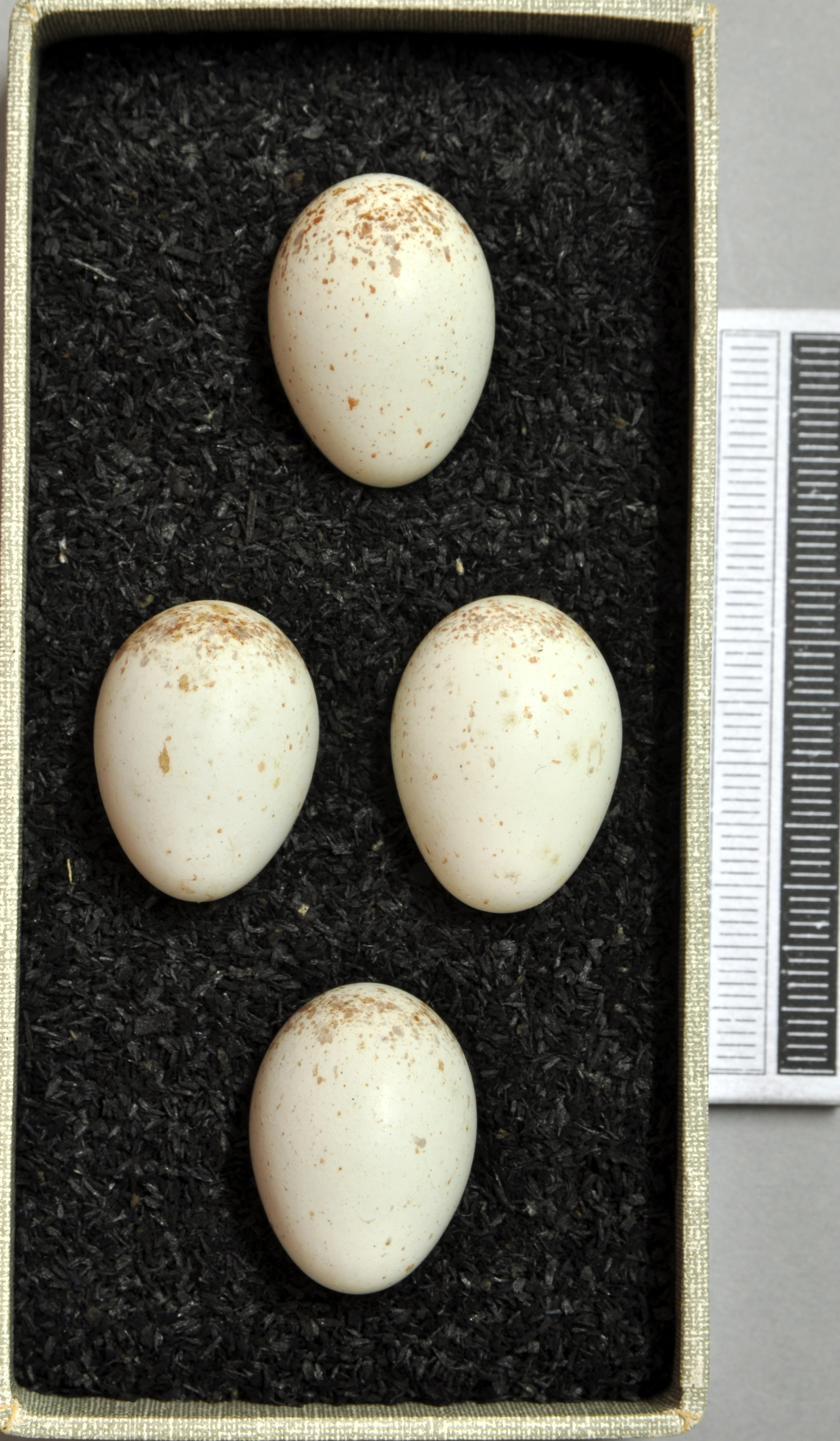
Eggs, Collection Museum Wiesbaden

It breeds on cliffs and rocky slopes in western north Africa and Iberia. It no longer breeds in southern France. It is largely resident and nests in crevices in rocks laying 3-6 eggs. The food of this wheatear is mainly insects.
