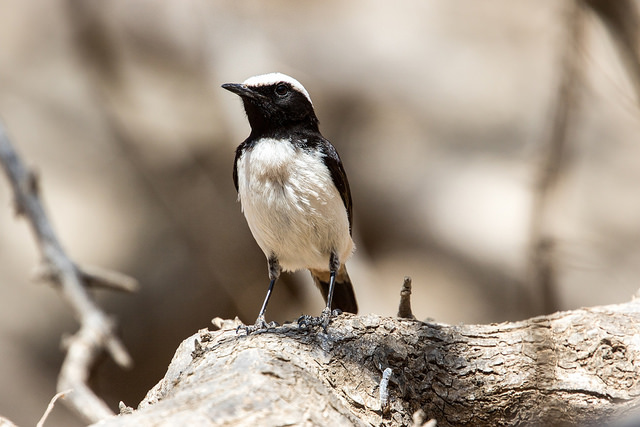

Conservation status
- Least Concern (IUCN 3.1)

Scientific classification
- Kingdom: Animalia
- Phylum: Chordata
- Class: Aves
- Order: Passeriformes
- Family: Muscicapidae
- Genus: Oenanthe
- Species: O. lugentoides

Binomial name
- Oenanthe lugentoides (Seebohm, 1881)

Synonyms
- Saxicola lugentoides

= Arabian wheatear =

Species of bird

The Arabian wheatear (Oenanthe lugentoides) is a species of bird in the family Muscicapidae. It is found in Oman, Saudi Arabia and Yemen.

== Subspecies ==
There are two recognised subspecies:

- Oenanthe lugentoides lugentoides, the nominate subspecies.
- Oenanthe lugentoides boscaweni, Oman
