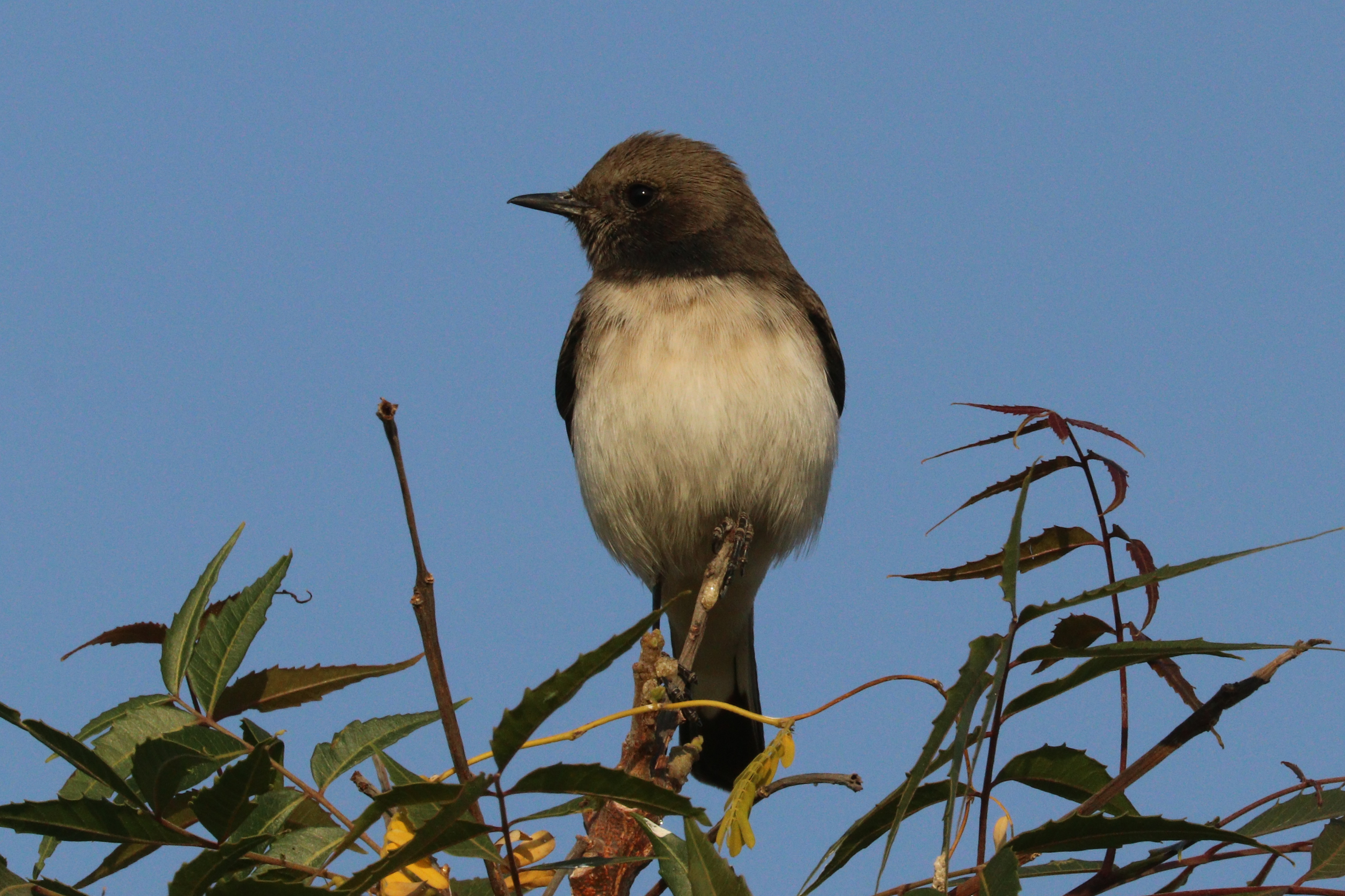
- Male O. p. picata
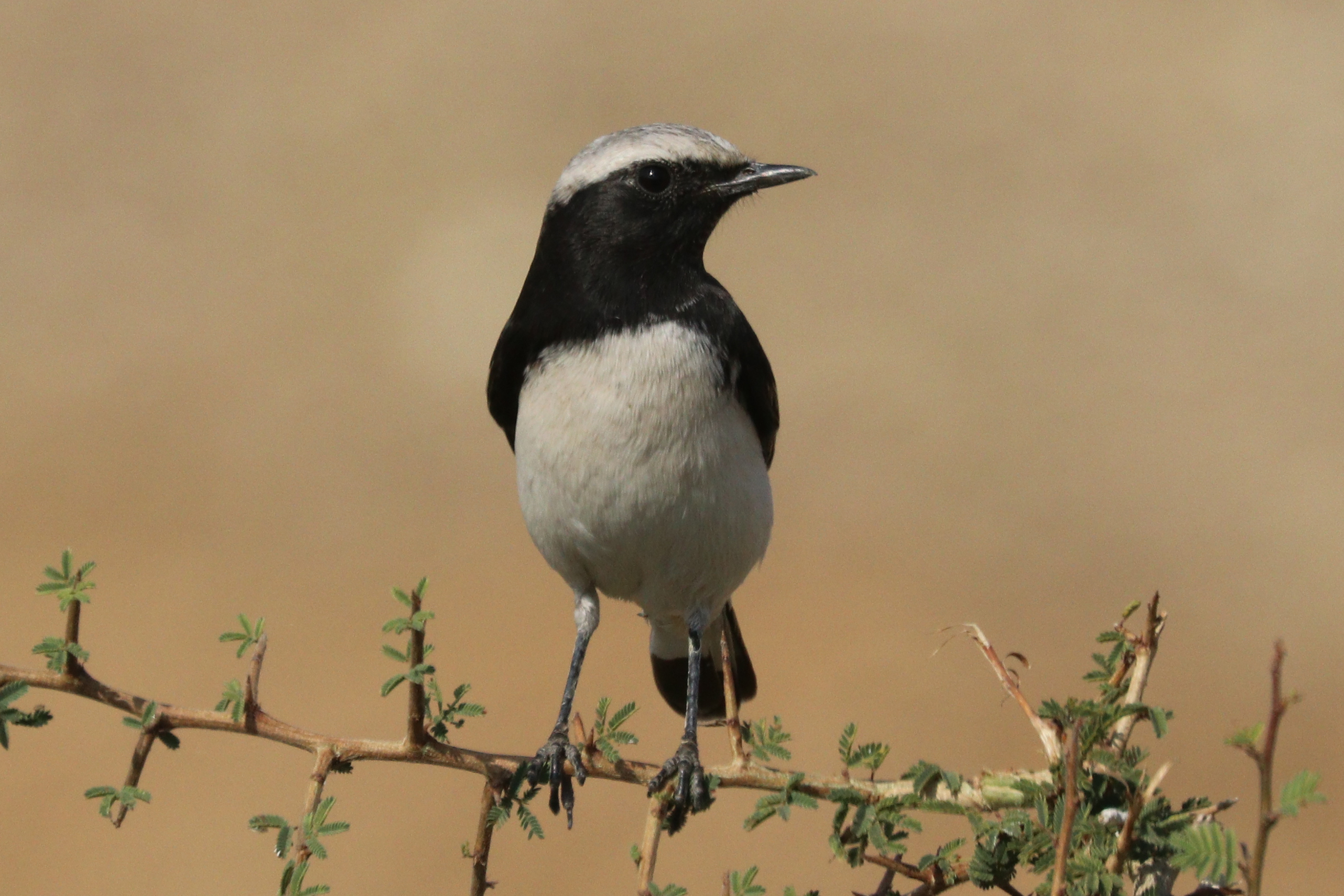
- Male O. p. capistrata Both Jawai, Rajasthan, India

Conservation status
- Least Concern (IUCN 3.1)

Scientific classification
- Kingdom: Animalia
- Phylum: Chordata
- Class: Aves
- Order: Passeriformes
- Family: Muscicapidae
- Genus: Oenanthe
- Species: O. picata

Binomial name
- Oenanthe picata (Blyth, 1847)

= Variable wheatear =

Species of bird

The variable wheatear (Oenanthe picata) is a species of bird in the family Muscicapidae. It is found in Afghanistan, Egypt, India, Iran, Kazakhstan, Lebanon, Nepal, Oman, Pakistan, Russia, Tajikistan, Turkmenistan, the United Arab Emirates, and Uzbekistan.

Its natural habitat is hot deserts.

== Description ==
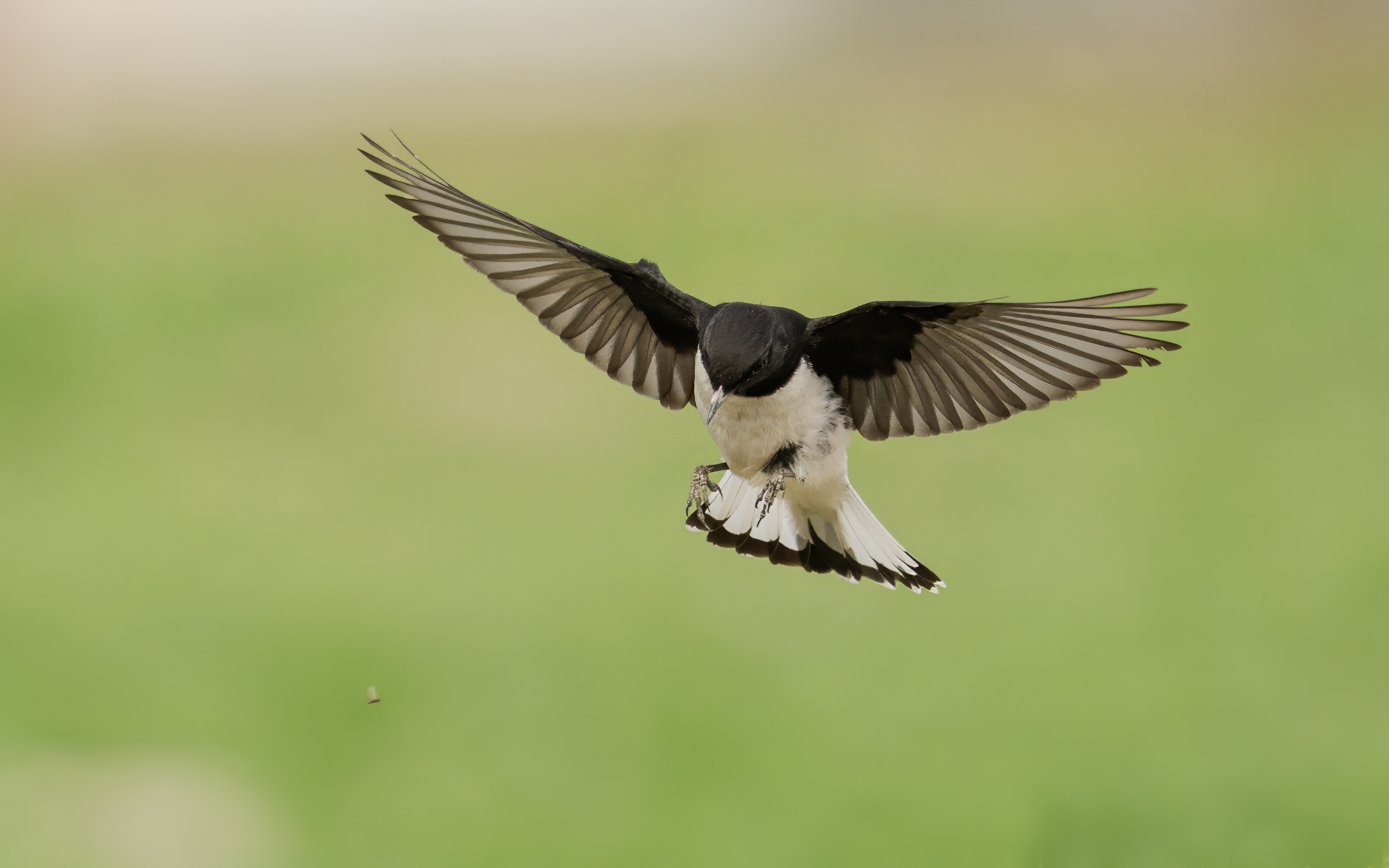
Variable wheatear trying to catch an insect in mid air in Shivapuri Nagarjun National Park, Nepal.

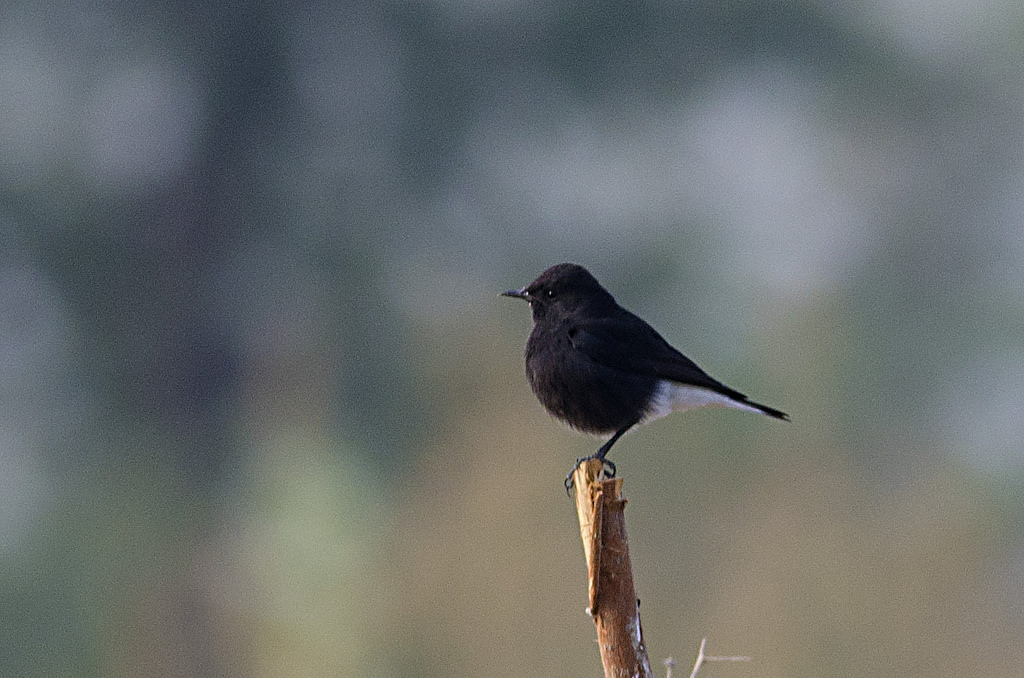
O. p. opistholeuca

The variable wheatear is a bird of arid and semi-arid region, and is locally abundant in barren rocky areas, sand dunes with scrub vegetation, cultivation, ravines, outside villages and nomadic encampments.

It is polymorphic and has three distinct morphs.

1. Black-bellied phase (opistholeuca). Male (adult). Entirely jet black except rump, under tail-coverts, base and sides of tail which are white; central rectrices and terminal band of tail black. Female has black parts replaced by sooty black.
2. White-bellied phase (picata) Male (adult). Like the preceding but belly white. Female similar to male but black parts replaced by grayish brown; belly more buffish.
3. White-crowned phase (capistrata). Male (adult). Like picata, with white belly and black throat, but crown and nape white. Female similar to male but black parts and crown earthy brown; belly more buffish.

The geographical dominance of the three types of females does not exactly correspond to the dominances of the three color phases of the males, but in their wintering grounds there is some corresponding separation.

== Distribution and habitat ==
This species is found in northeast and southeast Iran and Turkmenistan eastern to western Tien Shan, Pamirs, and northern and western Pakistan; non-breeding in southwest Asia. Common and generally distributed in winter in Pakistan and northwestern India southeast to Delhi, central Madhya Pradesh and northern Maharashtra (Khandesh). Arrives on breeding grounds in March (Baluchistan) or mid April (Chitral), remains till September. May be seen in winter quarters from the beginning of August (Karachi dist) till the end of March.

In winter frequents stony semi-desert, and desert with sparsely scrubbed sand dunes, cultivation, ravines, outskirts of villages and nomadic encampments, cattle corrals, etc.; usually from almost sea level to c. 1200 m, but has been observed also at 2700 m in deep snow.
