= Cab =

Cab or CAB may refer to:

== Transport ==
- Cab (locomotive), the driving compartment of a locomotive
- Cab car
- Cabin (truck), an enclosed space in a truck where the driver is seated
- Cabriolet (carriage) (obsolete), a type of horse-drawn carriage
- Civil Aeronautics Board, an agency of the federal government of the United States
- Constructions Aéronautiques du Béarn, former French aircraft manufacturer
- Controller anti-lock brake, see Anti-lock braking system
- NATO reporting name for the Lisunov Li-2, aircraft
- Taxi, a type of vehicle for hire with a driver
- Tractor unit of an articulated lorry, known in Britain as an artic cab

== People ==
- Cab Calloway (1907–1994), American jazz singer and bandleader
- Cris Cab (born 1993), American singer and songwriter

=== Fictional characters ===
- Cab (Transformers), a fictional character from the Transformers TV series

== Places ==
- Čab, a village in Nitra District in Slovakia

=== Buildings and structures ===
- Causeway Bay station, Hong Kong; MTR station code CAB
- Church Administration Building of The Church of Jesus Christ of Latter-day Saints

== Music ==
- The Cab, an American pop-rock band
- CAB (band), a jazz fusion band
  - CAB (album), 2000
- "Cab" (song), a 2005 song by Train
- "C.A.B. (Catch a Body)", a 2022 song by Chris Brown

== Computing ==
- Cabinet (file format), with filename extension "CAB", a Microsoft Windows installation archive format
- Central African Backbone
- Change-advisory board
- Choose and Book, UK NHS E-booking software
- CA/Browser Forum (Certification Authority Browser Forum)

== Sports ==
- Argentine Basketball Confederation (Rioplatense Spanish: Confederación Argentina de Bássquetbol), a sports governing body
- Logo of Club Atlético Banfield, a football team in Argentina
- Logo of Club Atlético Belgrano, a football team in Argentina
- Club Athlétique Bizertin, a football club from Bizerte in Tunisia
- Cricket Association of Bengal, governing body for cricket in West Bengal, India
- Curaçaose Atletiek Bond, the governing body for athletics in Curaçao

== Groups, organizations, companies ==
- Cambodia Asia Bank (CAB), a bank of Cambodia
- Canadian Association of Broadcasters
- Citizens Advice Bureau, UK charity giving free advice for money, legal, consumer and other issues
- Citizens Advice Bureau New Zealand, NZ charity giving free advice for money, legal, consumer and other issues
- Cooperative Analysis of Broadcasting, company originating the Crossley ratings for radio programs
- Credito Agrario Bresciano, defunct bank of Italy
- Criminal Assets Bureau, Irish agency targeting proceeds of crime

== Other uses ==
- C.A.B., a British television show
- Cabernet Sauvignon
- Cabochon, also called "cab", a shaped, polished gemstone
- Cellulose acetate butyrate, a type of plastic
- Certified Angus Beef, meat grading designation set up by the American Angus Association
- Citizenship (Amendment) Act, 2019, a law enacted by the Parliament of India
- Combat Action Badge, a military badge worn in the U.S.
- Combat Aviation Brigade, a helicopter unit in the United States Army
- Complete or Combined Androgen Blockade (CAB), see Maximum androgen blockade, medical treatment for prostate cancer
- Comprehensive Agreement on the Bangsamoro, a peace agreement
- Comic Arts Brooklyn, an annual comics festival in Brooklyn, New York
- Catholic American Bible, an upcoming translation of the Bible

== See also ==
- CABS (disambiguation)
- KAB (disambiguation)
