= CABS =

CABS may refer to:

- Campus Area Bus Service, a bus system at Ohio State University
- Centre for Airborne Systems
- Current Awareness in Biological Sciences
- Committee Against Bird Slaughter
- cabs (C function)

== See also ==
- Cab (disambiguation)
