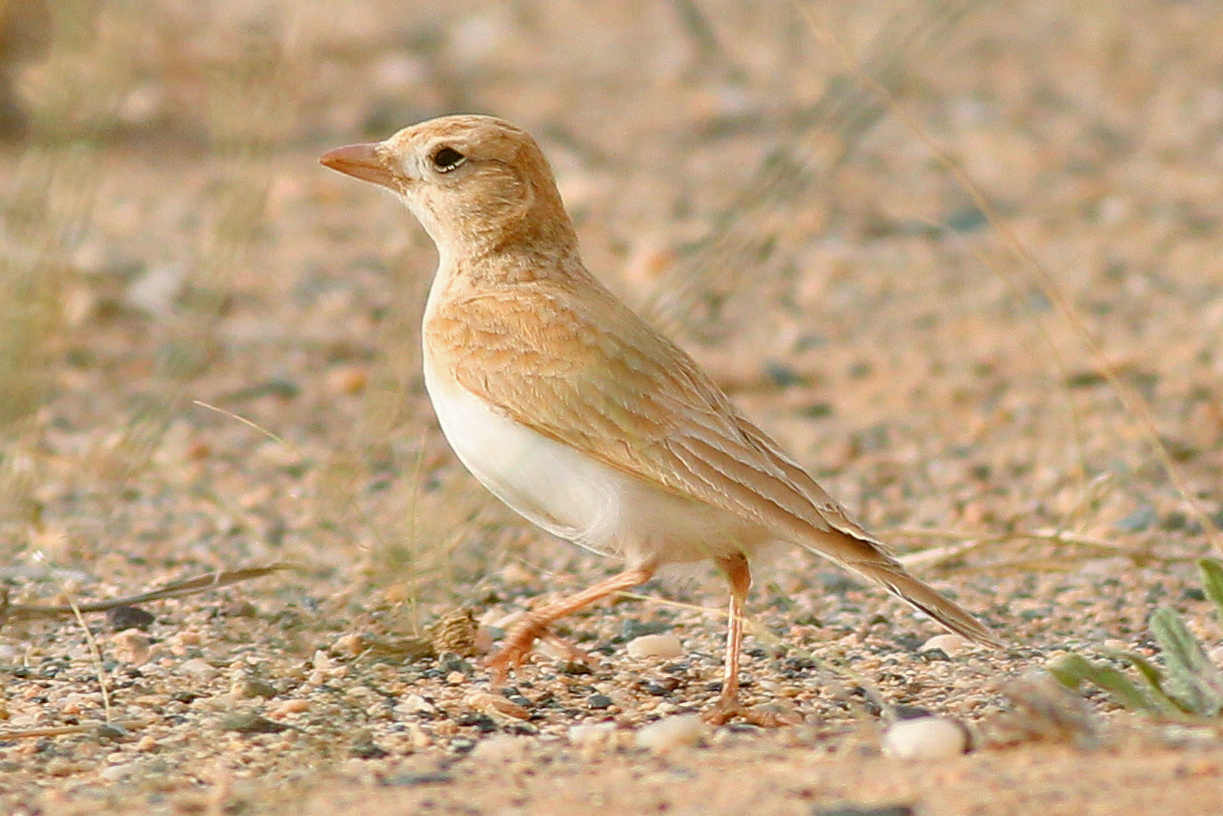
- Dunn's lark

Scientific classification
- Kingdom: Animalia
- Phylum: Chordata
- Class: Aves
- Order: Passeriformes
- Family: Alaudidae
- Genus: Eremalauda; Sclater, WL, 1926

Type species
- Calendula dunni Shelley, 1904

= Eremalauda =

Genus of birds

Eremalauda is a genus of larks in the family Alaudidae.

It contains the following two species:

Image	Common name	Scientific name
	Dunn's lark	Eremalauda dunni
	Arabian lark	Eremalauda eremodites
