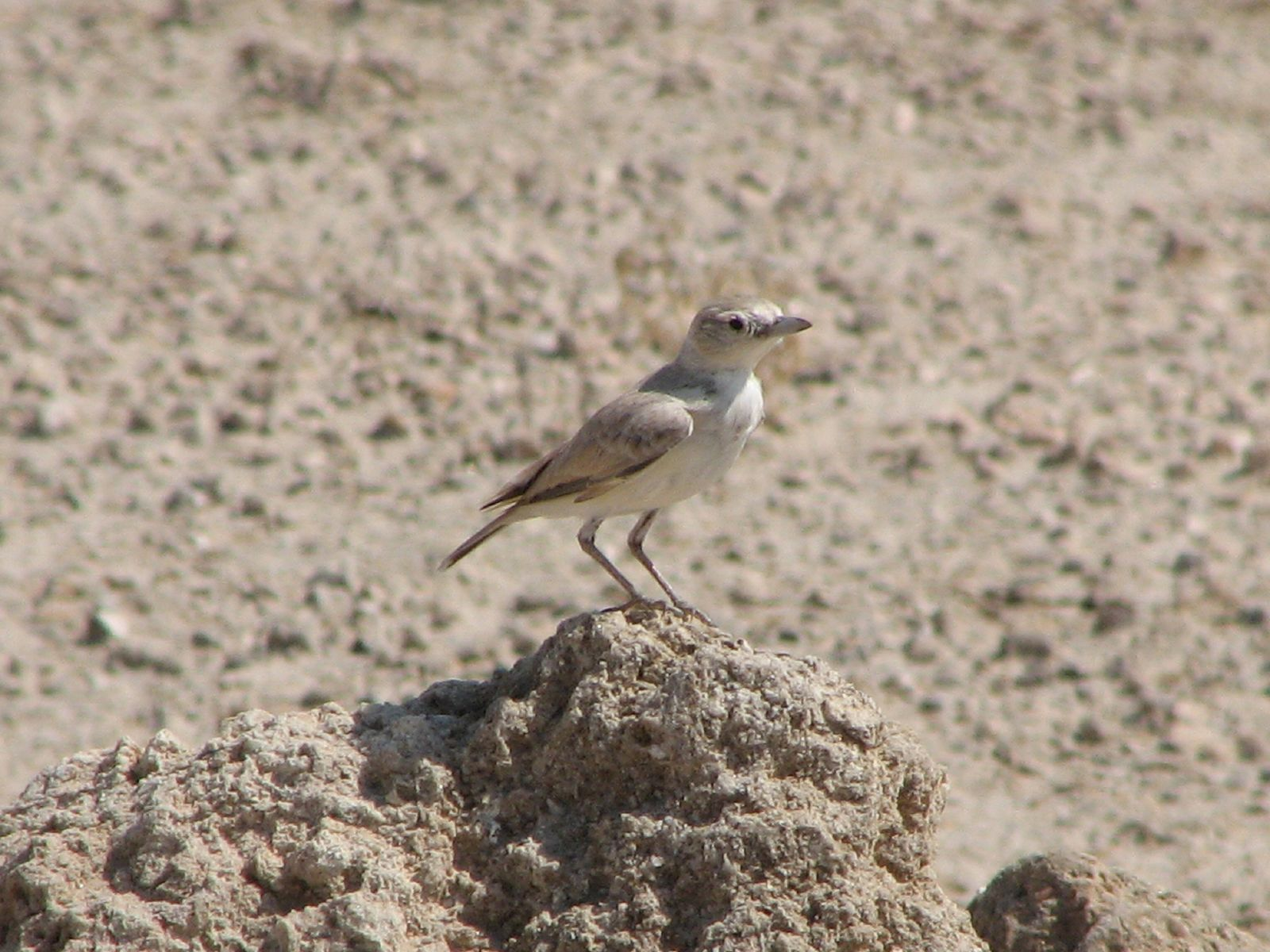

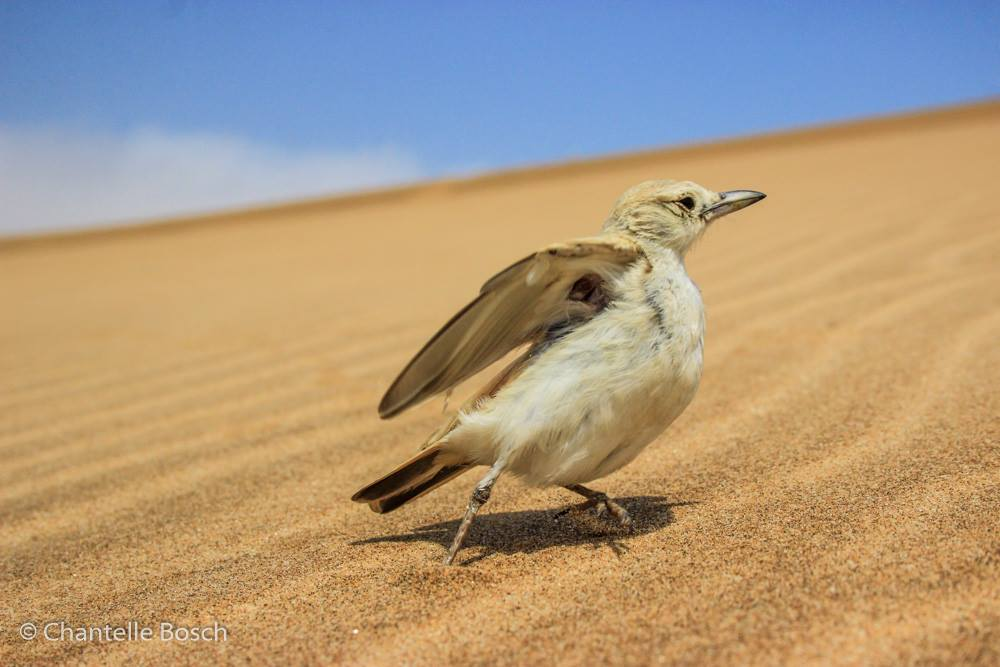

Conservation status
- Least Concern (IUCN 3.1)

Scientific classification
- Kingdom: Animalia
- Phylum: Chordata
- Class: Aves
- Order: Passeriformes
- Family: Alaudidae
- Genus: Ammomanopsis; Bianchi, 1905
- Species: A. grayi

Binomial name
- Ammomanopsis grayi (Wahlberg, 1855)

Subspecies
- See text
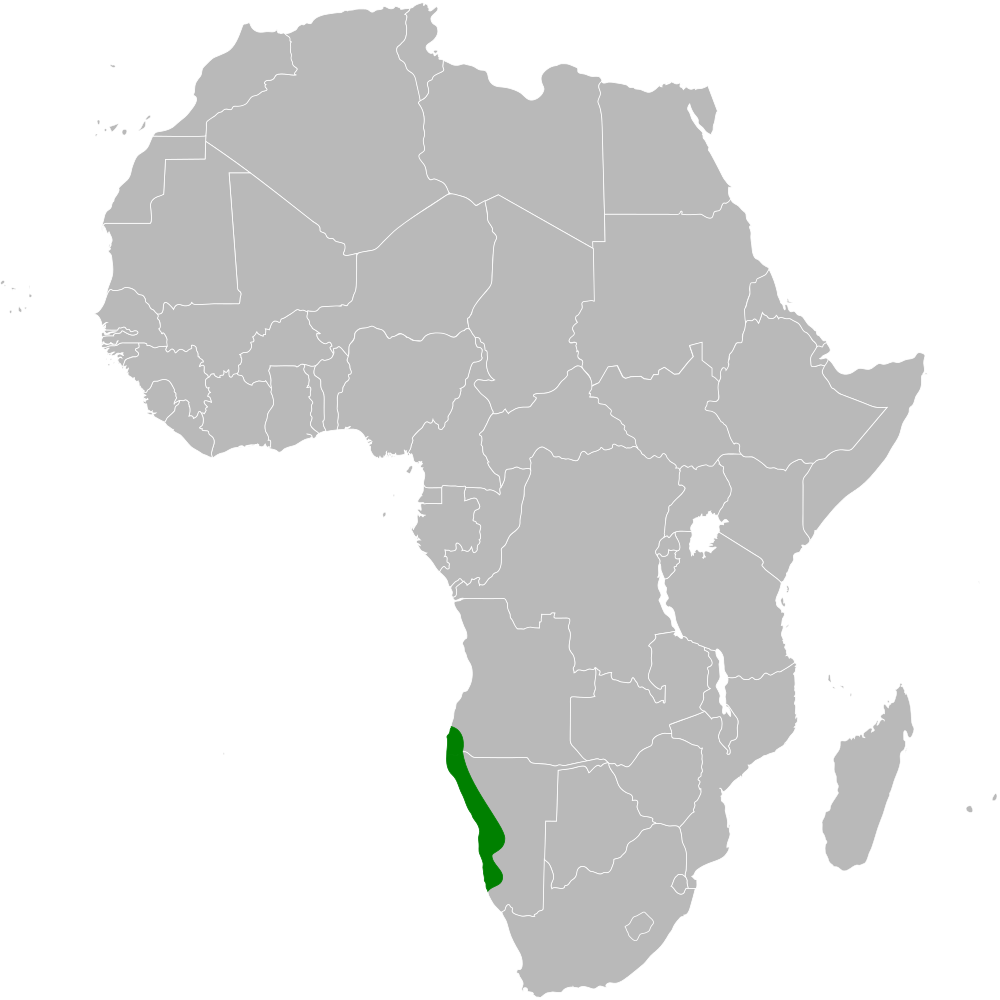

Synonyms
- Alauda grayi; Ammomanes grayi

= Gray's lark =

Species of bird

Gray's lark (Ammomanopsis grayi) is a species of lark in the family Alaudidae. It is found in south-western Africa in its natural habitat of hot deserts.

== Taxonomy and systematics ==
Gray's lark was originally described as a species within the genus Alauda. It was then placed in the sister genus Ammomanes until re-classified in 2009 by the IOC into the monotypic genus Ammomanopsis. Some authorities still consider the species as Ammomanes grayi. Other names for Gray's lark include Gray's desert lark and Gray's sand lark.

=== Subspecies ===
Two subspecies are recognized:

- A. g. hoeschi - (Niethammer, 1955): Found in north-western Namibia and south-western Angola
- A. g. grayi - (Wahlberg, 1855): Found in west-central and south-western Namibia
