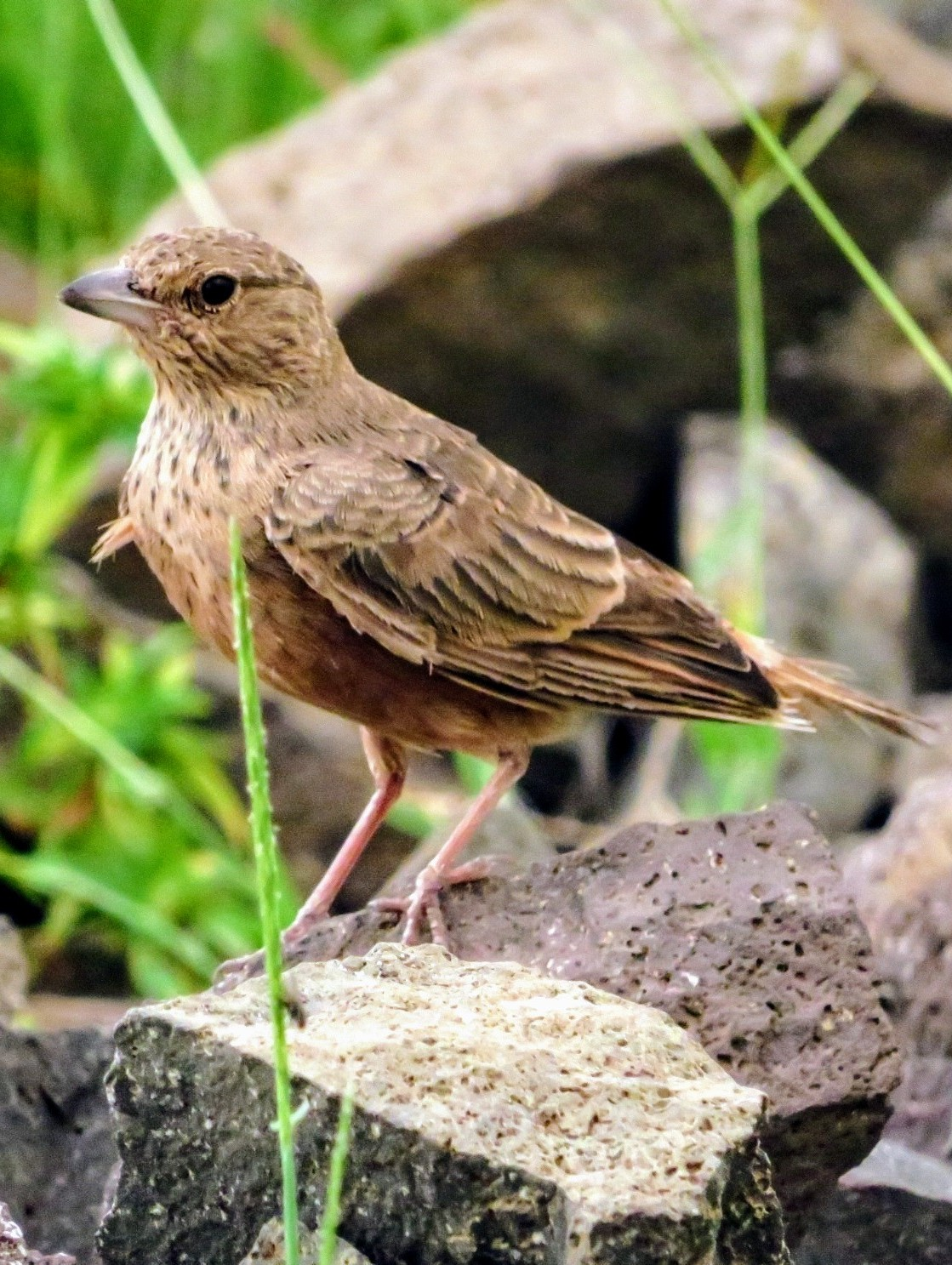
- At Jamnagar, Gujarat

Conservation status
- Near Threatened (IUCN 3.1)

Scientific classification
- Kingdom: Animalia
- Phylum: Chordata
- Class: Aves
- Order: Passeriformes
- Family: Alaudidae
- Genus: Ammomanes
- Species: A. phoenicura

Binomial name
- Ammomanes phoenicura (Franklin, 1831)

Subspecies
- See text
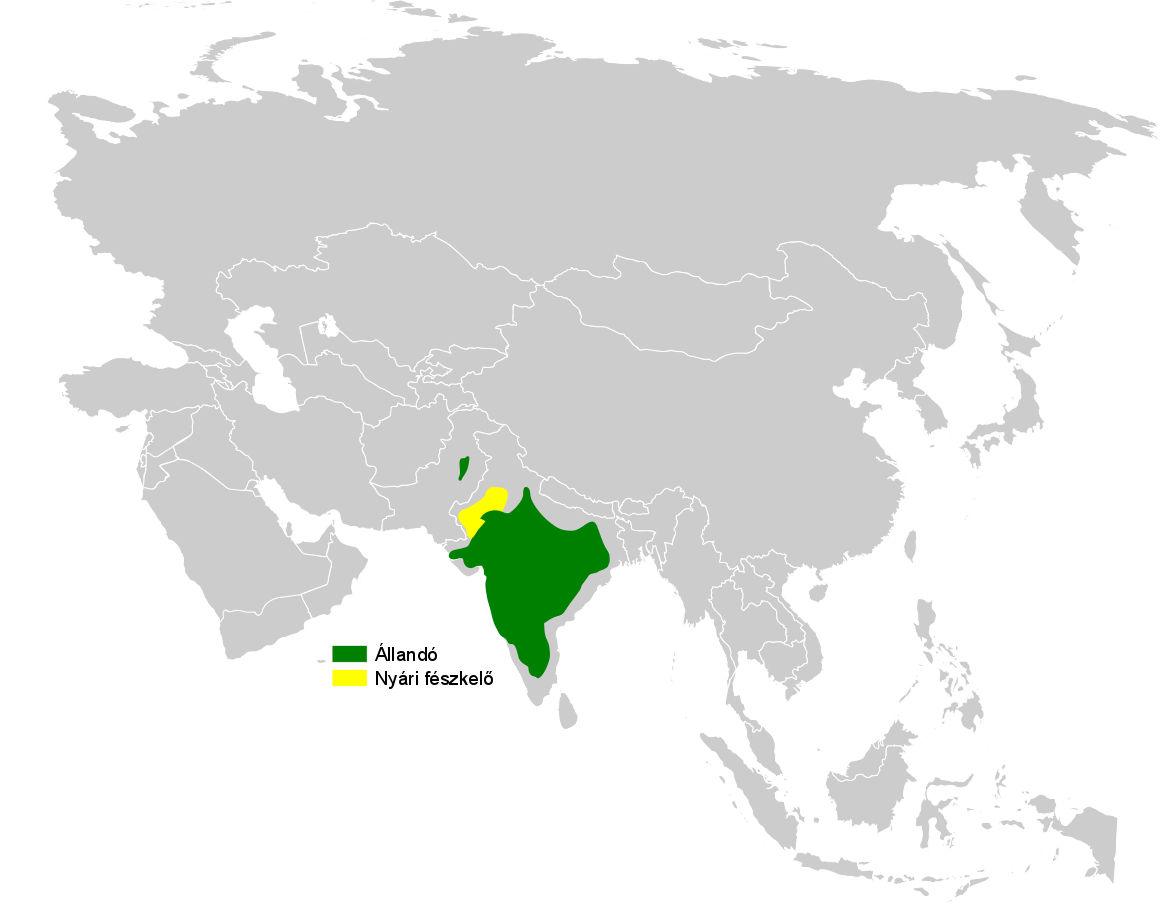

Synonyms
- Ammomanes phoenicurus; Mirafra phoenicura

= Rufous-tailed lark =

Species of bird

The rufous-tailed lark (Ammomanes phoenicura), also sometimes called the rufous-tailed finch-lark, is a ground bird found in the drier open stony habitats of India and parts of Pakistan. Like other species in the genus it has a large finch-like bill with a slightly curved edge to the upper mandible. The dull brown colour matches the soil as it forages for grass seeds, grain and insects. Males and females are indistinguishable in the field but during the breeding season, the male has a courtship display that involves flying up steeply and then nose-diving and pulling up in a series of stepped wavy dips accompanied by calling. They forage on the ground in pairs or small groups.

== Taxonomy and systematics ==
The rufous-tailed lark was originally placed in the genus Mirafra. Alternate names for the rufous-tailed lark include bar-tailed lark, rufous-tailed desert lark, and rufous-tailed finch-lark.

=== Subspecies ===
Some taxonomists in the past included the bar-tailed lark as a subspecies of the rufous-tailed lark but the two are now generally considered to be separate species. Walter Koelz designated the peninsular Indian population south of a line across India from Hubli to Bellary and to Ellore as a separate subspecies testaceus (=testacea) that has brighter rufous colours. Some later workers treat the species as monotypic because specimens vary in the brightness (the reddest individuals being from Mysore and Salem). Two subspecies are recognized:

- A. p. phoenicura - (Franklin, 1831): Found in north-eastern Pakistan and central India
- A. p. testacea - Koelz, 1951: Found in southern India

== Description ==
Like other Ammomanes larks, the species has a wide curved beak with the nostrils covered by feathers. The hindclaw is as long as the hindtoe and moderately curved. The base of the lower mandible is fleshy while the rest is horn-grey. The legs are also flesh coloured. In the field, the rufous colour, the reddish rump and a dark tail band (narrowing towards the sides to give a triangular shape) are distinctive. The throat is lightly streaked in dark brown. Young birds have less streaking on the underside.

== Distribution ==
The species is found mainly in low altitude dry regions in open habitats without significant tree cover. It is resident mainly within India south of the Ganges extending west to Kutch and the Aravallis of Rajasthan. They are summer visitors to parts of Pakistan in northern Punjab and in southern Nepal. The species does not occur in Sri Lanka and reports of their occurrence on the island of Rameshwaram have not been confirmed while the species is largely absent along the Western Ghats region particularly in Kerala.

== Ecology and behaviour ==
Usually seen on the ground, but sometimes perching on wires, these birds are not secretive. They walk on the ground making quick dashes to capture insects and when disturbed crouch and stay still to flush only when approached very close. The breeding season is from February to May. The display of males involves rising high with deep beats of the wing and then descending in a series of nose dives accompanied by short burbling or chirruping notes. They also call while perched. The nest is built in a depression in the ground and two to four eggs form the typical clutch. The eggs are broad oval with some gloss. The colour is creamy or pale yellowish-white with spots all over but denser at the broad end. The incubation period has not been ascertained.

== Gallery ==
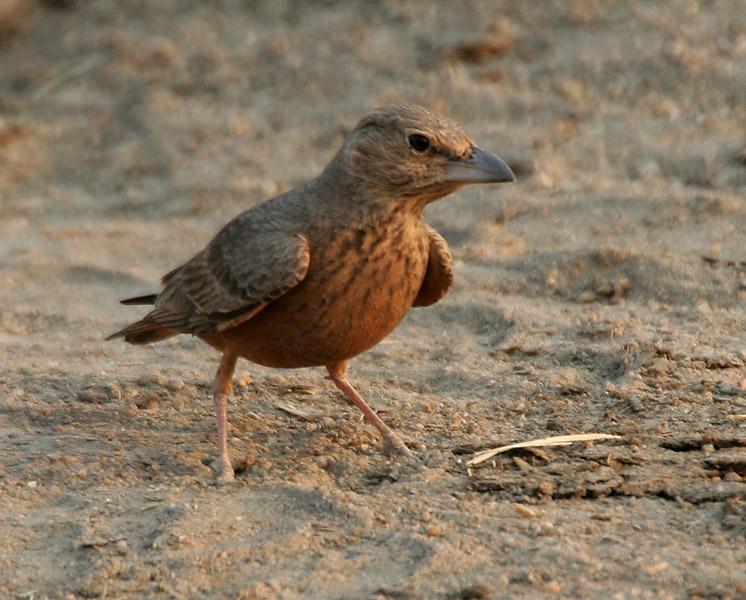
Adults have streaks on the throat and breast

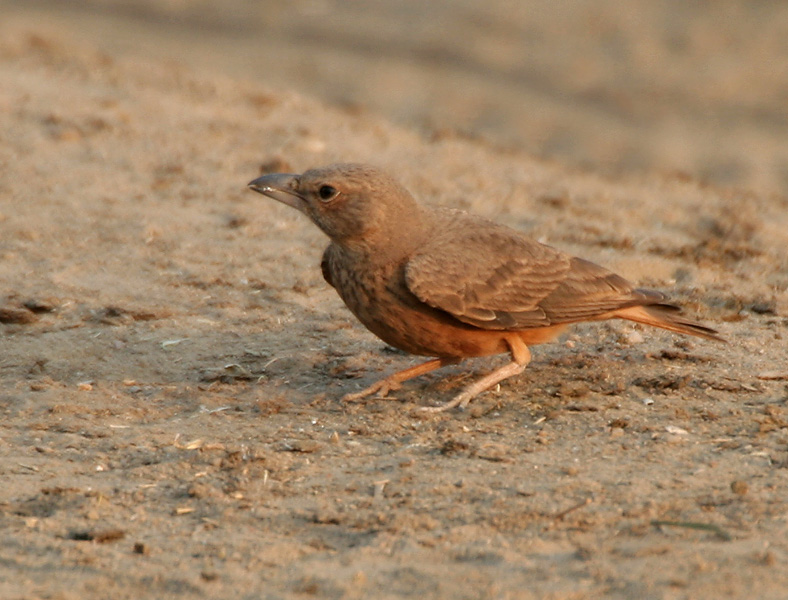
Feeding on seeds

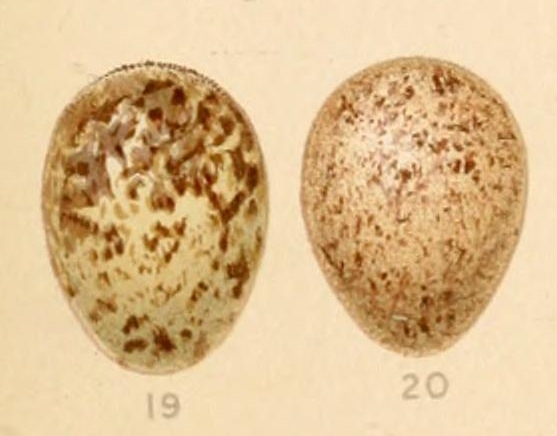
Eggs
