= Black Sea–Mediterranean Flyway =

Group of bird migration routes

The Black Sea–Mediterranean Flyway is a group of well-established routes by which many bird species migrate annually between Palearctic breeding grounds in northern Europe and Asia, and non-breeding habitats in southern Europe and Africa.

This flyway has been studied less than some other major routes. A 2003 study found that population trends for wetland birds using this route had declined by 65% over the last decade, with three times as many species in decline than were evidencing increased numbers. Different taxa use different flight paths, with waders tending to follow the Black Sea and Mediterranean route southwards into Africa while swans, geese and ducks mostly use a northeast / southwest oriented route.

== Notable locations ==
- Lower Ob, Russia
- Bosporus, Turkey
- Jezreel Valley, Israel
- Southern Arava valley and Eilat Mountains, Israel
- Sudd, South Sudan
- Lake Débo, Mali

== Threats ==
The major threat to the 2.5 billion migratory birds the pass through the Levant twice a year comes from hunters who shoot migrating birds both for food and for sport. In Lebanon, 2.6 million migratory birds are illegally shot or trapped every year. in such density that in 2017 "Hundreds of dead birds were left uncollected on the ground, and the soft breast feathers of eagles could be seen falling like snow as the birds were shot from the sky," according to Axel Hirschfeld, campaign and operations manager with the Committee Against Bird Slaughter.
