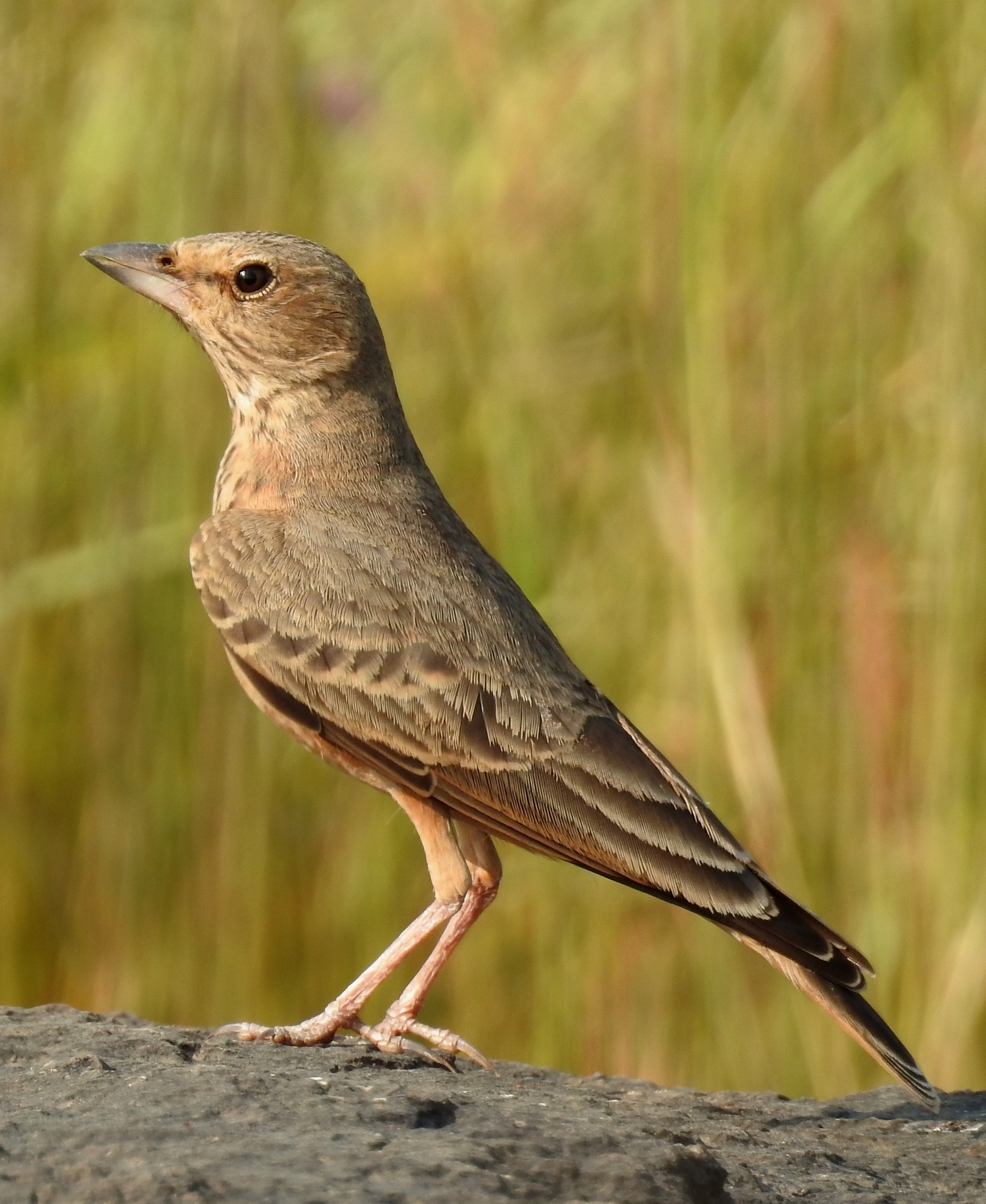
- Rufous-tailed lark(Ammomanes phoenicura)

Scientific classification
- Kingdom: Animalia
- Phylum: Chordata
- Class: Aves
- Order: Passeriformes
- Family: Alaudidae
- Genus: Ammomanes; Cabanis, 1851

Type species
- Ammomanes pallida Cabanis 1851

Species
- 3, see text

= Ammomanes =

Genus of birds

Ammomanes is a genus of lark in the family Alaudidae.

== Taxonomy and systematics ==
=== Extant species ===
It contains the following three species:

Image	Scientific name	Common name	Distribution
	Ammomanes deserti	Desert lark	from Morocco to western India
	Ammomanes cinctura	Bar-tailed lark	from Morocco to Pakistan
	Ammomanes phoenicura	Rufous-tailed lark	India and parts of Pakistan

Additionally, some authorities continue to place Gray's lark within the genus Ammomanes.

=== Former species ===
Other species, or subspecies, formerly considered as species in the genus Ammomanes include:

- Gray's lark ( as Ammomanes grayi)
- Red lark (as Ammomanes burra or Ammomanes burrus)
- Barlow's lark (as Pseudammomanes barlowi)
- Dunn's lark (as Ammomanes dunni)
