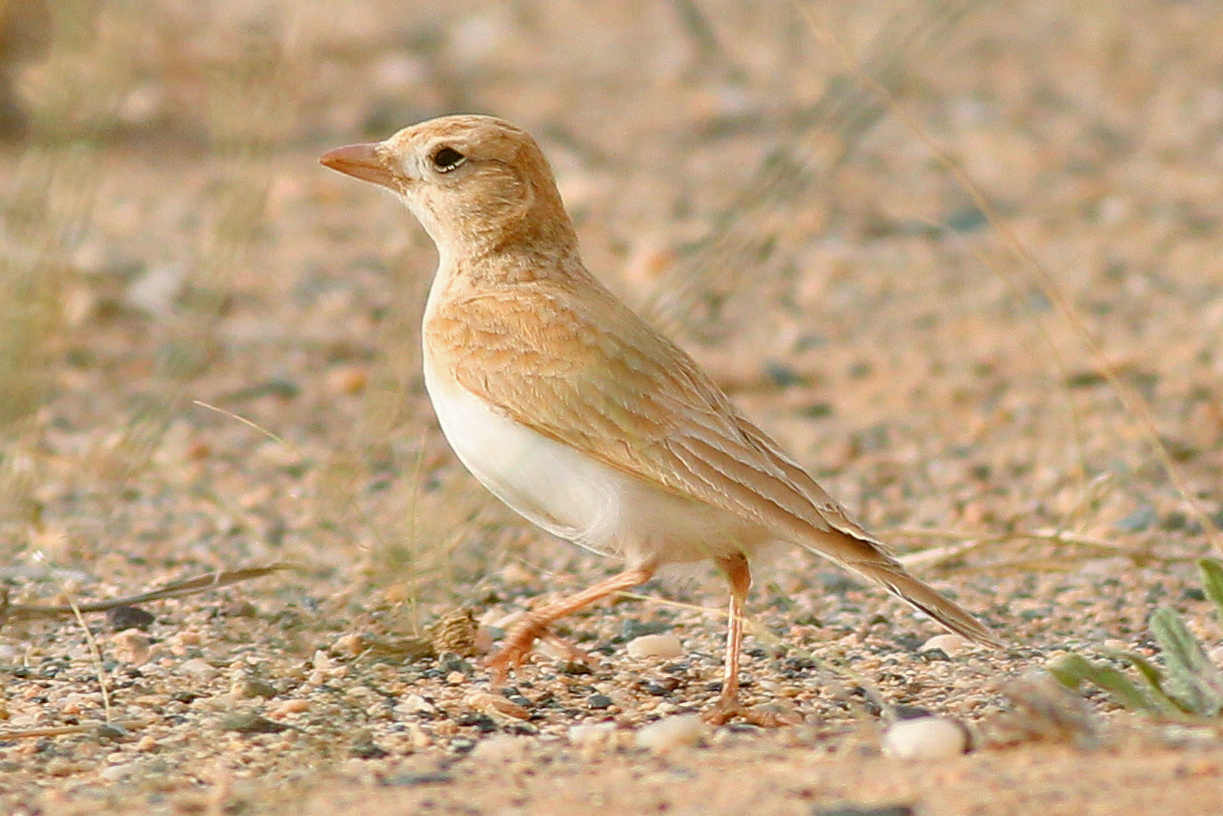

Conservation status
- Least Concern (IUCN 3.1)

Scientific classification
- Kingdom: Animalia
- Phylum: Chordata
- Class: Aves
- Order: Passeriformes
- Family: Alaudidae
- Genus: Eremalauda
- Species: E. dunni

Binomial name
- Eremalauda dunni (Shelley, 1904)

Synonyms
- Ammomanes dunni; Calendula dunni

= Dunn's lark =

Species of bird

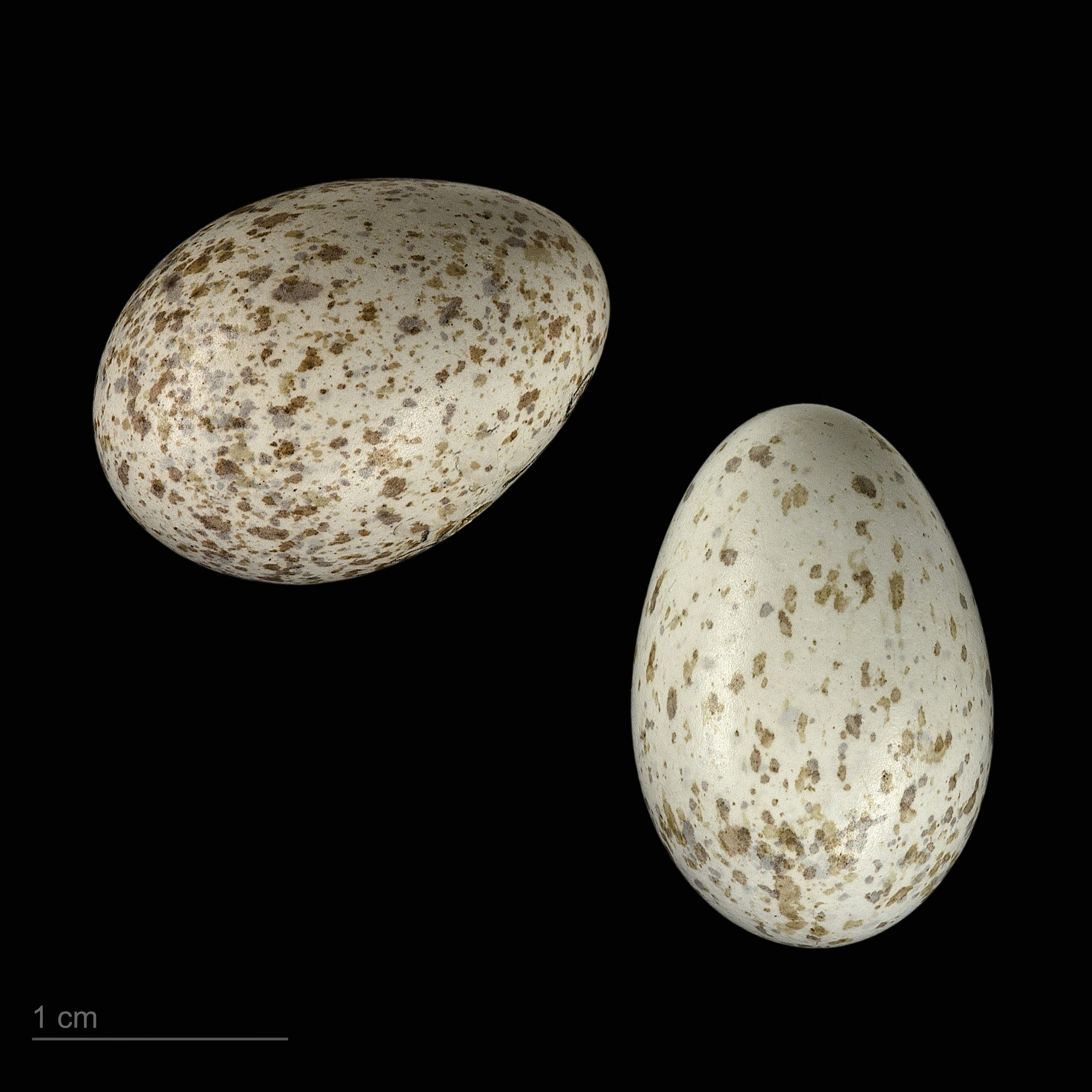
Eremalauda dunni - MHNT

Dunn's lark (Eremalauda dunni) is a small passerine bird of the lark family. It is a desert bird which is found across parts of the Sahara from Mauritania to central Sudan.

== Taxonomy and systematics ==
Dunn's lark was originally described as belonging to the genus Calendula and has also been classified by some authorities as belonging to the genus Ammomanes.

Stark's lark was formerly also classified in the genus Eremalauda; it has since been moved to Spizocorys, leaving Dunn's lark as the only species in the genus Eremalauda.

The Arabian lark (E. eremodites) of the Arabian Peninsula was formerly considered conspecific, but was classified as a distinct species by the Handbook of the Birds of the World Alive and by Birdlife International, and later by the International Ornithological Congress.

== Description ==
Dunn's lark is a stocky bird with a large head and broad wings. It is 14 to 15 cm long with a wingspan of 25 to 30 cm. The upperparts are pale sandy-brown with darker streaks. The underparts are whitish with some dark streaks on the breast. There is a pale stripe over the eye and a pale ring around it. Birds have dark moustachial and malar stripes and a dark mark under the eye. The short, broad tail is black below while the upperside is black with rusty-brown central feathers and pale outer feathers. The bill is large, heavy and pale pinkish or yellowish in colour. After moulting, the birds become gradually duller and the dark markings fainter as the plumage becomes more worn.

The song is a scratchy warbling with short whistling phrases. Males sing either from the ground or in flight, hovering 30 metres or more above the ground.

== Distribution and habitat ==
In Africa, the species has a scattered range from Mauritania through Mali, Niger and Chad to Sudan.

Dunn's larks are found in flat, arid areas with light vegetation such as grass and scattered bushes.

== Behaviour and ecology ==
=== Breeding ===
The nest is a scrape on the ground which is lined with vegetation. Two or three eggs are laid and are incubated for 13 to 16 days. They are white with blackish and lavender spots.

=== Food and feeding ===
The diet mainly includes seeds and insects. Birds feed on the ground and sometimes dig for food with their bills. They typically feed in flocks outside the breeding season, moving nomadically in response to rainfall.
