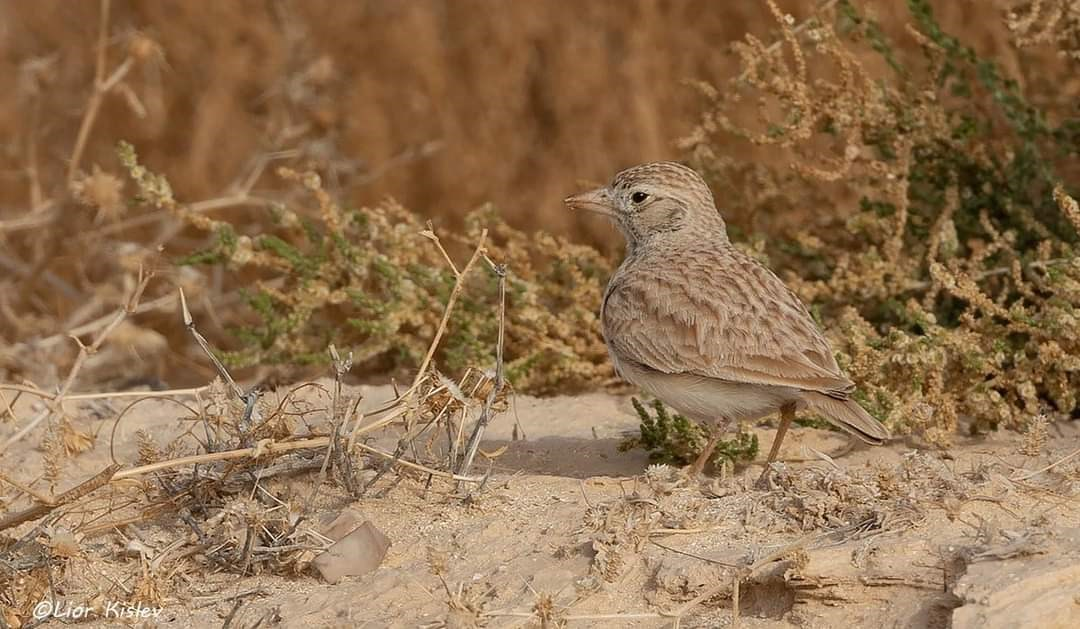
- Arabian Lark, Israel

Conservation status
- Least Concern (IUCN 3.1)

Scientific classification
- Kingdom: Animalia
- Phylum: Chordata
- Class: Aves
- Order: Passeriformes
- Family: Alaudidae
- Genus: Eremalauda
- Species: E. eremodites

Binomial name
- Eremalauda eremodites (Meinertzhagen, 1923)

= Arabian lark =

Species of bird

The Arabian lark (Eremalauda eremodites) is a small passerine bird of the lark family. It is a desert bird which is found from Syria to Jordan and through Saudi Arabia to Oman.

The Arabian lark was formerly considered conspecific with Dunn's lark, but was classified as a distinct species by the Handbook of the Birds of the World Alive and by Birdlife International, and later by the International Ornithological Congress. This species is monotypic.

== Description and Voice ==
The Arabian lark is a stocky, large-billed lark. Its upperparts are a plain sandy-brown and its underside is paler, marked with faint pale patterning and a dark moustache-like stripe on the face. The bill is bulbous and pinkish, and the outermost tail feathers are blackish, a feature most noticeable when the bird is in flight. On the ground it moves in short bursts, running and then stopping abruptly. Breeding birds are usually seen alone or in pairs, while outside the breeding season they may form small groups. Its song is a series of gentle burbling phrases given both from the ground and during a display flight, and its calls include a low rattle and a soft two-note whistle. Although it resembles other desert larks such as the desert lark and bar-tailed lark, the combination of more heavily streaked upperparts, black outer tail feathers, and a uniformly pink, swollen bill distinguishes it.
