= Čab =

Village in the Nitra District of western central Slovakia

Čab Csabb
- Municipality
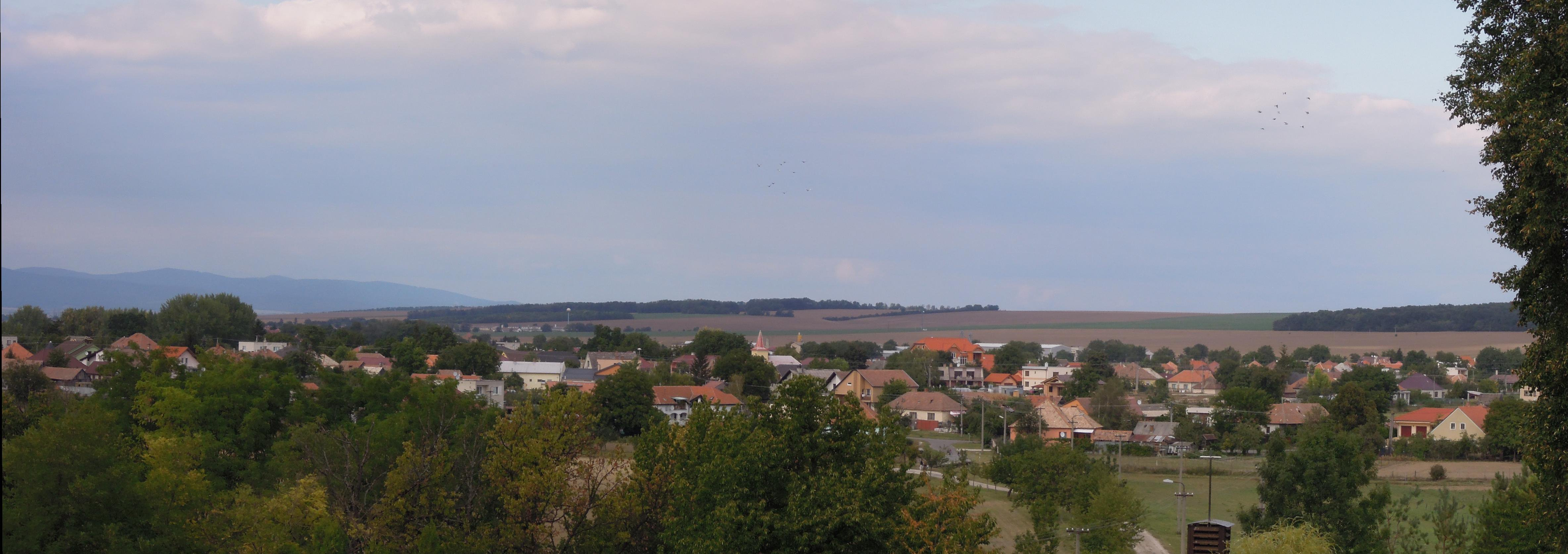
- Panorama of Čab

- Flag

- Location of Čab in the Nitra Region Location of Čab in Slovakia
- Coordinates: 48.40°N 17.98°E
- Country: Slovakia
- Region: Nitra Region
- District: Nitra District
- First mentioned: 1326

Area
  - Total: 0.00 km^{2} (0 sq mi)
- Elevation: 152 m (499 ft)

Population (2025)
  - Total: 757
- Time zone: UTC+1 (CET)
  - Summer (DST): UTC+2 (CEST)
- Postal code: 951 24
- Area code: +421 37
- Vehicle registration plate (until 2022): NR
- Website: www.obeccab.sk

Čab (Hungarian: Csabb) is a village and municipality in the Nitra District in western central Slovakia, in the Nitra Region.

== History ==
In historical records the village was first mentioned in 1326. It belonged to the Ludanický family in 1447 and was burned by the Ottoman Turks in 1601. A cholera outbreak killed 46 people in 1773, and the Baroque plague column built that year in the village centre is a cultural monument. The Chapel of Saints Cyril and Methodius was built in 1889.

== Geography ==
The municipality lies at an altitude of 152 metres (499 ft) and covers an area of 0.00 km^{2} (0 sq mi) (2025).

== Population ==
Population statistic (10 years)
Year	1995	2005	2015	2025
Count	0	724	793	757
Difference		–	+9.53%	−4.53%

Population statistic
Year	2024	2025
Count	769	757
Difference		−1.56%

It has a population of 757 people (31 December 2025).

=== Ethnicity ===
Census 2021 (1+%)
Ethnicity	Number	Fraction
Slovak	765	98.7%
Not found out	13	1.67%
Total	775	

In year 2021 was 775 people by ethnicity 765 as Slovak, 13 as Not found out, 2 as Czech, 2 as Hungarian, 2 as Croatian and 1 as Romanian.

Note on population: The difference values of population numbers in the table "Population statistic" and in the sections "Ethnicity" & "Religion" is caused by the use of various statistical methods.

=== Religion ===
Census 2021 (1+%)
Religion	Number	Fraction
Roman Catholic Church	593	76.52%
None	107	13.81%
Evangelical Church	56	7.23%
Total	775	

In year 2021 was 775 people by religion 593 from Roman Catholic Church, 107 from None, 56 from Evangelical Church, 6 from Not found out, 5 from Jehovah's Witnesses, 2 from Greek Catholic Church, 2 from Ad hoc movements, 1 from Calvinist Church, 1 from Paganism and natural spirituality, 1 from Christian Congregations in Slovakia and 1 from Buddhism.

== Facilities ==
The village has a public library.

== See also ==
- List of municipalities and towns in Slovakia

== Genealogical resources ==
The records for genealogical research are available at the state archive "Statny Archiv in Nitra, Slovakia".

- Roman Catholic church records (births/marriages/deaths): 1827–1896 (parish B)
