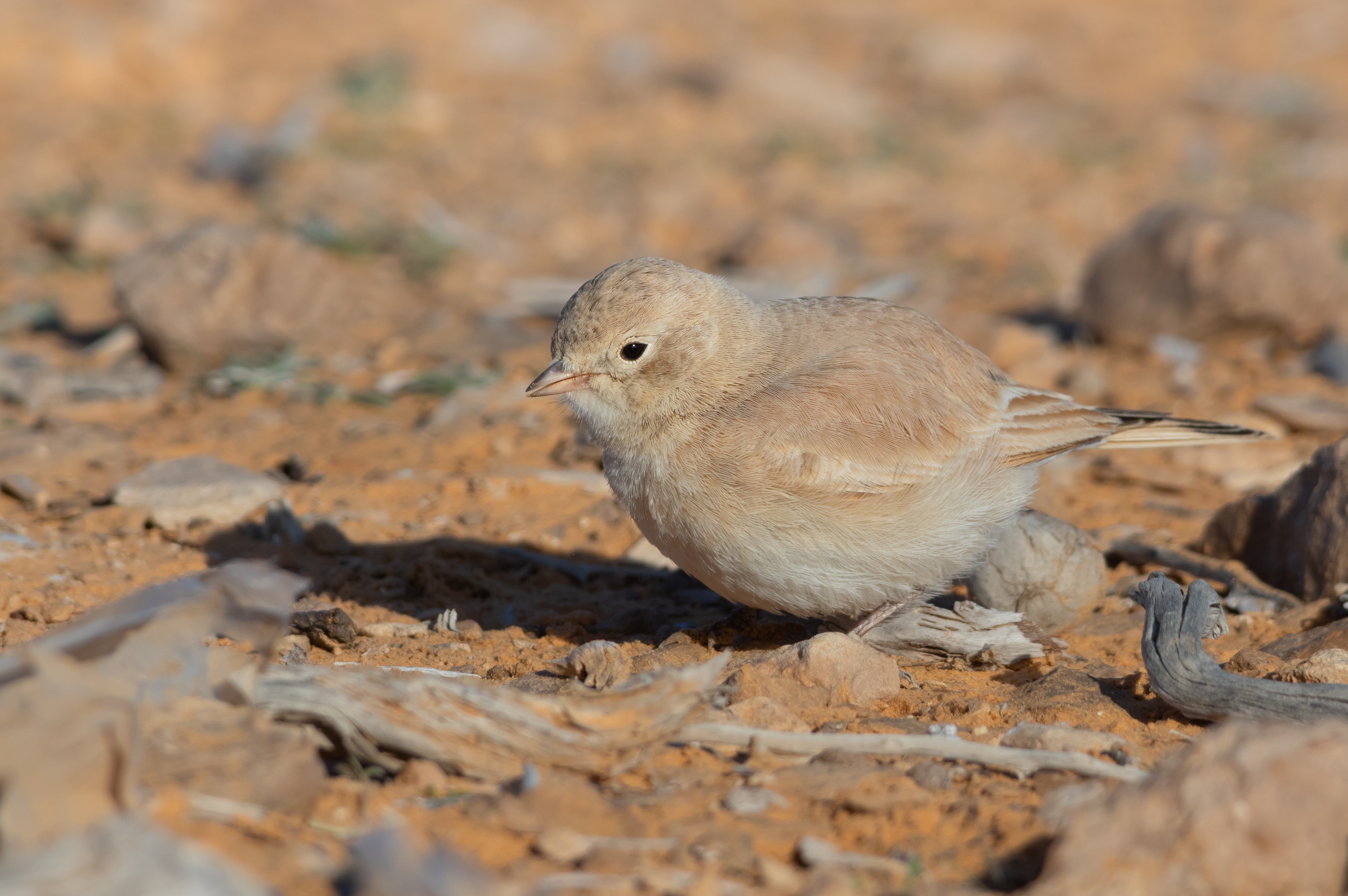
- At Jebil National Park, Tunisia

Conservation status
- Least Concern (IUCN 3.1)

Scientific classification
- Kingdom: Animalia
- Phylum: Chordata
- Class: Aves
- Order: Passeriformes
- Family: Alaudidae
- Genus: Ammomanes
- Species: A. cinctura

Binomial name
- Ammomanes cinctura (Gould, 1839)

Subspecies
- See text
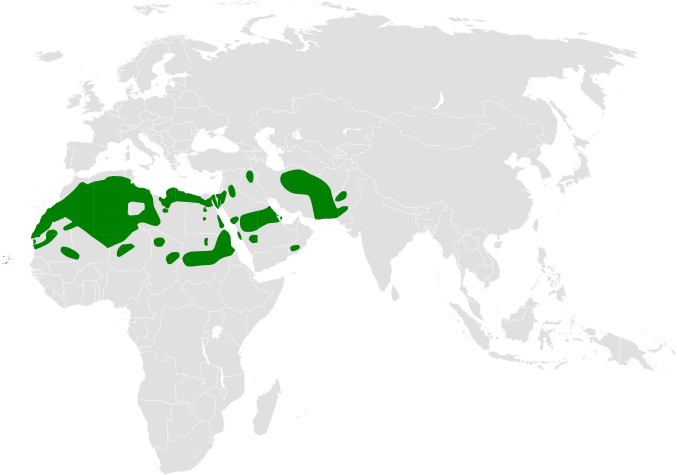

Synonyms
- Ammomanes cincturus; Ammomanes cinturus; Melanocorypha cinctura

= Bar-tailed lark =

Species of bird

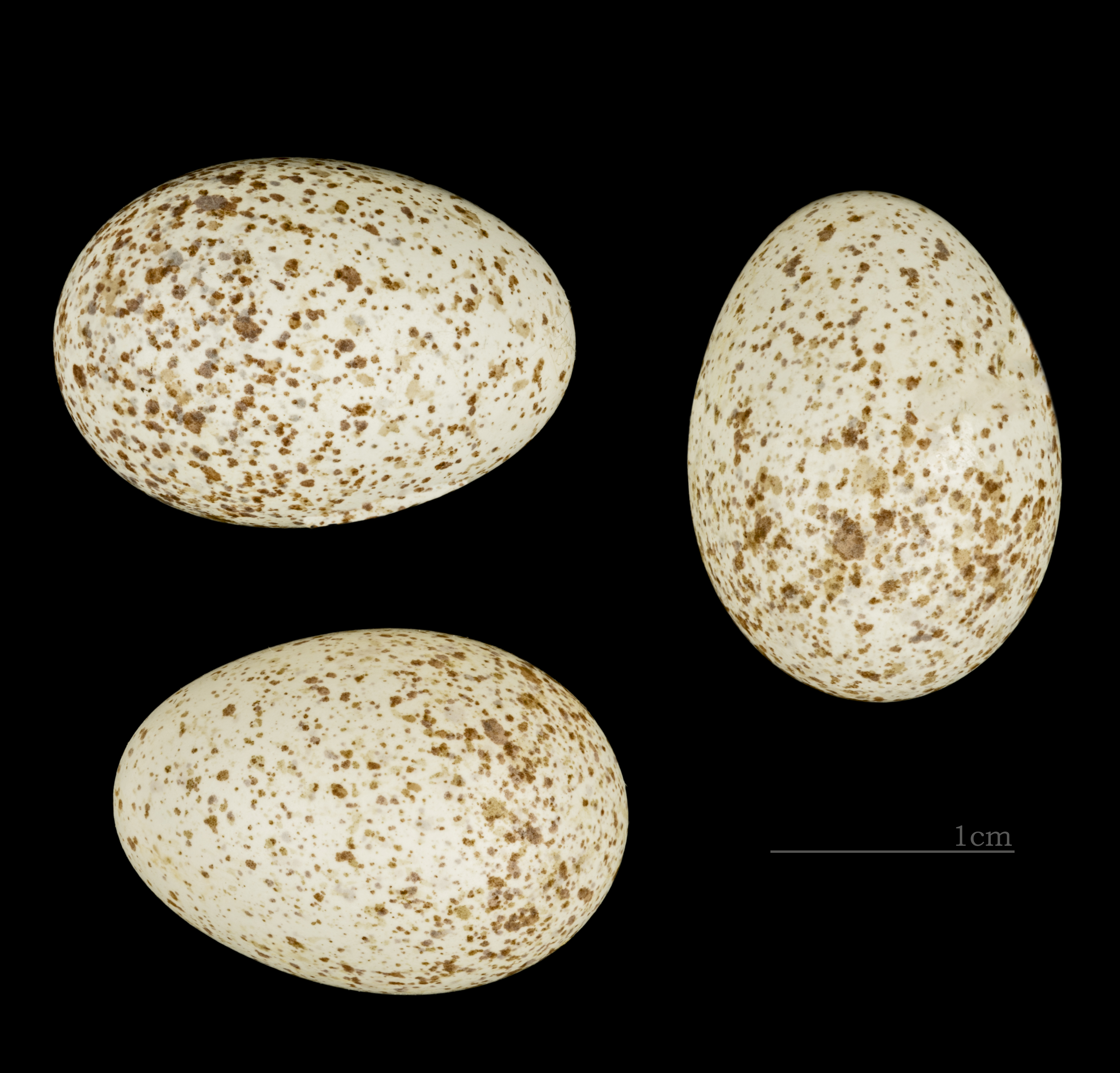
Eggs of Ammomanes cincturus arenicolor MHNT

The bar-tailed lark or bar-tailed desert lark (Ammomanes cinctura) is a species of lark in the family Alaudidae. Two other species, the rufous-tailed lark and the Cape clapper lark are both also sometimes referred to using the name bar-tailed lark. It is found from Morocco to Pakistan. Its natural habitat is hot deserts. This is in many places a common species, but elsewhere rather less common. It has a very wide distribution and faces no obvious threats, but surveys have shown that it is slowly decreasing in numbers. The International Union for Conservation of Nature has rated its conservation status as being of "least concern".

== Taxonomy and systematics ==
The bar-tailed lark was originally placed in the genus Melanocorypha. Alternate names for the bar-tailed lark include: bar-tailed finch-lark, black-tailed desert lark, black-tailed lark, and black-tailed sand lark.

=== Subspecies ===
Three subspecies are recognized:

- A. c. cinctura - (Gould, 1839): Found on Cape Verde Islands
- A. c. arenicolor - (Sundevall, 1850): Originally described as a separate species in the genus Alauda. Found in North African deserts to the Sinai Peninsula and western Arabia
- Persian rufous-tailed finch lark (A. c. zarudnyi) - Hartert, 1902: Found in eastern Iran, southern Afghanistan and southern Pakistan

== Description ==
The bar-tailed lark is similar to the desert lark in appearance, but at 14 to 15 cm (5.5 to 5.9 in), is slightly smaller, with a smaller, more domed head, a smaller beak, thinner legs and a shorter tail. The upper parts are sandy-buff washed with grey, while the underparts are whitish with little if any streaking, and the breast and flanks washed with buff. The rufous wings have dark trailing edges and the rufous tail has a terminal black band.

== Distribution and habitat ==
The bar-tailed lark has a large distribution across North Africa, the Arabian Peninsula, the Middle East and western Asia. Its range includes Afghanistan, Algeria, Bahrain, Cape Verde, Chad, Egypt, Iran, Iraq, Israel, Jordan, Kuwait, Libya, Mali, Mauritania, Morocco, Niger, Oman, Pakistan, Qatar, Saudi Arabia, Sudan, Syria, Tunisia, United Arab Emirates, Western Sahara and Yemen. Its typical habitat is sandy or stony desert or semi desert, with low scrubby vegetation. It is generally shier than the desert lark and has a preference for level ground whereas the desert lark tends to frequent rocky slopes and hillsides.
