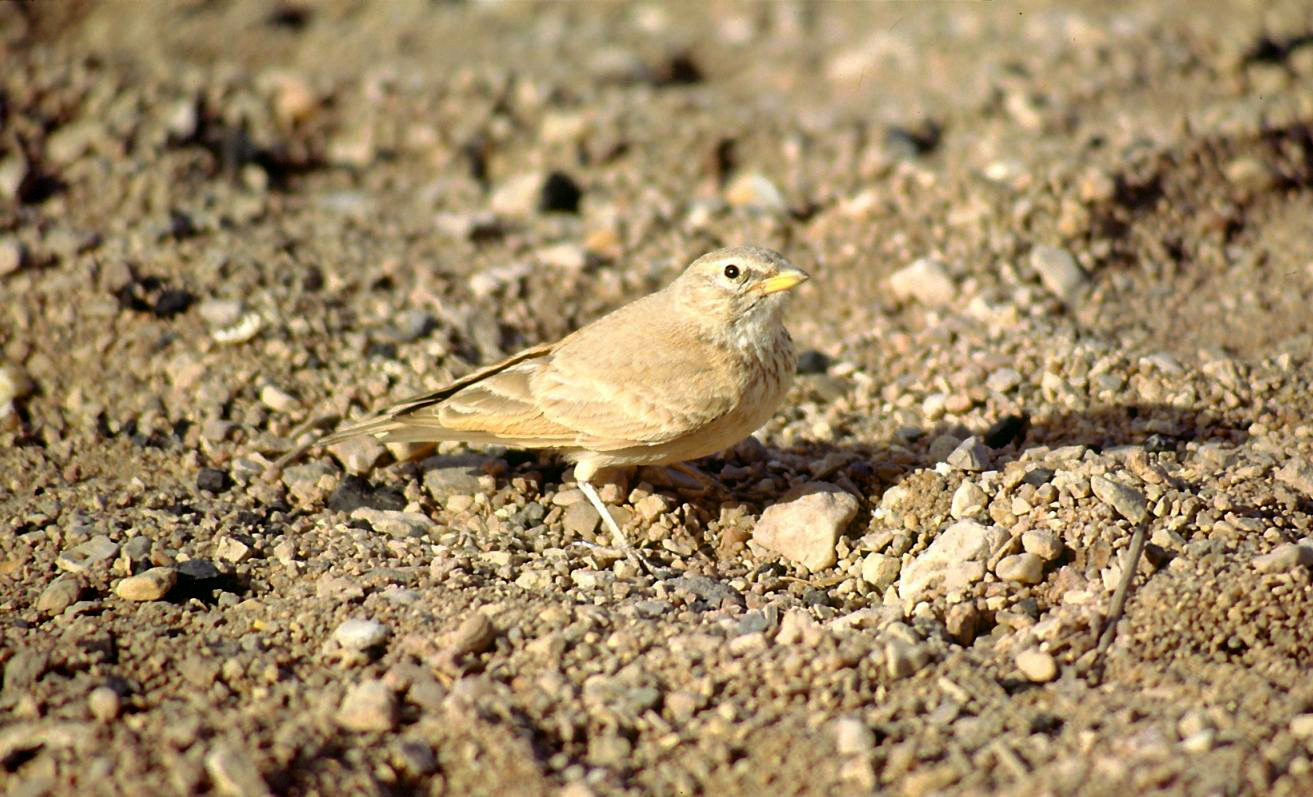
- A. d. isabellina in Palestine

Conservation status
- Least Concern (IUCN 3.1)

Scientific classification
- Kingdom: Animalia
- Phylum: Chordata
- Class: Aves
- Order: Passeriformes
- Family: Alaudidae
- Genus: Ammomanes
- Species: A. deserti

Binomial name
- Ammomanes deserti (Lichtenstein, MHC, 1823)

Subspecies
- See text
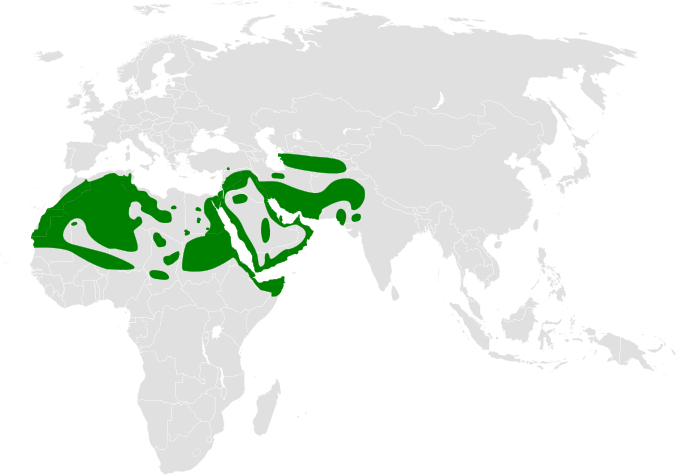
- range

Synonyms
- Alauda deserti

= Desert lark =

Species of bird

The desert lark (Ammomanes deserti) breeds in deserts and semi-deserts from Morocco to western India. It has a very wide distribution and faces no obvious threats, and surveys have shown that it is slowly increasing in numbers as it expands its range. The International Union for Conservation of Nature has rated its conservation status as being of "least concern".

== Taxonomy and systematics ==
Originally, the desert lark was classified as belonging to the genus Alauda until moved to Ammomanes. Alternate names include desert finch lark and sand lark.

=== Subspecies ===
Twenty-two subspecies are recognized:

- Southern Moroccan desert lark (A. d. payni) - Hartert, 1924: Found in southern Morocco and south-western Algeria
- Algerian desert lark or North Algerian desert lark (A. d. algeriensis) - Sharpe, 1890: Originally described as a separate species. Found in northern Algeria, Tunisia, north-western Libya and north-western Chad
- South Algerian desert lark (A. d. whitakeri) - Hartert, 1911: Found in south-eastern Algeria and south-western Libya
- Central Algerian desert lark or Saharan desert lark (A. d. mya) - Hartert, 1912: Found in central Algeria
- Damergu desert lark (A. d. geyri) - Hartert, 1924: Found in Mauritania to southern Algeria and north-western Niger
- A. d. kollmannspergeri - Niethammer, 1955: Found in north-eastern Chad and western Sudan
- Red Sea desert lark (A. d. deserti) - (Lichtenstein, 1823): Found from eastern Egypt to northern Sudan
- Khartoum desert lark (A. d. erythrochroa) - Reichenow, 1904: Found from western Chad to central Sudan
- Middle East desert lark or Sinai desert lark (A. d. isabellina) - (Temminck, 1823): Originally described as a separate species in the genus Alauda. Found from northern Egypt to southern Turkey, Syria, central Arabia, northern and south-western Iraq
- Eritrea desert lark (A. d. samharensis) - Shelley, 1902: Originally described as a separate species. Found in north-eastern Sudan, Eritrea and southern Arabia
- A. d. taimuri - Meyer de Schauensee & Ripley, 1953: Found in northern Oman and UAE
- Danakil desert lark (A. d. assabensis) - Salvadori, 1902: Originally described as a separate species. Found in southern Eritrea, Ethiopia and north-western Somalia
- Somali desert lark (A. d. akeleyi) - Elliot, DG, 1897: Originally described as a separate species. Found in northern Somalia
- A. d. azizi - Ticehurst & Cheesman, 1924: Found in east-central Arabia
- A. d. saturata - Ogilvie-Grant, 1900: Originally described as a separate species. Found in southern Arabia
- A. d. insularis - Ripley, 1951: Found in Bahrain
- Jordanian desert lark (A. d. annae) - Meinertzhagen, R, 1923: Found in Jordan and southern Syria
- Eastern Iraqi desert lark (A. d. cheesmani) - Meinertzhagen, R, 1923: Found in eastern Iraq and western Iran
- A. d. parvirostris - Hartert, 1890: Found in north-eastern Iran and western Turkmenistan
- A. d. orientalis - Zarudny & Loudon, 1904: Found in north-eastern Iran, northern Afghanistan, southern Turkmenistan, southern Uzbekistan and southern Tajikistan
- A. d. iranica - Zarudny, 1911: Found in central, southern, eastern Iran to southern Afghanistan and western Pakistan
- Indian desert finch-lark or Indian desert lark (A. d. phoenicuroides) - (Blyth, 1853): Originally described as a separate species in genus Mirafra. Found in south-eastern Afghanistan, eastern Pakistan and north-western India

== Description ==
The desert lark is a medium-sized, big-headed and long-billed lark, growing to a length of 16 to 17 cm (6.3 to 6.7 in). The sexes are alike, but there is considerable geographical variation. It has a rather dull plumage which can vary from quite pale to rather dark. Plumage may vary between subspecies but individuals within populations can be variable too. It is similar in appearance to the bar-tailed lark but is slightly larger, has a less-domed head, a larger broader beak, stouter legs and a longer tail. The upper parts of the many subspecies vary in colour; most are pale greyish brown, but some races are very washed out and others are quite a deep colour. Some have some rufous colour on wings and tail, similar to the bar-tailed lark, but the underparts are a pale pinkish grey and have much more streaking than that species, and the desert lark lacks the clearly defined terminal black band on the tail of that species, although it may have a rather diffuse dark patch. The colour variation seems to mainly match the habitat, so sandy-coloured birds are commoner in sandy areas, greyer birds in rocky areas and the darkest birds in desert dominated by basalt.

The song is a mournful choo-wee-chacha wooee, uttered from the ground or a boulder, or during undulating flight. It is more mellow and less squeaky than that of the bar-tailed lark. When flushed it utters a short churree or chee-lu.

== Distribution and habitat ==
The desert lark is found from Mauritania, Western Sahara and southern Morocco in the west east through northern Africa south to Chad and Somalia through south west Asia to western India.

It is resident (non-migratory) apart from local movements in arid stony areas, and avoids flat sand and will always be found in broken terrain with a vertical element to it.

== Behaviour and ecology ==
The desert lark is not very sociable and does not form large flocks, being mainly encountered in small groups or as single birds. They are territorial when breeding, nesting on the ground under the shelter of a tussock or stone in a shallow scrape lined with plant material and having a rim of pebbles, which may surround the nest or be on the more exposed side of the nest. The clutch is 1-5 eggs and these are laid at different times in various parts of its range, e.g. January–February in the south and March–April in the north. The desert lark eats seeds and insects, the latter especially in the breeding season.

== Gallery ==
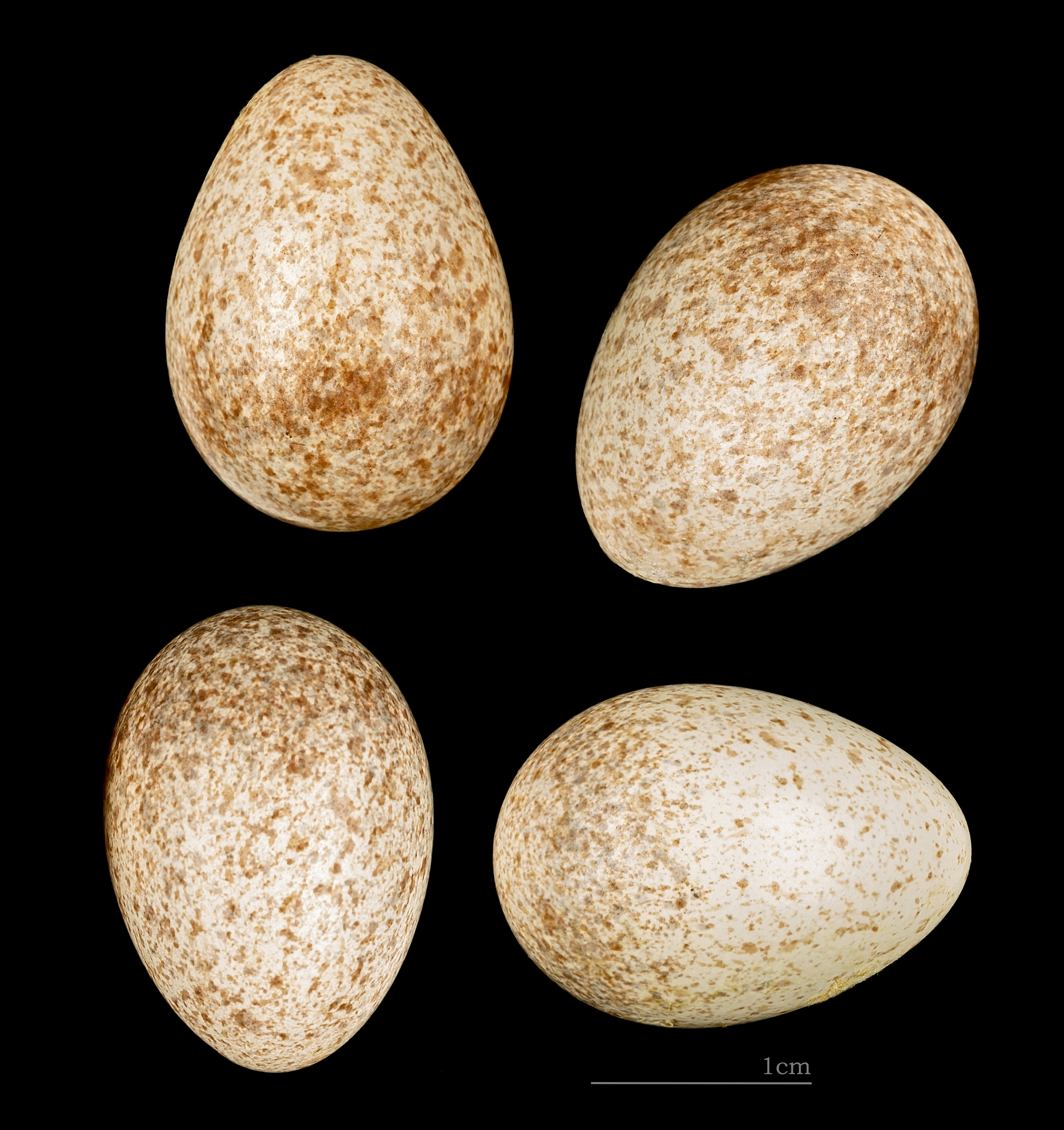
Eggs of A. d. algeriensis MHNT

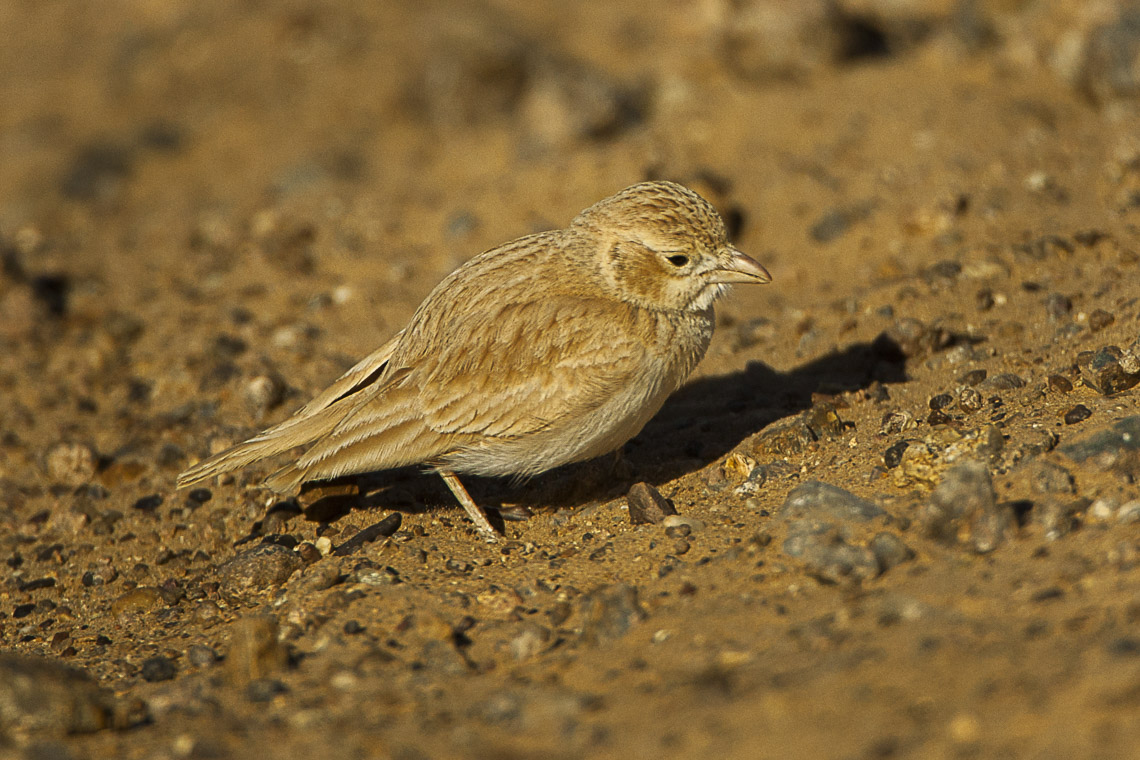
A. d. payni in Morocco

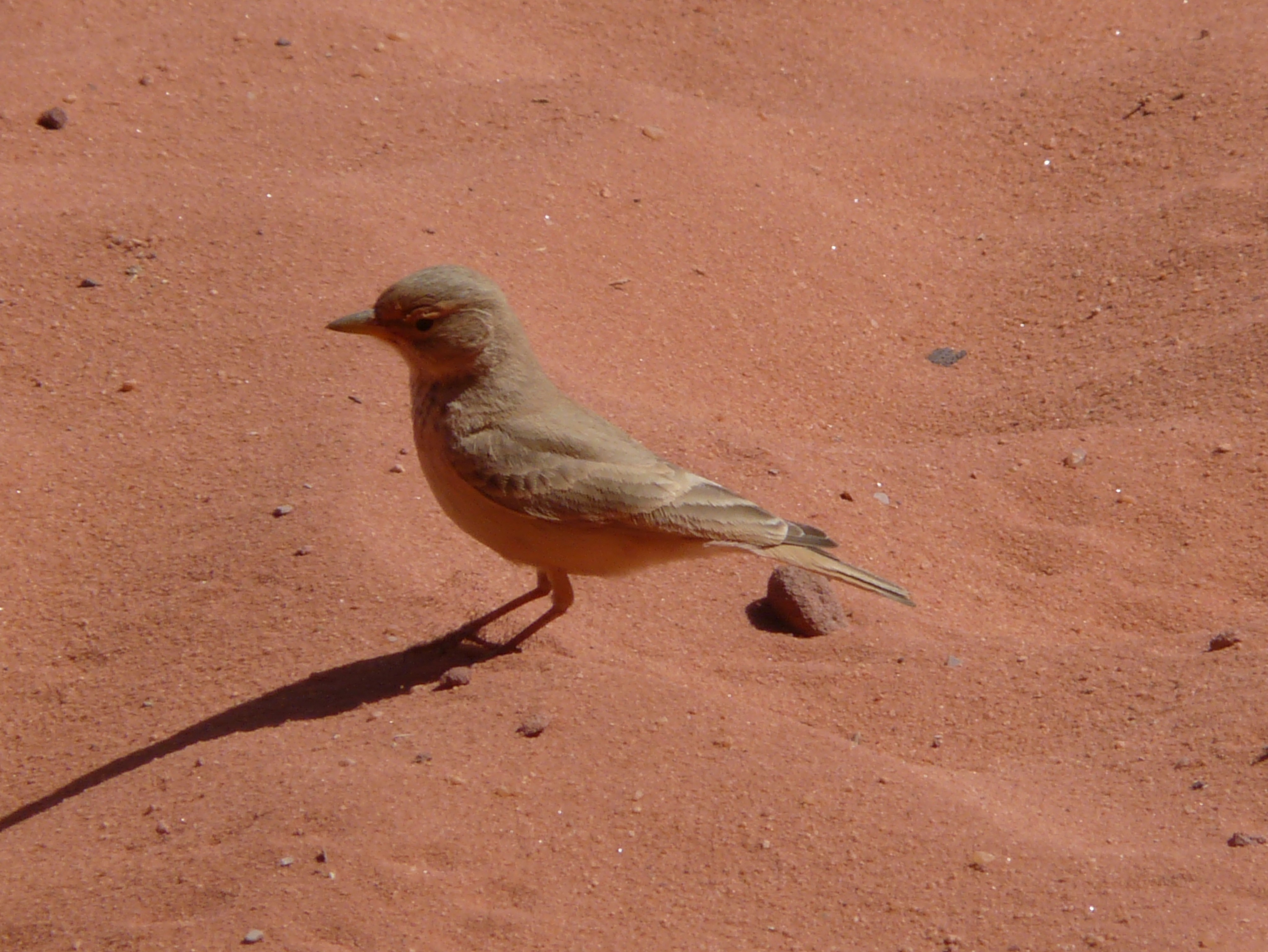
A. d. annae in Wadi Rum, Jordan
