= Committee Against Bird Slaughter =

German non-governmental organization

- Formation: 1975
- Founded at: Germany
- Purpose: Animal Rights
- Website: www.komitee.de/en/

The Committee Against Bird Slaughter (CABS) is an NGO established in 1975 in Germany to advocate against the illegal poaching of migratory birds in Europe. They claim to be the only organization in Europe with this specialization. They aid in removing traps, monitoring hunters, lobbying parliament on issues, and supporting relevant police efforts. In collaboration with other organizations CABS they have bird protection camps around hotspots of poaching.

== 1970–2000s ==
A small group of bird conservationists were inspired by circulating bird poaching photos in the 1970s, and established CABS in 1975. They created a campaign called "No vacation where birds are murdered" to hinder tourism in areas in Italy that had large amounts of bird hunting. Further campaigns ensued and over the years numerous bird species gained governmental protections and the EU Birds Directive due to the actions of CABS and similar groups. In 1980 they launched a campaign against bird trapping in Belgium and pigeon shooting competitions in Florence. Such protests led to bans and regulations placed in 1984. The early 80's carried a focus on wild bird trade in Germany through covert monitoring in underground trading. Illegal bird farms were closed down after a CABS advertising campaign upon discovery.

== 2000s–present ==
There are instances such as one in 2017 where members of CABS have been violently attacked by hunters.

Starting in 2017 CABS in congregation with the Society for the Protection of Nature in Lebanon lobbied Lebanon's government for stricter anti-poaching laws.

In August 2019 CABS discovered eight illegal underwater bird trapping sites through a major reconnaissance operation.

Due to reduced police resources during the 2020 Coronavirus pandemic, CABS has had reduced effectivity on a surge in poachers. They had to close down most bird protection camps and operations.
