= List of birds of Jinja =

This list of birds of Jinja details the avifauna of the Jinja District of Uganda.

The Jinja District is in the Eastern Region of Uganda and has the second largest economy in the country. The city of Jinja is on the shore of Lake Victoria, which leads into the Nile river.

There are 583 different species of birds in Jinja as of October 2019 according to Bird Checklists of the World. Of these, 13 species are globally threatened and two are introduced species.

The common and scientific names of species and their sequence are those of the Howard and Moore taxonomy, 4th edition.

== Anseriformes: Anatidae ==
- White-faced whistling duck, Dendrocygna viduata
- Fulvous whistling duck, Dendrocygna bicolor
- Egyptian goose, Alopochen aegyptiaca
- Southern pochard, Netta erythrophthalma
- Garganey, Spatula querquedula
- Blue-billed teal, Spatula hottentota
- Eurasian wigeon, Mareca penelope
- African black duck, Anas sparsa
- Yellow-billed duck, Anas undulata
- Red-billed teal, Anas erythrorhyncha
- Northern pintail, Anas acuta
- Common teal, Anas crecca
- White-backed duck, Thalassornis leuconotus
- Spur-winged goose, Plectropterus gambensis
- Comb duck, Sarkidiornis melanotos
- African pygmy goose, Nettapus auritus

== Galliformes: Numididae ==
- Helmeted guineafowl, Numida meleagris
- Crested guineafowl, Guttera pucherani

== Galliformes: Phasianidae ==
- Common quail, Coturnix coturnix
- Harlequin quail, Coturnix delegorguei
- Blue quail, Synoicus adansonii
- Scaly francolin, Pternistis squamatus
- Crested francolin, Dendroperdix sephaena
- Forest francolin, Peliperdix lathami

== Phoenicopteriformes: Podicipedidae ==
- Little grebe, Tachybaptus ruficollis

== Columbiformes: Columbidae ==
- Speckled pigeon, Columba guinea
- Afep pigeon, Columba unicincta
- Lemon dove, Aplopelia larvata
- Mourning collared dove, Streptopelia decipiens
- Red-eyed dove, Streptopelia semitorquata
- Ring-necked dove, Streptopelia capicola
- Vinaceous dove, Streptopelia vinacea
- Laughing dove, Streptopelia senegalensis
- Bruce's green pigeon, Treron waalia
- African green pigeon, Treron calvus
- Blue-spotted wood dove, Turtur afer
- Tambourine dove, Turtur tympanistria
- Namaqua dove, Oena capensis

== Caprimulgiformes: Caprimulgidae ==
- European nightjar, Caprimulgus europaeus
- Fiery-necked nightjar, Caprimulgus pectoralis
- Swamp nightjar, Caprimulgus natalensis
- Plain nightjar, Caprimulgus inornatus
- Freckled nightjar, Caprimulgus tristigma
- Long-tailed nightjar, Caprimulgus climacurus
- Slender-tailed nightjar, Caprimulgus clarus
- Standard-winged nightjar, Caprimulgus longipennis
- Pennant-winged nightjar, Caprimulgus vexillarius

== Apodiformes: Apodidae ==
- Mottled spinetailed swift, Telacanthura ussheri
- Sabine's spinetailed swift, Rhaphidura sabini
- Cassin's spinetailed swift, Neafrapus cassini
- Scarce swift, Schoutedenapus myoptilus
- African palm swift, Cypsiurus parvus
- Alpine swift, Tachymarptis melba
- White-rumped swift, Apus caffer
- Little swift, Apus affinis
- African swift, Apus barbatus
- Common swift, Apus apus

== Cuculiformes: Cuculidae ==
- Senegal coucal, Centropus senegalensis
- Blue-headed coucal, Centropus monachus
- White-browed coucal, Centropus superciliosus
- African black coucal, Centropus grillii
- Yellowbill, Ceuthmochares aereus
- Jacobin cuckoo, Clamator jacobinus
- Levaillant's cuckoo, Clamator levaillantii
- Great spotted cuckoo, Clamator glandarius
- Klaas's cuckoo, Chrysococcyx klaas
- African emerald cuckoo, Chrysococcyx cupreus
- Diederick cuckoo, Chrysococcyx caprius
- Dusky long-tailed cuckoo, Cercococcyx mechowi
- Red-chested cuckoo, Cuculus solitarius
- Black cuckoo, Cuculus clamosus
- Common cuckoo, Cuculus canorus
- African cuckoo, Cuculus gularis
- Madagascar cuckoo, Cuculus rochii

== Gruiformes: Rallidae ==
- African rail, Rallus caerulescens
- African crake, Crex egregia
- Corncrake, Crex crex
- Spotted crake, Porzana porzana
- Black crake, Zapornia flavirostra
- Baillon's crake, Zapornia pusilla
- Striped crake, Amaurornis marginalis
- Purple swamphen, Porphyrio porphyrio
- Allen's gallinule, Porphyrio alleni
- Common moorhen, Gallinula chloropus
- Lesser moorhen, Gallinula angulata
- Red-knobbed coot, Fulica cristata

== Gruiformes: Sarothruridae ==
- White-spotted flufftail, Sarothrura pulchra
- Buff-spotted flufftail, Sarothrura elegans
- Red-chested flufftail, Sarothrura rufa

== Gruiformes: Heliornithidae ==
- African finfoot, Podica senegalensis

== Gruiformes: Gruidae ==
- Grey crowned crane, Balearica regulorum

== Otidiformes: Otididae ==
- Black-bellied bustard, Lissotis melanogaster

== Musophagiformes: Musophagidae ==
- Great blue turaco, Corythaeola cristata
- Eastern grey plantain-eater, Crinifer zonurus
- Black-billed turaco, Tauraco schuettii
- White-crested turaco, Tauraco leucolophus
- Ross's turaco, Tauraco rossae

== Pelecaniformes: Ciconiidae ==
- Marabou, Leptoptilos crumenifer
- Yellow-billed stork, Mycteria ibis
- African openbill, Anastomus lamelligerus
- Black stork, Ciconia nigra
- Abdim's stork, Ciconia abdimii
- Woolly-necked stork, Ciconia episcopus
- European white stork, Ciconia ciconia
- Saddle-bill stork, Ephippiorhynchus senegalensis

== Pelecaniformes: Pelecanidae ==
- Great white pelican, Pelecanus onocrotalus
- Pink-backed pelican, Pelecanus rufescens

== Pelecaniformes: Scopidae ==
- Hamerkop, Scopus umbretta

== Pelecaniformes: Balaenicipitidae ==
- Shoebill, Balaeniceps rex

== Pelecaniformes: Ardeidae ==
- Little bittern, Ixobrychus minutus
- Dwarf bittern, Ixobrychus sturmii
- Black-crowned night heron, Nycticorax nycticorax
- Striated heron, Butorides striata
- Squacco heron, Ardeola ralloides
- Madagascar pond heron, Ardeola idae
- Rufous-bellied heron, Ardeola rufiventris
- Cattle egret, Bubulcus ibis
- Grey heron, Ardea cinerea
- Black-headed heron, Ardea melanocephala
- Goliath heron, Ardea goliath
- Purple heron, Ardea purpurea
- Great egret, Ardea alba
- Intermediate egret, Ardea intermedia
- Black heron, Egretta ardesiaca
- Little egret, Egretta garzetta

== Pelecaniformes: Threskiornithidae ==
- African sacred ibis, Threskiornis aethiopicus
- African spoonbill, Platalea alba
- Hadada ibis, Bostrychia hagedash
- Glossy ibis, Plegadis falcinellus

== Pelecaniformes: Phalacrocoracidae ==
- Long-tailed cormorant, Microcarbo africanus
- Great cormorant, Phalacrocorax carbo

== Pelecaniformes: Anhingidae ==
- African darter, Anhinga rufa

== Charadriiformes: Burhinidae ==
- Water thick-knee, Burhinus vermiculatus

== Charadriiformes: Recurvirostridae ==
- Pied avocet, Recurvirostra avosetta
- Black-winged stilt, Himantopus himantopus

== Charadriiformes: Charadriidae ==
- Common ringed plover, Charadrius hiaticula
- Little ringed plover, Charadrius dubius
- Kittlitz's plover, Charadrius pecuarius
- Three-banded plover, Charadrius tricollaris
- Caspian plover, Charadrius asiaticus
- Long-toed lapwing, Vanellus crassirostris
- Spur-winged lapwing, Vanellus spinosus
- Senegal lapwing, Vanellus lugubris
- African wattled lapwing, Vanellus senegallus
- Brown-chested lapwing, Vanellus superciliosus

== Charadriiformes: Rostratulidae ==
- Greater painted-snipe, Rostratula benghalensis

== Charadriiformes: Jacanidae ==
- African jacana, Actophilornis africanus
- Lesser jacana, Microparra capensis

== Charadriiformes: Scolopacidae ==
- Whimbrel, Numenius phaeopus
- Eurasian curlew, Numenius arquata
- Black-tailed godwit, Limosa limosa
- Ruff, Calidris pugnax
- Curlew sandpiper, Calidris ferruginea
- Temminck's stint, Calidris temminckii
- Little stint, Calidris minuta
- Great snipe, Gallinago media
- Common snipe, Gallinago gallinago
- Jack snipe, Lymnocryptes minimus
- Common sandpiper, Actitis hypoleucos
- Green sandpiper, Tringa ochropus
- Spotted redshank, Tringa erythropus
- Common greenshank, Tringa nebularia
- Common redshank, Tringa totanus
- Wood sandpiper, Tringa glareola
- Marsh sandpiper, Tringa stagnatilis

== Charadriiformes: Turnicidae ==
- Common buttonquail, Turnix sylvaticus

== Charadriiformes: Glareolidae ==
- Bronze-winged courser, Rhinoptilus chalcopterus
- Temminck's courser, Cursorius temminckii
- Collared pratincole, Glareola pratincola
- Rock pratincole, Glareola nuchalis

== Charadriiformes: Laridae ==
- African skimmer, Rynchops flavirostris
- Black-headed gull, Chroicocephalus ridibundus
- Gray-hooded gull, Chroicocephalus cirrocephalus
- Lesser black-backed gull, Larus fuscus
- Gull-billed tern, Gelochelidon nilotica
- Caspian tern, Hydroprogne caspia
- Whiskered tern, Chlidonias hybrida
- White-winged tern, Chlidonias leucopterus
- Black tern, Chlidonias niger

== Accipitriformes: Sagittariidae ==
- Secretary-bird, Sagittarius serpentarius

== Accipitriformes: Pandionidae ==
- Osprey, Pandion haliaetus

== Accipitriformes: Accipitridae ==
- Black-winged kite, Elanus caeruleus
- Scissor-tailed kite, Chelictinia riocourii
- European honey buzzard, Pernis apivorus
- African cuckoo hawk, Aviceda cuculoides
- African harrier hawk, Polyboroides typus
- Palm-nut vulture, Gypohierax angolensis
- Bateleur, Terathopius ecaudatus
- Black-chested snake eagle, Circaetus pectoralis
- Brown snake eagle, Circaetus cinereus
- Western banded snake eagle, Circaetus cinerascens
- White-headed vulture, Trigonoceps occipitalis
- Hooded vulture, Necrosyrtes monachus
- White-backed vulture, Gyps africanus
- Rüppell's vulture, Gyps rueppelli
- Bat hawk, Macheiramphus alcinus
- Martial eagle, Polemaetus bellicosus
- Long-crested eagle, Lophaetus occipitalis
- Tawny eagle, Aquila rapax
- Steppe eagle, Aquila nipalensis
- African hawk eagle, Aquila spilogaster
- Cassin's hawk eagle, Aquila africana
- Wahlberg's eagle, Hieraaetus wahlbergi
- Ayres's eagle, Hieraaetus ayresii
- Lizard buzzard, Kaupifalco monogrammicus
- Dark chanting goshawk, Melierax metabates
- Gabar goshawk, Micronisus gabar
- Western marsh harrier, Circus aeruginosus
- African marsh harrier, Circus ranivorus
- Pallid harrier, Circus macrourus
- Montagu's harrier, Circus pygargus
- African goshawk, Accipiter tachiro
- Shikra, Accipiter badius
- Little sparrowhawk, Accipiter minullus
- Ovambo sparrowhawk, Accipiter ovampensis
- Black sparrowhawk, Accipiter melanoleucus
- African fish eagle, Haliaeetus vocifer
- Black kite, Milvus migrans
- Augur buzzard, Buteo augur
- Eurasian buzzard, Buteo buteo
- Long-legged buzzard, Buteo rufinus

== Strigiformes: Tytonidae ==
- Common barn owl, Tyto alba

== Strigiformes: Strigidae ==
- Pearl-spotted owlet, Glaucidium perlatum
- African scops owl, Otus senegalensis
- Southern white-faced owl, Ptilopsis granti
- Marsh owl, Asio capensis
- African wood owl, Strix woodfordii
- Spotted eagle owl, Bubo africanus
- Verreaux's eagle owl, Bubo lacteus

== Coliiformes: Coliidae ==
- Speckled mousebird, Colius striatus
- Blue-naped mousebird, Urocolius macrourus

== Trogoniformes: Trogonidae ==
- Narina's trogon, Apaloderma narina

== Bucerotiformes: Bucerotidae ==
- Northern ground hornbill, Bucorvus abyssinicus
- Crowned hornbill, Tockus alboterminatus
- African pied hornbill, Tockus fasciatus
- African grey hornbill, Tockus nasutus
- White-thighed hornbill, Bycanistes albotibialis
- Grey-cheeked hornbill, Bycanistes subcylindricus

== Bucerotiformes: Upupidae ==
- Common hoopoe, Upupa epops

== Bucerotiformes: Phoeniculidae ==
- Green wood-hoopoe, Phoeniculus purpureus
- White-headed wood-hoopoe, Phoeniculus bollei
- Forest wood-hoopoe, Phoeniculus castaneiceps
- Common scimitarbill, Rhinopomastus cyanomelas

== Piciformes: Indicatoridae ==
- Cassin's honeybird, Prodotiscus insignis
- Least honeyguide, Indicator exilis
- Lesser honeyguide, Indicator minor
- Scaly-throated honeyguide, Indicator variegatus
- Greater honeyguide, Indicator indicator

== Piciformes: Picidae ==
- Northern wryneck, Jynx torquilla
- Nubian woodpecker, Campethera nubica
- Green-backed woodpecker, Campethera cailliautii
- Buff-spotted woodpecker, Campethera nivosa
- Brown-eared woodpecker, Campethera caroli
- Speckle-breasted woodpecker, Dendropicos poecilolaemus
- Cardinal woodpecker, Dendropicos fuscescens
- Bearded woodpecker, Chloropicus namaquus
- Yellow-crested woodpecker, Chloropicus xantholophus
- Grey woodpecker, Mesopicos goertae

== Piciformes: Ramphastidae ==
- Yellow-spotted barbet, Buccanodon duchaillui
- Grey-throated barbet, Gymnobucco bonapartei
- Speckled tinkerbird, Pogoniulus scolopaceus
- Yellow-throated tinkerbird, Pogoniulus subsulphureus
- Yellow-rumped tinkerbird, Pogoniulus bilineatus
- Yellow-fronted tinkerbird, Pogoniulus chrysoconus
- Hairy-breasted barbet, Tricholaema hirsuta
- Spot-flanked barbet, Tricholaema lacrymosa
- White-headed barbet, Lybius leucocephalus
- Black-billed barbet, Lybius guifsobalito
- Double-toothed barbet, Pogonornis bidentatus
- Yellow-billed barbet, Trachylaemus purpuratus

== Coraciiformes: Meropidae ==
- White-fronted bee-eater, Merops bullockoides
- Red-throated bee-eater, Merops bulocki
- White-throated bee-eater, Merops albicollis
- Olive bee-eater, Merops superciliosus
- Blue-cheeked bee-eater, Merops persicus
- Swallow-tailed bee-eater, Merops hirundineus
- Blue-breasted bee-eater, Merops variegatus
- Little bee-eater, Merops pusillus

== Coraciiformes: Coraciidae ==
- Rufous-crowned roller, Coracias naevius
- Lilac-breasted roller, Coracias caudatus
- Abyssinian roller, Coracias abyssinicus
- European roller, Coracias garrulus
- Blue-throated roller, Eurystomus gularis
- Broad-billed roller, Eurystomus glaucurus

== Coraciiformes: Alcedinidae ==
- African dwarf kingfisher, Ispidina lecontei
- African pygmy kingfisher, Ispidina picta
- White-bellied kingfisher, Corythornis leucogaster
- African malachite kingfisher, Corythornis cristatus
- Shining-blue kingfisher, Alcedo quadribrachys
- Giant kingfisher, Megaceryle maxima
- Pied kingfisher, Ceryle rudis
- Chocolate-backed kingfisher, Halcyon badia
- Grey-headed kingfisher, Halcyon leucocephala
- Striped kingfisher, Halcyon chelicuti
- Blue-breasted kingfisher, Halcyon malimbica
- Woodland kingfisher, Halcyon senegalensis

== Falconiformes: Falconidae ==
- Lesser kestrel, Falco naumanni
- Common kestrel, Falco tinnunculus
- Grey kestrel, Falco ardosiaceus
- Red-necked falcon, Falco chicquera
- Red-footed falcon, Falco vespertinus
- Amur falcon, Falco amurensis
- Eurasian hobby, Falco subbuteo
- African hobby, Falco cuvierii
- Lanner falcon, Falco biarmicus
- Peregrine falcon, Falco peregrinus

== Psittaciformes: Psittacidae ==
- Grey parrot, Psittacus erithacus
- Brown-necked parrot, Poicephalus robustus
- Brown parrot, Poicephalus meyeri

== Psittaciformes: Psittaculidae ==
- Red-headed lovebird, Agapornis pullarius

== Passeriformes: Pittidae ==
- African pitta, Pitta angolensis

== Passeriformes: Calyptomenidae ==
- African broadbill, Smithornis capensis

== Passeriformes: Campephagidae ==
- White-breasted cuckooshrike, Ceblepyris pectoralis
- Black cuckooshrike, Campephaga flava
- Red-shouldered cuckooshrike, Campephaga phoenicea
- Purple-throated cuckooshrike, Campephaga quiscalina

== Passeriformes: Oriolidae ==
- Western black-headed oriole, Oriolus brachyrynchus
- Eastern black-headed oriole, Oriolus larvatus
- Mountain oriole, Oriolus percivali
- Eurasian golden oriole, Oriolus oriolus
- African golden oriole, Oriolus auratus

== Passeriformes: Platysteiridae ==
- Chinspot batis, Batis molitor
- Von Erlanger's batis, Batis erlangeri
- Chestnut wattle-eye, Dyaphorophyia castanea
- Jameson's wattle-eye, Dyaphorophyia jamesoni
- Brown-throated wattle-eye, Platysteira cyanea
- Black-throated wattle-eye, Platysteira peltata

== Passeriformes: Vangidae ==
- Red-eyed shrike-flycatcher, Megabyas flammulatus
- Black-and-white shrike-flycatcher, Bias musicus

== Passeriformes: Malaconotidae ==
- Grey-headed bush-shrike, Malaconotus blanchoti
- Northern puffback, Dryoscopus gambensis
- Blackcap bush-shrike, Bocagia minuta
- Brown-crowned tchagra, Tchagra australis
- Black-crowned tchagra, Tchagra senegalus
- Brubru, Nilaus afer
- Grey-green bush-shrike, Chlorophoneus bocagei
- Orange-breasted bush-shrike, Chlorophoneus sulfureopectus
- Lowland sooty boubou, Laniarius leucorhynchus
- Lühder's bush-shrike, Laniarius luehderi
- Tropical boubou, Laniarius aethiopicus
- Black-headed gonolek, Laniarius erythrogaster
- Papyrus gonolek, Laniarius mufumbiri

== Passeriformes: Dicruridae ==
- Fork-tailed drongo, Dicrurus adsimilis
- Velvet-mantled drongo, Dicrurus modestus

== Passeriformes: Laniidae ==
- Red-backed shrike, Lanius collurio
- Turkestan shrike, Lanius phoenicuroides
- Isabelline shrike, Lanius isabellinus
- Mackinnon's shrike, Lanius mackinnoni
- Lesser grey shrike, Lanius minor
- Grey-backed fiscal, Lanius excubitoroides
- Northern fiscal, Lanius humeralis

== Passeriformes: Corvidae ==
- Piapiac, Ptilostomus afer
- White-necked raven, Corvus albicollis
- Pied crow, Corvus albus

== Passeriformes: Monarchidae ==
- Blue-headed paradise-flycatcher, Trochocercus nitens
- African paradise-flycatcher, Terpsiphone viridis
- Red-bellied paradise-flycatcher, Terpsiphone rufiventer

== Passeriformes: Nectariniidae ==
- Fraser's sunbird, Deleornis fraseri
- Little green sunbird, Anthreptes seimundi
- Grey-chinned sunbird, Anthreptes rectirostris
- Collared sunbird, Hedydipna collaris
- Green-headed sunbird, Cyanomitra verticalis
- Blue-throated brown sunbird, Cyanomitra cyanolaema
- Olive sunbird, Cyanomitra olivacea
- Green-throated sunbird, Chalcomitra rubescens
- Scarlet-chested sunbird, Chalcomitra senegalensis
- Bronzy sunbird, Nectarinia kilimensis
- Golden-winged sunbird, Drepanorhynchus reichenowi
- Olive-bellied sunbird, Cinnyris chloropygius
- Tiny sunbird, Cinnyris minullus
- Mariqua sunbird, Cinnyris mariquensis
- Red-chested sunbird, Cinnyris erythrocercus
- Purple-banded sunbird, Cinnyris bifasciatus
- Orange-tufted sunbird, Cinnyris bouvieri
- Superb sunbird, Cinnyris superbus
- Variable sunbird, Cinnyris venustus
- Copper sunbird, Cinnyris cupreus

== Passeriformes: Ploceidae ==
- Grosbeak weaver, Amblyospiza albifrons
- Cardinal quelea, Quelea cardinalis
- Red-billed quelea, Quelea quelea
- Black bishop, Euplectes gierowii
- Black-winged bishop, Euplectes hordeaceus
- Yellow-mantled widowbird, Euplectes macroura
- Fan-tailed widowbird, Euplectes axillaris
- White-winged widowbird, Euplectes albonotatus
- Hartlaub's widowbird, Euplectes hartlaubi
- Baglafecht weaver, Ploceus baglafecht
- Slender-billed weaver, Ploceus pelzelni
- Little weaver, Ploceus luteolus
- Spectacled weaver, Ploceus ocularis
- Black-necked weaver, Ploceus nigricollis
- Black-billed weaver, Ploceus melanogaster
- Holub's weaver, Ploceus xanthops
- Orange weaver, Ploceus aurantius
- Northern brown-throated weaver, Ploceus castanops
- Lesser masked weaver, Ploceus intermedius
- Vitelline masked weaver, Ploceus vitellinus
- Village weaver, Ploceus cucullatus
- Vieillot's weaver, Ploceus nigerrimus
- Weyns's weaver, Ploceus weynsi
- Black-headed weaver, Ploceus melanocephalus
- Golden-backed weaver, Ploceus jacksoni
- Yellow-mantled weaver, Ploceus tricolor
- Compact weaver, Ploceus superciliosus
- Red-headed malimbe, Malimbus rubricollis
- Red-headed weaver, Anaplectes rubriceps

== Passeriformes: Estrildidae ==
- Black-bellied firefinch, Lagonosticta rara
- Bar-breasted firefinch, Lagonosticta rufopicta
- Red-billed firefinch, Lagonosticta senegala
- African firefinch, Lagonosticta rubricata
- Brown twinspot, Clytospiza monteiri
- Red-cheeked cordon-bleu, Uraeginthus bengalus
- Red-headed bluebill, Spermophaga ruficapilla
- Black-bellied seedcracker, Pyrenestes ostrinus
- Fawn-breasted waxbill, Estrilda paludicola
- Common waxbill, Estrilda astrild
- Black-crowned waxbill, Estrilda nonnula
- Green-backed twinspot, Mandingoa nitidula
- White-breasted negrofinch, Nigrita fusconotus
- Grey-headed negrofinch, Nigrita canicapillus
- Cut-throat finch, Amadina fasciata
- Black-faced quailfinch, Ortygospiza atricollis
- Black-chinned quailfinch, Ortygospiza gabonensis
- Zebra waxbill, Amandava subflava
- Bronze mannikin, Spermestes cucullata
- Black-and-white mannikin, Spermestes bicolor
- Magpie mannikin, Spermestes fringilloides

== Passeriformes: Viduidae ==
- Pin-tailed whydah, Vidua macroura
- Village indigobird, Vidua chalybeata

== Passeriformes: Passeridae ==
- House sparrow, Passer domesticus
- Northern grey-headed sparrow, Passer griseus

== Passeriformes: Motacillidae ==
- Tree pipit, Anthus trivialis
- Red-throated pipit, Anthus cervinus
- Plain-backed pipit, Anthus leucophrys
- African pipit, Anthus cinnamomeus
- Yellow-throated longclaw, Macronyx croceus
- Cape wagtail, Motacilla capensis
- Yellow wagtail, Motacilla flava
- African wagtail, Motacilla aguimp

== Passeriformes: Fringillidae ==
- Western citril, Crithagra frontalis
- Papyrus canary, Crithagra koliensis
- Black-throated canary, Crithagra atrogularis
- Yellow-fronted canary, Crithagra mozambica
- White-bellied canary, Crithagra dorsostriata
- Brimstone canary, Crithagra sulphurata

== Passeriformes: Emberizidae ==
- Golden-breasted bunting, Fringillaria flaviventris

== Passeriformes: Hyliotidae ==
- Yellow-bellied hyliota, Hyliota flavigaster

== Passeriformes: Stenostiridae ==
- Dusky crested-flycatcher, Elminia nigromitrata
- Blue crested-flycatcher, Elminia longicauda

== Passeriformes: Paridae ==
- Northern black tit, Melaniparus leucomelas
- White-shouldered black tit, Melaniparus guineensis
- Dusky tit, Melaniparus funereus

== Passeriformes: Remizidae ==
- Grey penduline tit, Anthoscopus caroli

== Passeriformes: Nicatoridae ==
- Western nicator, Nicator chloris

== Passeriformes: Alaudidae ==
- Rufous-naped lark, Mirafra africana
- Flappet lark, Mirafra rufocinnamomea

== Passeriformes: Macrosphenidae ==
- Northern crombec, Sylvietta brachyura
- Red-faced crombec, Sylvietta whytii
- Green crombec, Sylvietta virens
- Moustached grass warbler, Melocichla mentalis
- Yellow longbill, Macrosphenus flavicans
- Grey longbill, Macrosphenus concolor

== Passeriformes: Cisticolidae ==
- White-chinned prinia, Schistolais leucopogon
- Yellow-breasted apalis, Apalis flavida
- Black-throated apalis, Apalis jacksoni
- Black-capped apalis, Apalis nigriceps
- Buff-throated apalis, Apalis rufogularis
- Buff-bellied warbler, Phyllolais pulchella
- Grey-backed camaroptera, Camaroptera brachyura
- Olive-green camaroptera, Camaroptera chloronota
- Grey-capped warbler, Eminia lepida
- Red-faced cisticola, Cisticola erythrops
- Singing cisticola, Cisticola cantans
- Whistling cisticola, Cisticola lateralis
- Winding cisticola, Cisticola galactotes
- Carruthers's cisticola, Cisticola carruthersi
- Croaking cisticola, Cisticola natalensis
- Short-winged cisticola, Cisticola brachypterus
- Zitting cisticola, Cisticola juncidis
- Black-faced rufous warbler, Bathmocercus rufus
- Tawny-flanked prinia, Prinia subflava

== Passeriformes: Locustellidae ==
- River warbler, Locustella fluviatilis
- Fan-tailed grassbird, Schoenicola brevirostris
- White-winged swamp warbler, Bradypterus carpalis

== Passeriformes: Acrocephalidae ==
- Olivaceous warbler, Iduna pallida
- Dark-capped yellow warbler, Iduna natalensis
- Upcher's warbler, Hippolais languida
- Icterine warbler, Hippolais icterina
- Sedge warbler, Acrocephalus schoenobaenus
- Common reed warbler, Acrocephalus scirpaceus
- Lesser swamp warbler, Acrocephalus gracilirostris
- Greater swamp warbler, Acrocephalus rufescens
- Great reed warbler, Acrocephalus arundinaceus

== Passeriformes: Hirundinidae ==
- Grey-rumped swallow, Pseudhirundo griseopyga
- White-headed saw-wing, Psalidoprocne albiceps
- Black saw-wing, Psalidoprocne pristoptera
- Northern house martin, Delichon urbicum
- Lesser striped swallow, Cecropis abyssinica
- Rufous-chested swallow, Cecropis semirufa
- Mosque swallow, Cecropis senegalensis
- Red-rumped swallow, Cecropis daurica
- Blue swallow, Hirundo atrocaerulea
- Wire-tailed swallow, Hirundo smithii
- Barn swallow, Hirundo rustica
- Angola swallow, Hirundo angolensis
- Ethiopian swallow, Hirundo aethiopica
- Rock martin, Ptyonoprogne fuligula
- Banded martin, Neophedina cincta
- Plain martin, Riparia paludicola
- Sand martin, Riparia riparia

== Passeriformes: Pycnonotidae ==
- Slender-billed greenbul, Stelgidillas gracilirostris
- Red-tailed bristlebill, Bleda syndactylus
- Lesser bristlebill, Bleda notatus
- Yellow-throated greenbul, Atimastillas flavicollis
- Spotted greenbul, Ixonotus guttatus
- Honeyguide greenbul, Baeopogon indicator
- Yellow-whiskered greenbul, Eurillas latirostris
- Little greenbul, Eurillas virens
- Grey greenbul, Eurillas gracilis
- Plain greenbul, Eurillas curvirostris
- Red-tailed greenbul, Criniger calurus
- White-throated greenbul, Phyllastrephus albigularis
- Toro greenbul, Phyllastrephus hypochloris
- Leaf-love, Phyllastrephus scandens
- Common bulbul, Pycnonotus barbatus

== Passeriformes: Phylloscopidae ==
- Wood warbler, Rhadina sibilatrix
- Willow warbler, Phylloscopus trochilus
- Uganda woodland warbler, Seicercus budongoensis

== Passeriformes: Scotocercidae ==
- Green hylia, Hylia prasina
- Tit hylia, Pholidornis rushiae

== Passeriformes: Sylviidae ==
- Eurasian blackcap, Sylvia atricapilla
- Garden warbler, Sylvia borin
- Barred warbler, Curruca nisoria
- Common whitethroat, Curruca communis

== Passeriformes: Zosteropidae ==
- Green white-eye, Zosterops stuhlmanni
- Northern yellow white-eye, Zosterops senegalensis

== Passeriformes: Pellorneidae ==
- Brown thrush babbler, Illadopsis fulvescens

== Passeriformes: Leiothrichidae ==
- Black-lored babbler, Turdoides sharpei
- Brown babbler, Turdoides plebejus

== Passeriformes: Buphagidae ==
- Red-billed oxpecker, Buphagus erythrorhynchus

== Passeriformes: Sturnidae ==
- Wattled starling, Creatophora cinerea
- Red-winged starling, Onychognathus morio
- Chestnut-winged starling, Onychognathus fulgidus
- Stuhlmann's starling, Poeoptera stuhlmanni
- Rüppell's glossy starling, Lamprotornis purpuroptera
- Splendid glossy starling, Lamprotornis splendidus
- Lesser blue-eared starling, Lamprotornis chloropterus
- Purple starling, Lamprotornis purpureus
- Bronze-tailed starling, Lamprotornis chalcurus
- Greater blue-eared starling, Lamprotornis chalybaeus
- Amethyst starling, Cinnyricinclus leucogaster
- Purple-headed starling, Hylopsar purpureiceps

== Passeriformes: Muscicapidae ==
- Fire-crested alethe, Alethe castanea
- Brown-backed scrub robin, Cercotrichas hartlaubi
- White-browed scrub robin, Cercotrichas leucophrys
- Spotted flycatcher, Muscicapa striata
- Ashy flycatcher, Muscicapa caerulescens
- Swamp flycatcher, Muscicapa aquatica
- African dusky flycatcher, Muscicapa adusta
- Dusky-blue flycatcher, Muscicapa comitata
- Sooty flycatcher, Muscicapa infuscata
- Grey-throated tit flycatcher, Myioparus griseigularis
- Grey tit flycatcher, Myioparus plumbeus
- Pale flycatcher, Bradornis pallidus
- Northern black flycatcher, Melaenornis edolioides
- White-browed robin chat, Cossypha heuglini
- Snowy-crowned robin chat, Cossypha niveicapilla
- Blue-shouldered robin chat, Cossypha cyanocampter
- Brown-chested alethe, Chamaetylas poliocephala
- Lowland akalat, Sheppardia cyornithopsis
- Grey-winged akalat, Sheppardia polioptera
- Forest robin, Stiphrornis erythrothorax
- Common nightingale, Luscinia megarhynchos
- Semi-collared flycatcher, Ficedula semitorquata
- Common redstart, Phoenicurus phoenicurus
- Whinchat, Saxicola rubetra
- African stonechat, Saxicola torquatus
- Sooty chat, Myrmecocichla nigra
- Northern wheatear, Oenanthe oenanthe
- Isabelline wheatear, Oenanthe isabellina
- Mocking cliff chat, Thamnolaea cinnamomeiventris

== Passeriformes: Turdidae ==
- Rufous flycatcher thrush, Stizorhina fraseri
- Ethiopian thrush, Turdus abyssinicus
- African thrush, Turdus pelios

== See also ==
- List of birds of Africa
- List of birds of Uganda
