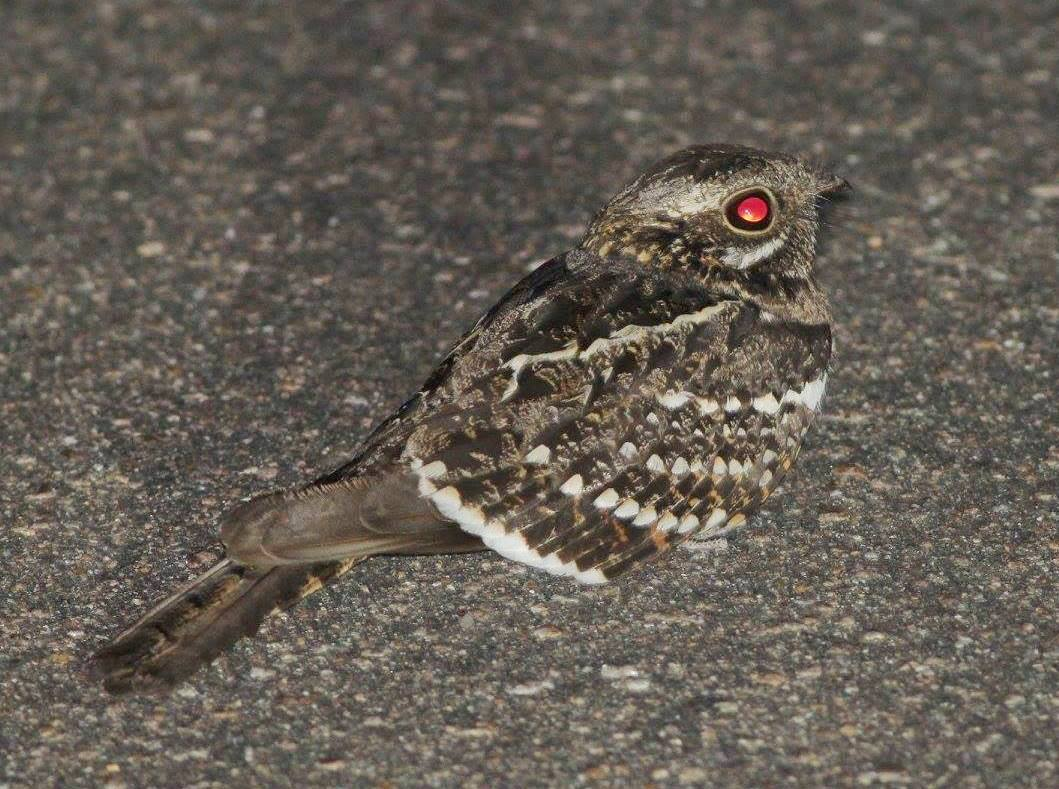

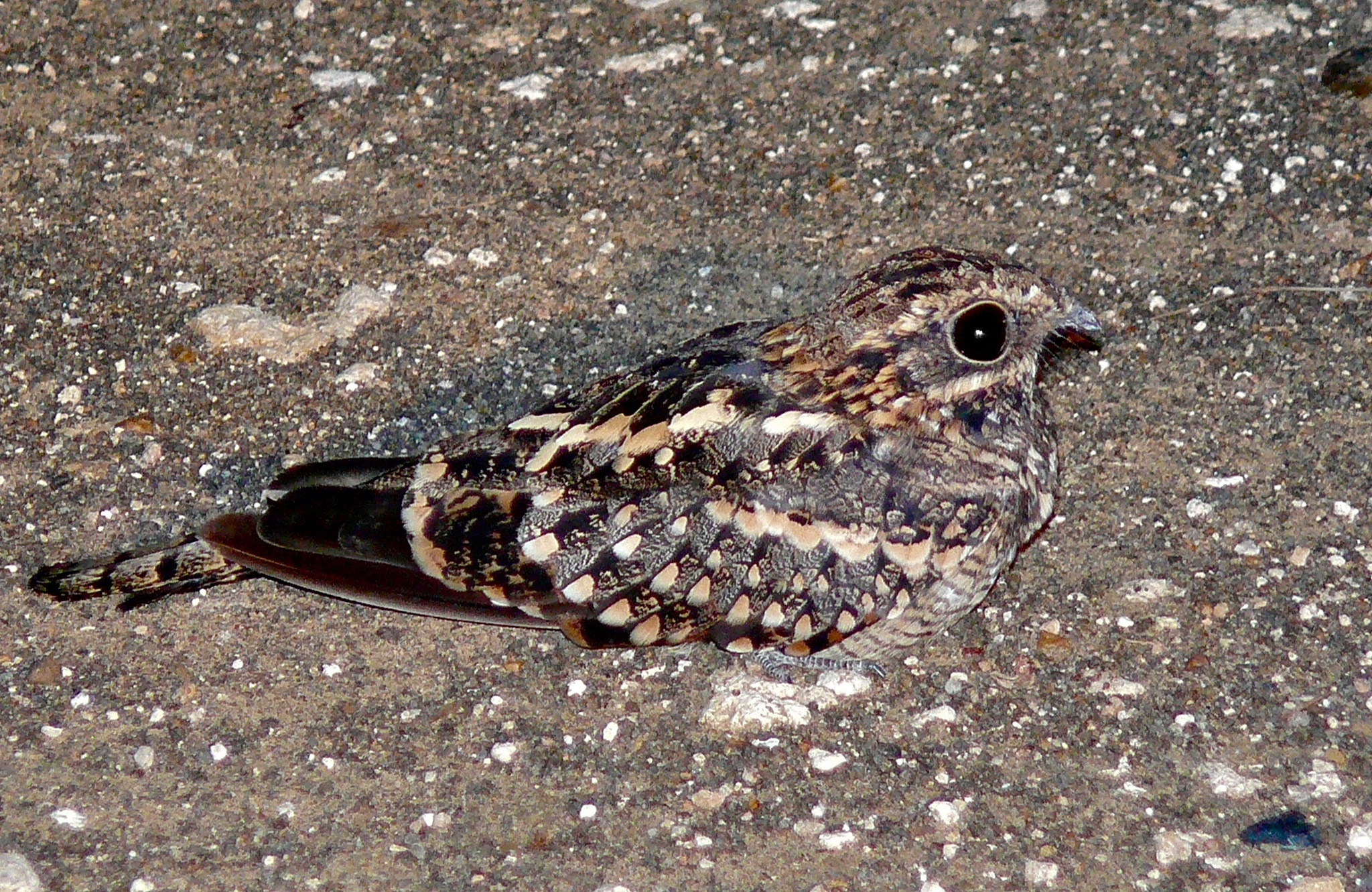
- Male and female

Conservation status
- Least Concern (IUCN 3.1)

Scientific classification
- Kingdom: Animalia
- Phylum: Chordata
- Class: Aves
- Order: Caprimulgiformes
- Family: Caprimulgidae
- Genus: Caprimulgus
- Species: C. fossii

Binomial name
- Caprimulgus fossii Hartlaub, 1857

= Square-tailed nightjar =

Species of bird

The square-tailed nightjar (Caprimulgus fossii) is a species of nightjar in the family Caprimulgidae which is native to tropical and subtropical woodlands of the Afrotropics. It has an extensive range south of the African equator. Despite not having a completely "square tail", its naming highlights a distinguishing field mark. The similarly plumaged slender-tailed nightjar, found in dry bush country of the tropics, differs namely by its protruding central tail feathers. It is alternatively known as the Gabon nightjar or Gaboon nightjar or the Mozambique nightjar.

== Range ==
It occurs mainly south of the equator in Africa, but enters the tropics during the northern hemisphere summer. An isolated race occurs in Equatorial Guinea and western Gabon. It is a seasonal visitor to the northern DRC, northern Tanzania, southern Kenya and southern Uganda. It occurs year-round in Angola, Botswana, Burundi, Republic of the Congo, Eswatini, Lesotho, Malawi, Mozambique, Namibia, Rwanda, South Africa, Tanzania, Zambia and Zimbabwe.

== Call ==
This bird's call is a prolonged churring, which alternates between a fast and slow pace roughly every second. As such it differs from the similar long-tailed and slender-tailed nightjars which produce fast and slow churrs respectively.

== Subspecies ==
- C. f. fossii Hartlaub, 1857 – western Gabon and vicinity
- C. f. welwitschii Bocage, 1867 – mainly inland plateaus, DRC to northern Namibia
- C. f. mossambicus W.K.H. Peters, 1868 – lowlands and lowveld from the DRC to South Africa
- C. f. griseoplurus Clancey, 1965 – Kalahari desert and vicinity, seasonal in Botswana
