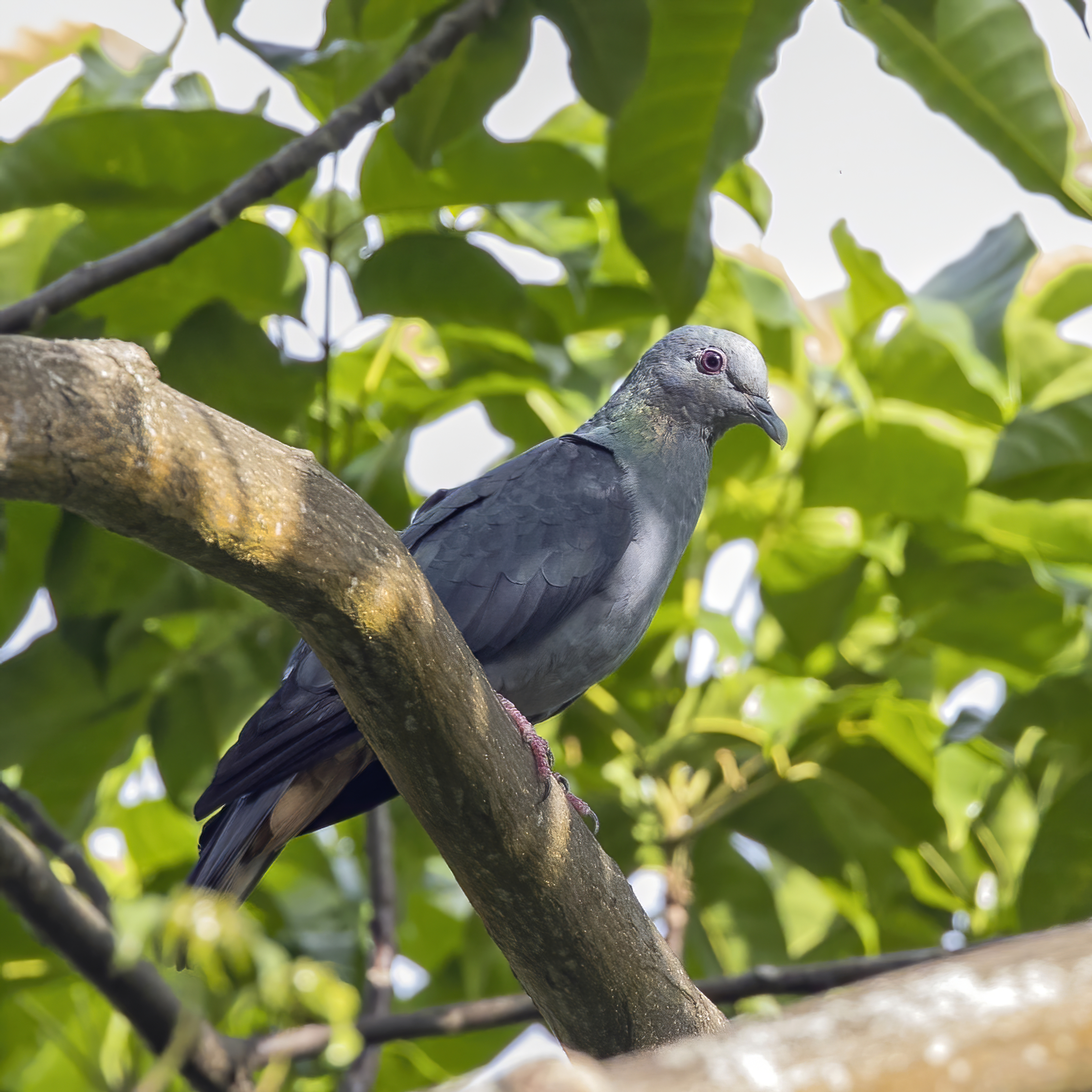
- São Tomé island

Conservation status
- Near Threatened (IUCN 3.1)

Scientific classification
- Kingdom: Animalia
- Phylum: Chordata
- Class: Aves
- Order: Columbiformes
- Family: Columbidae
- Genus: Columba
- Species: C. malherbii

Binomial name
- Columba malherbii Verreaux, J & Verreaux, É, 1851

= Island bronze-naped pigeon =

Species of bird

The island bronze-naped pigeon (Columba malherbii), also known as the São Tomé bronze-naped pigeon or São Tomé pigeon, is a species of bird in the pigeon family, Columbidae. It is endemic to the Gulf of Guinea, where it is found on the islands of São Tomé, Príncipe, and Annobón. It inhabits rainforest, secondary forests, and plantations at elevations of up to 1,668 m (5,472 ft), although it is more common at lower elevations. A small, darkish pigeon, it has a total length of 28 cm (11 in). Adult males have slate-grey heads and upper backs, blackish-grey wings, backs, and tails, buffy-white throats, ashy-grey breasts and bellies, and rufous vents. The back of the neck and upper back are glossy pink or green, while the wings have a green tinge to them. Females are similar, but have browner undersides, duller and less glossy upperparts, and more rusty-orange outer tail feathers.

The species is frugivorous and feeds on a variety of fruits and berries. Breeding takes place from November to January on Príncipe and February onwards on São Tomé. It builds sturdy platform nests 5–12 m (16–39 ft) up in trees and lays one or two dirty-white eggs. Island bronze-naped pigeons are usually seen singly or in small flocks of up to seven birds. It is listed as being near threatened by the International Union for Conservation of Nature (IUCN) on the IUCN Red List due to an ongoing "moderately quick" decline in its population caused by hunting.

== Taxonomy ==
The island bronze-naped pigeon was described as Columba Malherbii in 1851 by Jules and Édouard Verreaux based on specimen from São Tomé, although they erroneously mentioned the type locality as being "Gaboon". The generic name is derived from the Latin word columba, meaning 'pigeon' or 'dove'. The specific name malherbii is in honour of Alfred Malherbe, a French jurist and ornithologist. Island bronze-naped pigeon is the official common name designated by the International Ornithologists' Union. Other common names for the species include São Tomé bronze-naped pigeon, São Tomé grey pigeon, São Tomé pigeon, and Malherbe's pigeon. It has no subspecies.

The island bronze-naped pigeon is one of 35 species in the genus Columba in the pigeon family Columbidae. It is occasionally considered to be the same species as the western and eastern bronze-naped pigeons; these three species are also sometimes placed in the subgenus Turturoena.

== Description ==
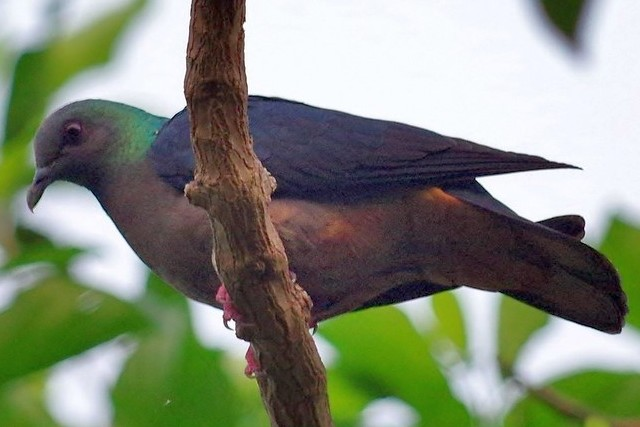
Showing iridescent green on back of neck and upper back

The island bronze-naped pigeon is a small, darkish pigeon with a total length of 28 cm (11 in) and a wing length of 178–182 mm (7.0–7.2 in) in males and 165–176 mm (6.5–6.9 in) in females. In adult males, the crown (top of the head), forecrown, hindcrown, back of the neck, and mantle are slaty-grey, with the last three having a glossy pink or green sheen. The wings and back down to the top of the tail are blackish-grey with a greenish tinge. The chin and throat are buffy-white, while the breast and belly are pale ashy-grey. The vent and underside of the tail are rufous with grey spots, while the upper side of the tail is blackish-grey with a yellowish-brown wash on the edges of the rectrices. The eye-ring is narrow and light grey and the iris is pale grey. The bill is dark grey with a pale tip, and the feet are red.

Females are similar to males, but have browner undersides, with fine yellow-brown speckling on the lower breast and upper belly. The lower belly down to the vent is pale rufous with grey speckling. The upperparts are duller and less glossy, and the outer tail feathers are more rusty-orange. Juveniles are like females but browner overall, with less iridescence on the back of the neck, ochre or rufous freckles on the upperparts, and buff edges to the feathers of the crown and forecrown.

The species is similar in appearance to the closely related western and eastern bronze-naped pigeons, but does not co-occur with them in any part of its range. On São Tomé, it may be confused with the São Tomé olive pigeon and São Tomé lemon dove. The olive pigeon is larger, with white spots on the lower breast and wings. Males are also maroon; females are more similar in colour, but are generally darker grey than the island bronze-naped pigeon. The lemon dove is more terrestrial in its habits and has a plumper appearance. It also has duller and less extensive green iridescence, as well as red orbital skin and irises.

=== Vocalisations ===
The advertising call consists of two hoarse hoots followed by 15–20 stuttering notes, "rhuuuw...rhuuw...rhu-tu-tu-tu-tutututu", with the later notes being shorter and eventually fading away. It is quite distinct from the calls of the other bronze-naped pigeons, and is more reminiscent of Streptopelia doves in its tone and structure. The species also makes nasal "wuh..wuh..." calls when feeding.

== Distribution and habitat ==
The island bronze-naped pigeon is endemic to the Gulf of Guinea, where it occurs on the islands of São Tomé and Príncipe in São Tomé and Príncipe, and Annobón in Equatorial Guinea. On Annobón, it inhabits rainforest at elevations of up to 500 m (1,600 ft) above sea level. On Príncipe, it inhabits forests and plantations, and is considerably less common in primary forest than other similar species. On São Tomé, it also inhabits forests and plantations, but is more common in human-modified habitats like shade forests and non-forested areas like savannas. It occurs at elevations of up to 1,668 m (5,472 ft), but is more common at lower elevations and is absent from high-elevation forests on São Tomé.

== Behaviour and ecology ==
The island bronze-naped pigeon is an arboreal (tree-inhabiting) species usually seen singly or in small flocks of up to seven birds. It is usually seen in forest canopies, and has a fast, direct flight. It feeds on a variety of fruits and berries, usually foraging at heights of 3–16 m (9.8–52.5 ft) in forests or plantations. It will also sometimes come to the ground to eat fruit. On São Tomé, it is known to eat Cestrum laevigatum growing on hedges bordering farmland.

Breeding takes place from November to January on Príncipe and February onwards on São Tomé. It is more conspicuous during the breeding season and is more easily seen in forests, savannas, and near the coast. Nests are sturdy platforms built 5–12 m (16–39 ft) up in trees, usually near the trunk, in secondary forests, Erythrina, or cocoa tree plantations. Eggs are dirty-white and laid in clutches of one or two. Nothing is known about its incubation and fledging.

== Conservation ==
The island bronze-naped pigeon is common in parts of its range, but is considered near-threatened by the International Union for Conservation of Nature due to an ongoing "moderately quick" decline in its population caused by hunting. On São Tomé, it widespread at low and mid-elevations; the population on the island is estimated to number 47,846–205,079 total individuals, of which 32,000–137,400 are adults. The species was uncommon on Príncipe in the 1940s, but is now reported to be very common in the lowlands. On Annobón, it has gone from being common to relatively uncommon, although some surveys have found it to still be fairly common, albeit with a more restricted distribution on the island.

The main threat to the species is hunting for its meat; the species is a favoured prey and is popular at bars and parties. Birds, especially pigeons, are in high demand in restaurants on São Tomé, and a majority of hunters on the island hunt to sell the meat, although some also hunt for food or for enjoyment. Island bronze-naped pigeons are the preferred prey for commercial hunters on São Tomé, with the species accounting for nearly 60% of the birds captured by commercial hunters. In all, an estimated 8,601–29,743 island bronze-naped pigeons are harvested on São Tomé annually; although this is currently within sustainable levels of extraction for the species, hunting pressure on the pigeon may be increasing and a substantial number of young children are involved in hunting. Some birds are also captured alive for captive breeding.

The island bronze-naped pigeon is able to make use of secondary vegetation and somewhat degraded habitats, making it somewhat tolerant of habitat loss; however, this same tendency may make it easier to capture for hunters, who do not have to venture into dense vegetation to hunt the species. The species is generally becoming scarcer near populated areas because of hunting pressure. The species occurs within the Obô Natural Park of São Tomé, which covers one third of São Tomé, including most of its primary forest and large tracts of secondary forest. Hunting is illegal in protected areas and from October to February, but enforcement of hunting bans is poor.
