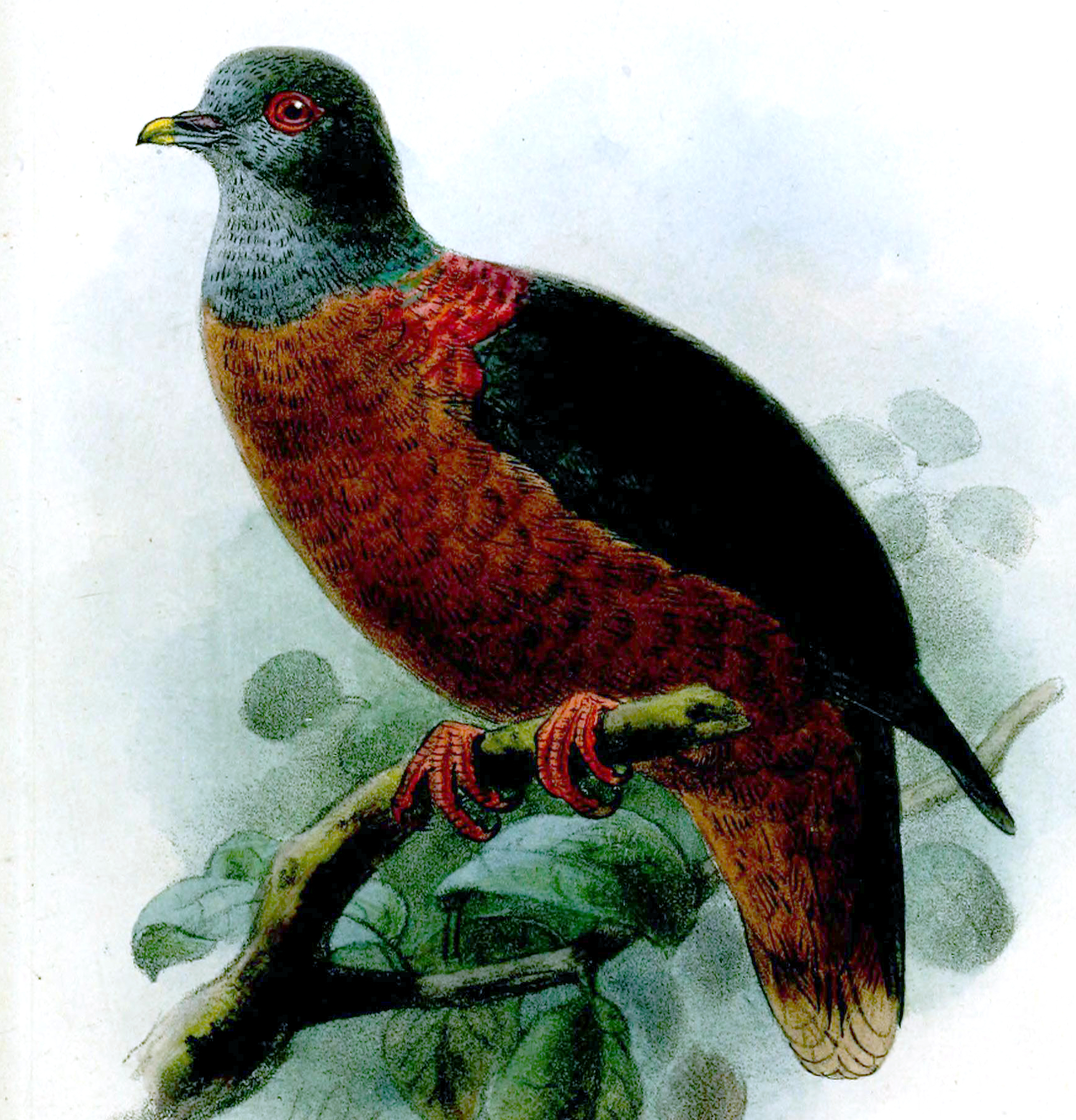

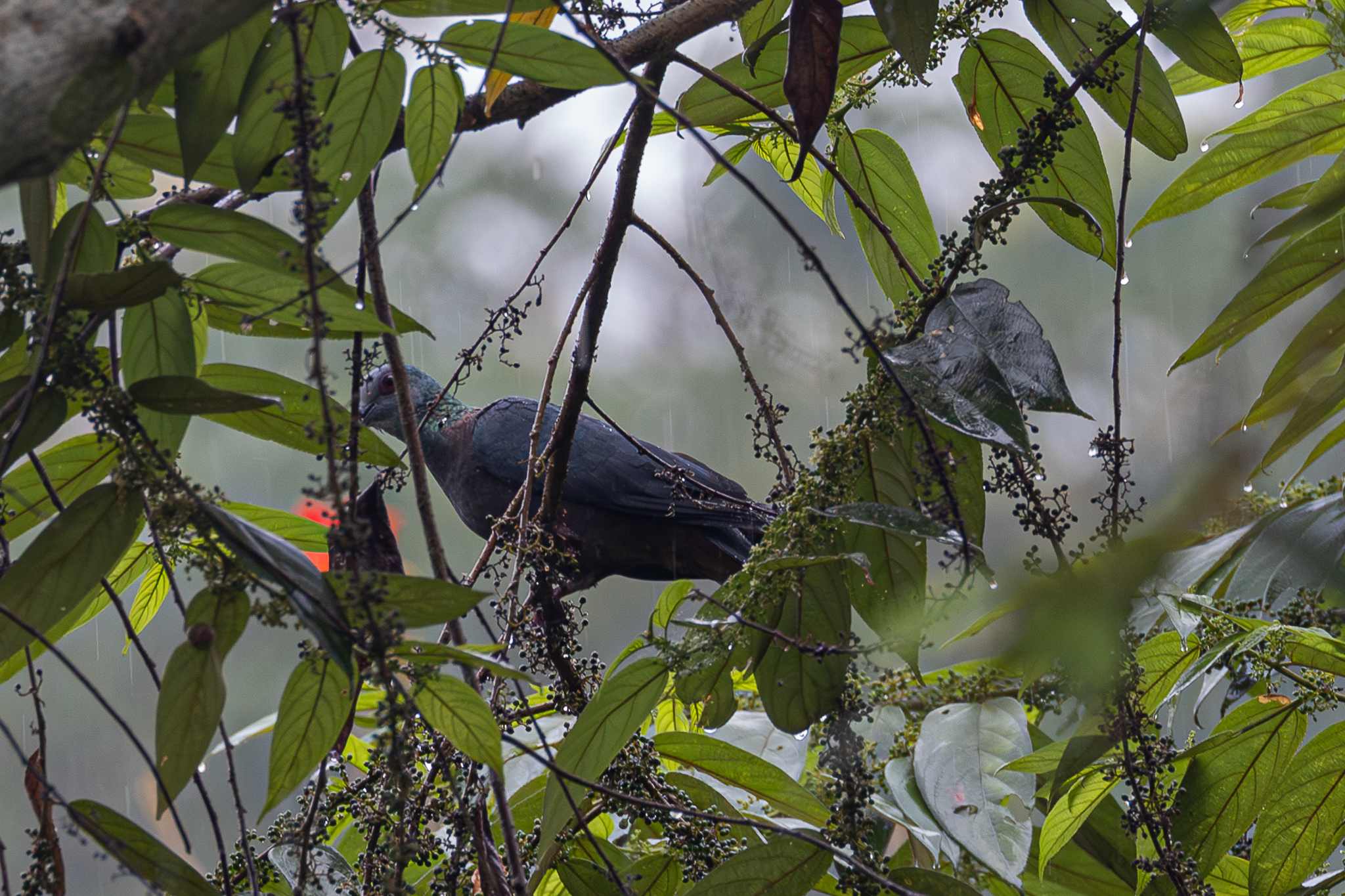

Conservation status
- Least Concern (IUCN 3.1)

Scientific classification
- Kingdom: Animalia
- Phylum: Chordata
- Class: Aves
- Order: Columbiformes
- Family: Columbidae
- Genus: Columba
- Species: C. iriditorques

Binomial name
- Columba iriditorques Cassin, 1857

= Western bronze-naped pigeon =

Species of bird

The western bronze-naped pigeon (Columba iriditorques) is a species of bird in the family Columbidae, part of the subgenus Turturoena. A medium sized bird, it has a pale, broad terminal tail band which is noticeable on landing. It is found in most countries of Africa. The IUCN Red List classifies it as a species of least concern.

== Taxonomy ==
The western bronze-naped pigeon was formally described in 1857 by the American ornithologist John Cassin as Columra [sic] iriditorques based on a specimen collected near the Saint Paul River in Liberia. The specific epithet combines the Latin iris, iridis meaning "rainbow" with torquis or torques meaning "collar". It is occasionally considered conspecific (belonging to the same species) with the eastern bronze-naped pigeon (Columba delegorguei) and the island bronze-naped pigeon (Columba malherbii), and the three species are sometimes placed in the subgenus Turturoena.

== Description ==
A medium sized bird, the western bronze-naped pigeon measures about 25 centimetres (9.8 in) in length. It has a pale, broad terminal tail band which is noticeable on landing. The adult male weighs about 130 grams (4.6 oz), and has dark bluish grey head, and dark vinous belly and breast. The adult female weighs about 122 grams (4.3 oz), and has cinnamon-reddish brown crown, and greyish chestnut underparts.

== Distribution and habitat ==
It is widespread across the African tropical rainforest.

== Status and conservation ==
Since 1988, the western bronze-naped pigeon has been rated as a species of least concern on the IUCN Red List. This is because it has a large range, and because its population is stable and thought not to have declined by 30% over ten years or three generations. Although the population size has not been measured, it is thought to be more than the threshold required to warrant it a vulnerable rating. There is no evidence of any population decline of the species, or substantial threat to it.
