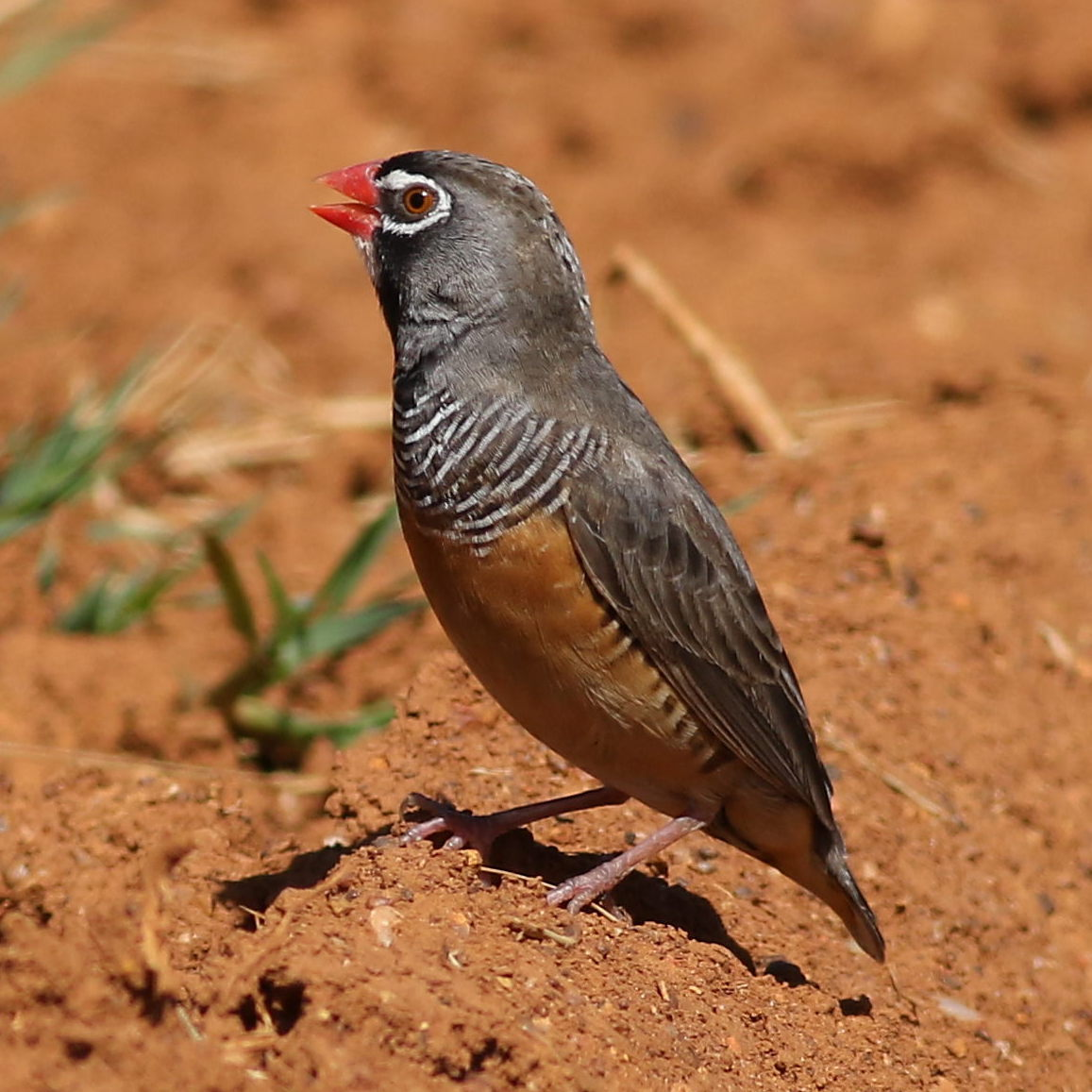
- O. a. fuscocrissa, male, at Suikerbosrand, South Africa

Scientific classification
- Kingdom: Animalia
- Phylum: Chordata
- Class: Aves
- Order: Passeriformes
- Family: Estrildidae
- Genus: Ortygospiza
- Species: O. atricollis
- Subspecies: O. a. fuscocrissa

Trinomial name
- Ortygospiza atricollis fuscocrissa (Heuglin, 1863)

= African quailfinch =

Species of bird

The African quailfinch, spectacled quailfinch, or white-chinned quailfinch (Ortygospiza atricollis fuscocrissa), is a common species of estrildid finch found in eastern and southern Africa. Some taxonomists consider it to be conspecific with the black-faced quailfinch and the black-chinned quailfinch, others consider all three species to be conspecific.

== Description ==
The African quailfinch is 10 centimeters (4 inches) in length and weighs 9-14 grams (0.3-0.5 ounces). It is small and compact with dark grey underparts, barred breasts and flanks, and an orange-buff central belly. The feathers around its eye and on its chin are white. Breeding males have a red bill, while the bills of females and non-breeding males have a brown upper mandible and a red lower mandible. The female is paler than the male and has less distinctive barring.

=== Voice ===
It calls a tinny "chink-chink" when in flight.

== Distribution and ecology ==
The African quailfinch is found in East and southern Africa. It inhabits grassland and weedy areas, especially near water. It eats seeds, filamentous algae, insects, and spiders.

== Geographical variation ==
When considered a full species, the following geographical variation has been accepted:

- O. f. fuscocrissa – Eritrea and Ethiopia
- O. f. muelleri – Kenya, Tanzania, Malawi, Zambia, Angola, Namibia, Botswana and Zimbabwe
- O. f. smithersi – Zambia
- O. f. pallida – Botswana and Zimbabwe
- O. f. digressa – Zimbabwe, Mozambique, and South Africa

== Gallery ==
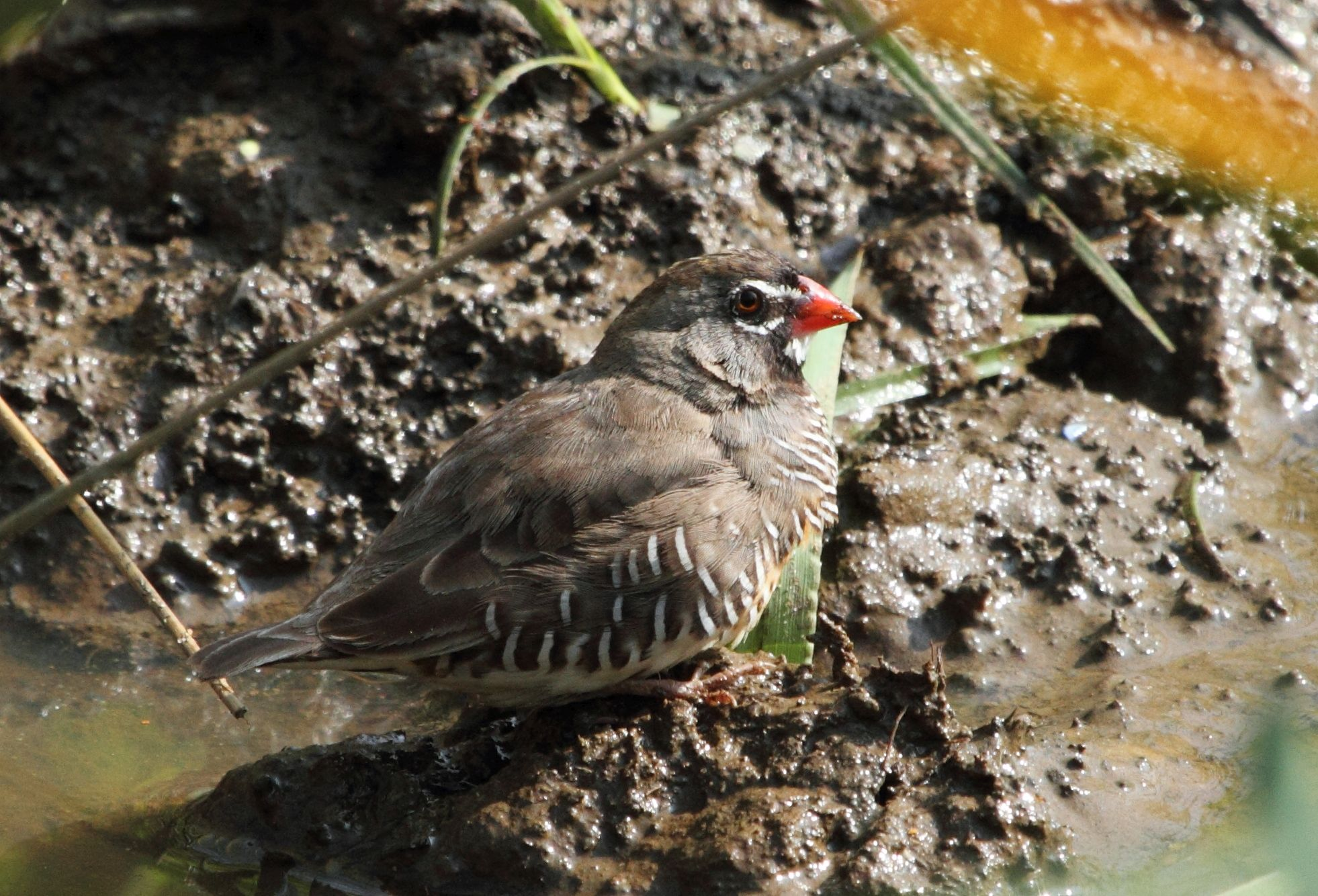

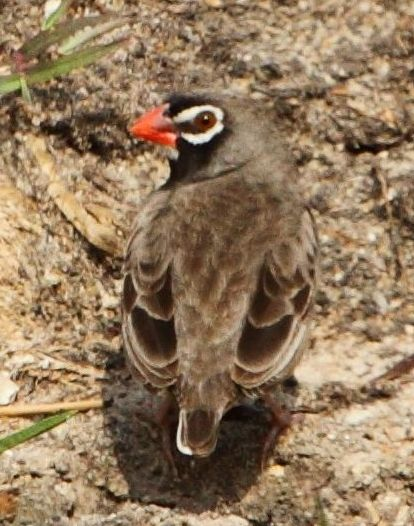
male

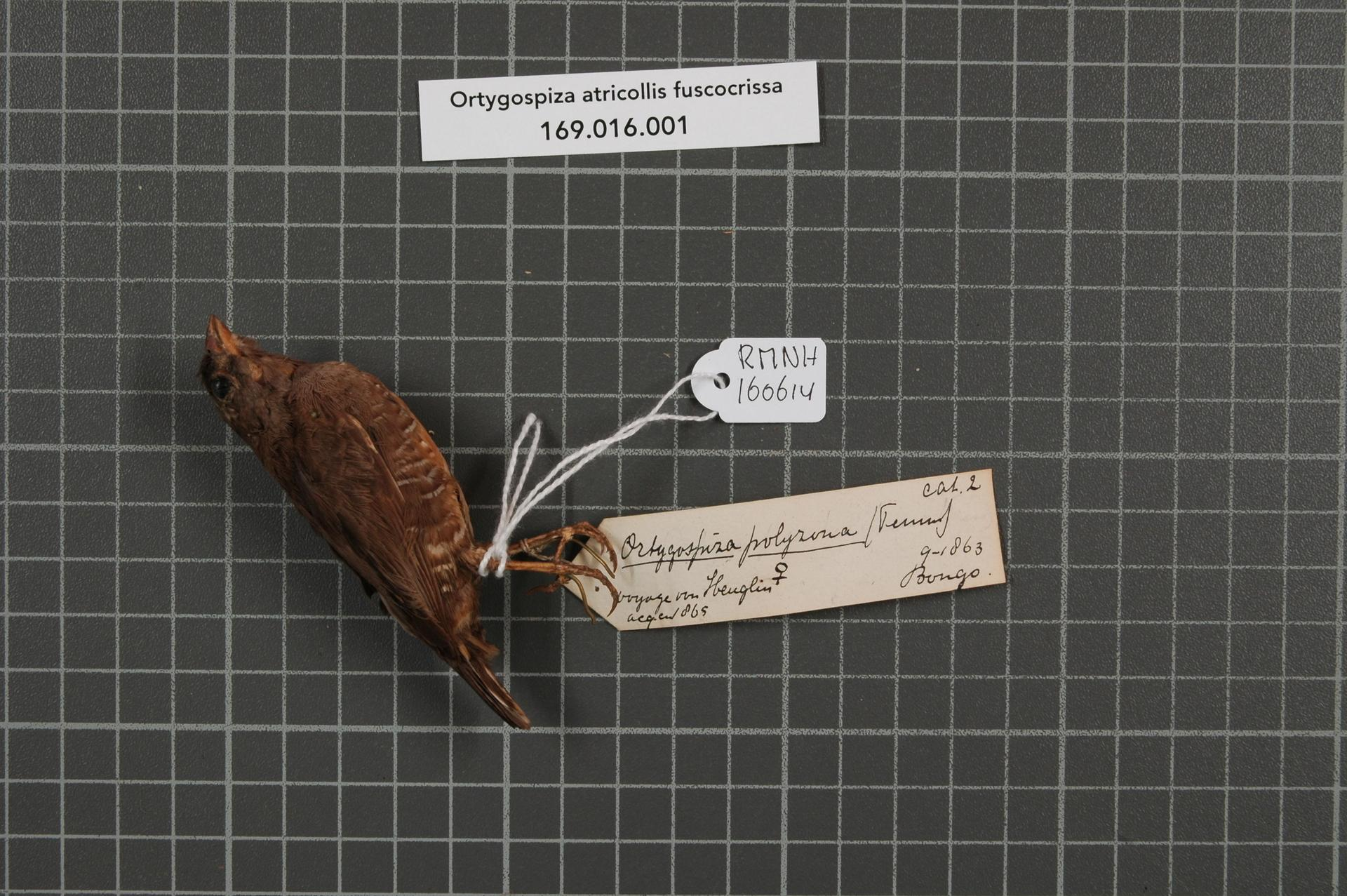
female skin

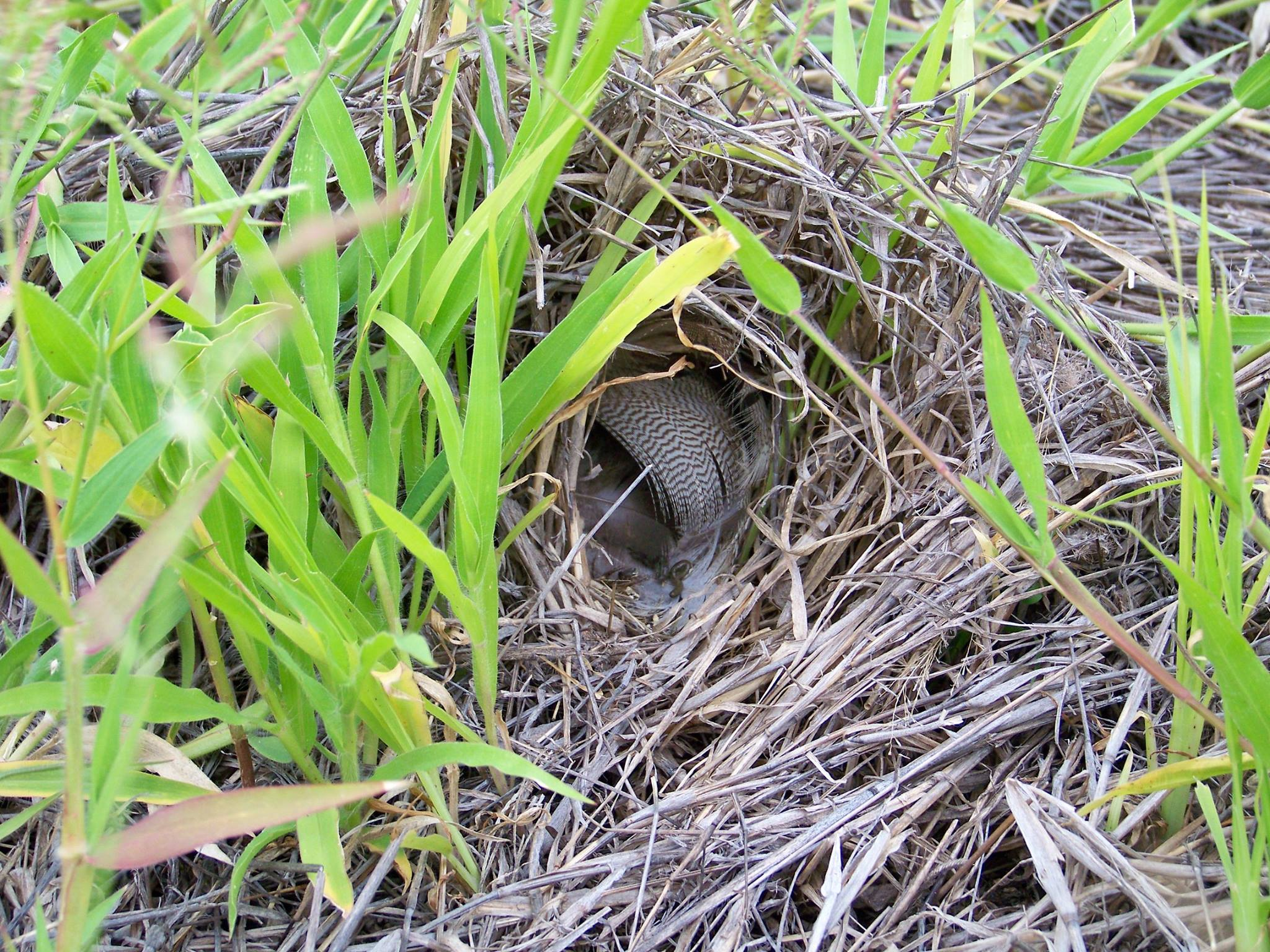
nest
