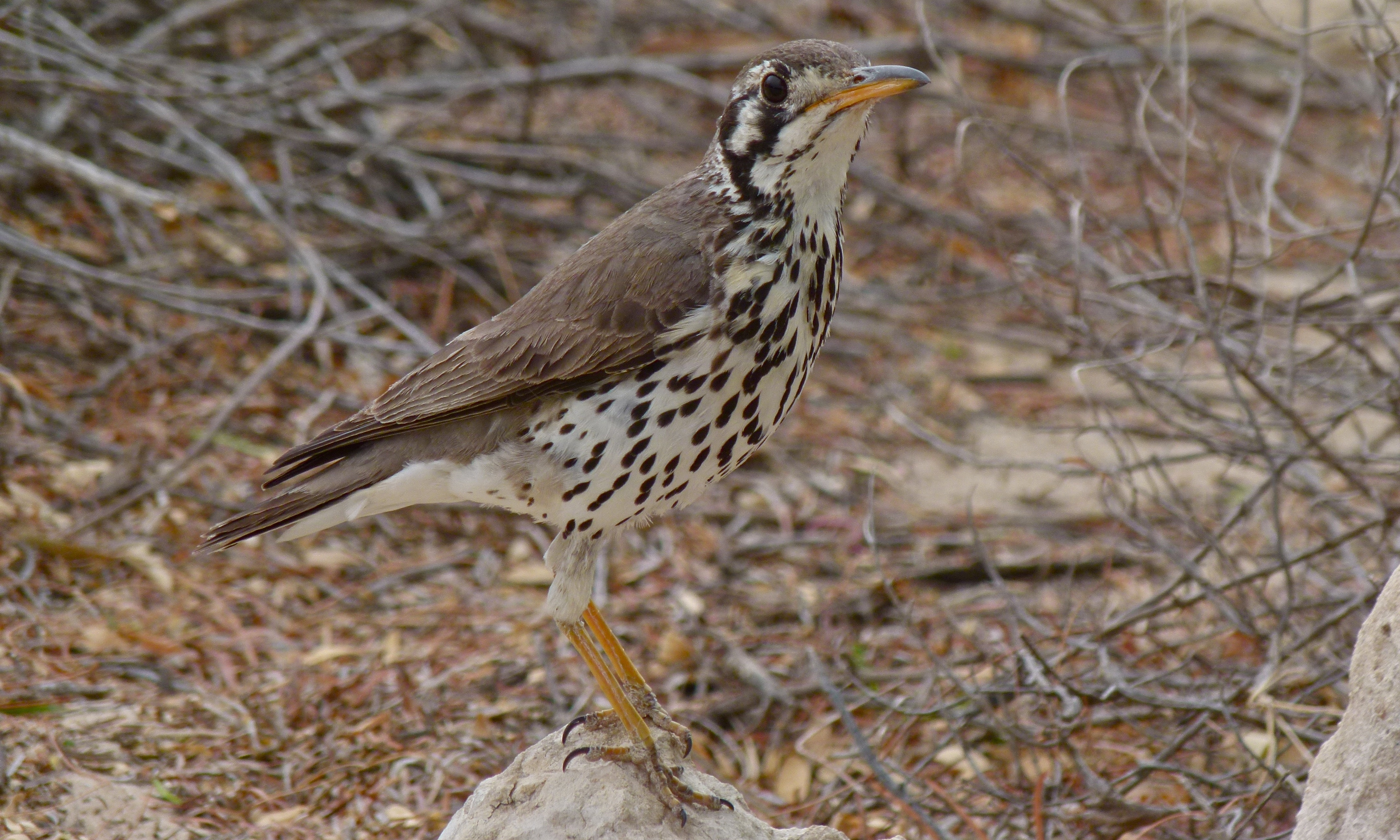
- Photographed at Kgalagadi Transfrontier Park, and calling at Dinokeng Game Reserve

Conservation status
- Least Concern (IUCN 3.1)

Scientific classification
- Kingdom: Animalia
- Phylum: Chordata
- Class: Aves
- Order: Passeriformes
- Family: Turdidae
- Genus: Turdus
- Species: T. litsitsirupa

Binomial name
- Turdus litsitsirupa (Smith, 1836)

Synonyms
- Psophocichla litsitsirupa Cabanis, 1860; Psophocichla litsipsirupa

= Groundscraper thrush =

Species of bird (Turdus litsitsirupa)

The groundscraper thrush (Turdus litsitsirupa) is a passerine bird of southern and eastern Africa belonging to the thrush family, Turdidae. It was previously considered the only member of the genus Psophocichla, but phylogenetic analysis supports it belonging in the genus Turdus, where it forms a sister group to the remaining Turdus species.

It is 22–24 centimetres (8.7–9.4 in) long with an erect posture, short tail, heavy bill and fairly long legs. The upperparts are plain grey-brown with a chestnut wing-panel. The underparts are white with black spots and the face is white with bold black markings. The underwing has a black and white pattern which is visible during the undulating flight. The bird has a slow whistled song and a clicking call.

There are three subspecies; T. l. litsitsirupa is the most southerly form, occurring from Namibia, Botswana, Zimbabwe and Mozambique south to northern and eastern parts of South Africa. T. l. pauciguttata is found in southern Angola, northern Namibia and north-west Botswana, while T. l. stierlingae occurs in a band from northern Angola across to western Tanzania, Malawi and north-west Mozambique. It can be tame and will forage in parks, gardens and around picnic sites.

The Ethiopian thrush (Turdus simensis) was formerly treated as a fourth subspecies, but is genetically as well as geographically distinct.

The cup-shaped nest is built using vegetation and spider-webs and is lined with feathers or leaves. Three or four eggs are laid and are incubated for 14 to 15 days. They are bluish with lilac and red-brown spots and blotches.
