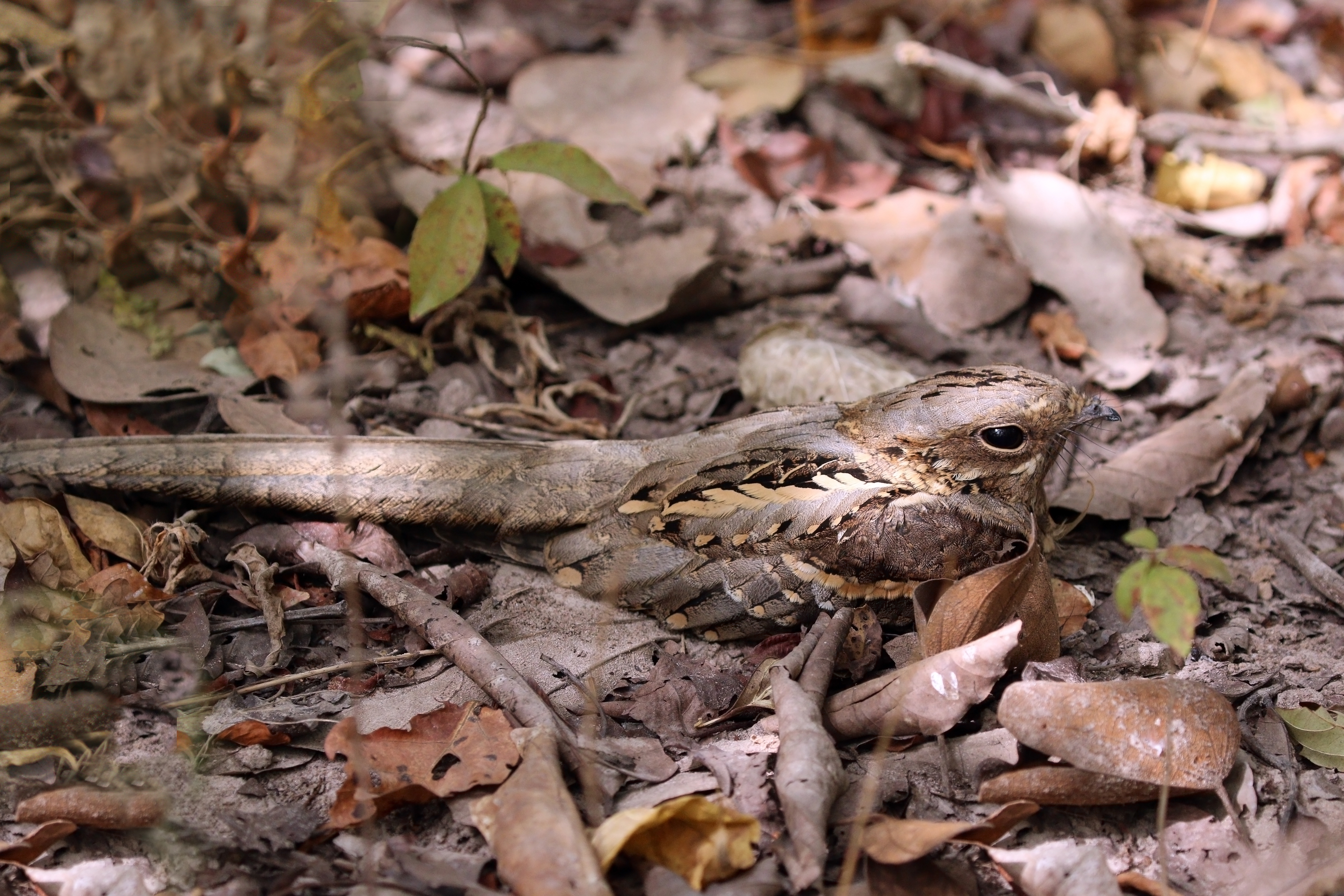
- Male C. c. climacurus Gambia

Conservation status
- Least Concern (IUCN 3.1)

Scientific classification
- Kingdom: Animalia
- Phylum: Chordata
- Class: Aves
- Clade: Strisores
- Order: Caprimulgiformes
- Family: Caprimulgidae
- Genus: Caprimulgus
- Species: C. climacurus

Binomial name
- Caprimulgus climacurus Vieillot, 1824

= Long-tailed nightjar =

Species of bird

The long-tailed nightjar (Caprimulgus climacurus) is one of 98 species of nightjar in the family Caprimulgidae, the "true nightjars". It is a nocturnal, insectivorous bird characterized by its distinctive long tail. It is found throughout mainland Africa in open areas, arid semi-deserts, and savannas, with common sightings alongside roadways.

== Description ==
The long-tailed nightjar ranges from about 29–43 cm in size and is sexually dimorphic. It has a long, graduated tail, with its size ranging from 200-304 mm in males and 156-256 mm in females. Its plumage is primarily rufous-brown to gray-brown in colour, but has pale bands (white in males, buff in females) across the forewing, as well as along the trailing edge of the flight feathers. The males can also have a white throat patch and brown bills, legs and feet. A sexually immature Long-tailed Nightjar looks more similar to a female, however its plumage tends to be paler.

The identification characteristics of the Long-tailed Nightjar are similar to those of the slender-tailed nightjar (Caprimulgus clarus) and the square-tailed nightjar (Caprimulgus fossii). Specifically, when the long-tailed Nightjar is non-breeding or moulting, their tails can be shorter. However, these species can be distinguished as they tend to occur in non-overlapping geographic areas and also have different songs. The song of the Long-tailed Nightjar is composed of a rapid, higher-pitched and sustained churring, at a frequency of about 42–43 units per second, which is much quicker than both the Slender-tailed Nightjar (7–8.6 units per second) and the Square-tailed nightjar (16–18 units per second). In regions where the slender-tailed nightjar's range geographically overlaps with that of the Long-tailed Nightjar, the two can be distinguished as the long-tailed nightjar's plumage is relatively more red in colour.

The moulting pattern in which the long-tailed nightjar replaces its primary feathers is a typical strategy amongst nightjars, where the primaries are replaced in a descendant manner. However, its secondaries moult in a relatively unusual manner, with two moult centres. One moult centre begins with the outermost secondary feather and moults in an ascendant manner towards the fifth secondary, whereas the second moult centre begins with the ninth secondary and follows a centrifugal moult pattern (outermost to innermost moulting). The moult duration has been estimated to take approximately 70 days. The moult tends to arrest in the mid-winter.

== Taxonomy and systematics ==
Diversity within nightjar species, including the long-tailed nightjar, tends to be high both genetically and morphologically, resulting in many subspecies. There are three recognized geographically distinct subspecies of Long-tailed Nightjar, C. c. climacurus, C. c. sclateri and C. c. nigricans. The subspecies C. c. climacurus can be found from Mauritania to Sudan, eastern Congo and western Ethiopia. C. c. sclateri can be found from Guinea to northwestern Uganda. C. c. nigricans can be found in eastern Sudan and Ethiopia in the Nile Valley. C. c. sclateri has relatively darker and redder plumage, with its tail being dark brown on top and black below. C. c. nigricans has overall very dark plumage, with distinct black colouration on its upper parts interpolated with white specks. Recent reconstructions of the nightjars' phylogeny indicate that the long-tailed nightjar is most closely related to the Square-tailed Nightjar. C. climacurus, alongside C. fossii and C. clarus, were previously classified under a separate genus, known as Scotornis.

== Habitat and distribution ==
The long-tailed nightjar is found in the Afrotropical realm in multiple African countries including Angola, Benin, Burkina Faso, Cameroon, Central African Republic, Chad, Republic of the Congo, Democratic Republic of the Congo, Ivory Coast, Eritrea, Ethiopia, Gabon, Gambia, Ghana, Guinea, Guinea-Bissau, Kenya, Liberia, Mali, Mauritania, Niger, Nigeria, Senegal, Sierra Leone, Sudan, Tanzania, Togo and Uganda. It is found mainly in open areas of the northern Afrotropics. This includes roadsides, savannas, semi-arid deserts and lowland forest clearings. It can often be found in the company of the standard-winged nightjar (Macrodipteryx longipennis).

== Behaviour and ecology ==
=== Reproduction ===
The laying season of the long-tailed nightjar varies depending on geographic location. The laying season is from March to September in Gambia and Senegal, May to August in northern Nigeria, January to October in southern Nigeria, March to August in Mali, March to June in northeastern Congo and February to April or April to June in eastern Africa.

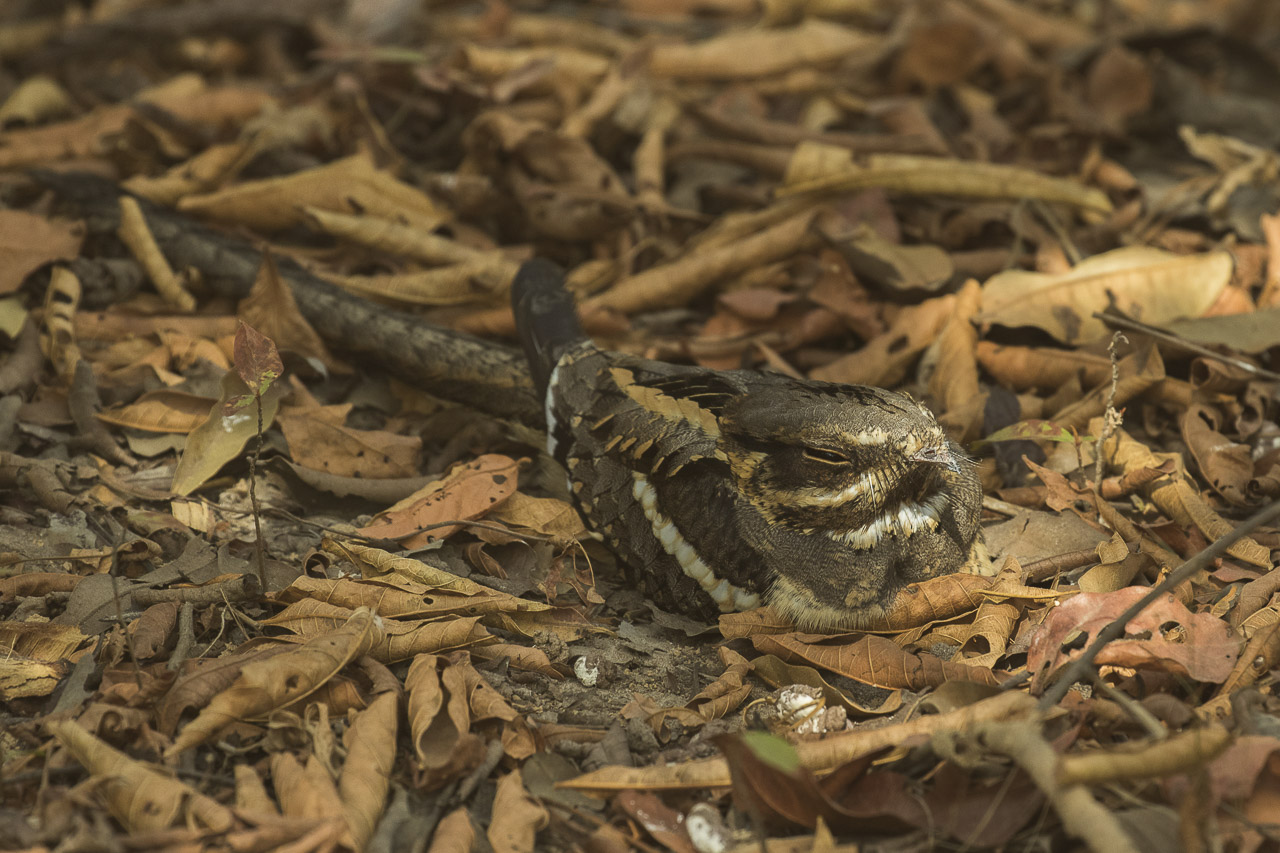
Long-tailed nightjar amongst leaf-litter with its eyes closed to slits.

No nest is built for the eggs, rather a clear patch of land, approximately 4 x 5 cm in size, is chosen. Nest locations include bare land, open soil, sand, clear patches between pebbles or leaf-litter, beside pathways, in a thicket or under small bushes in fields. The clutch size is typically two eggs. The eggs are ellipsoidal in shape, matte in finish and colouration varying from whitish, cream, buff or pinkish – typically matching the ground colour. Additionally, grey, grey-purple and chestnut brown blotches and thick marbling fill in the egg's surface, further aiding with camouflage .The incubating bird tends to rest flat on top of the eggs with its eyelids closed.

=== Diet and feeding ===
Similar to other nightjars, the diet of the long-tailed nightjar predominantly consists of insects. These insects include grasshoppers, ants, beetles, moths and winged termites. The most common feeding grounds for the long-tailed nightjar are areas near cattle trails, horse trails, camel trails, farmland and generally open spaces. Often, it perches on the ground and quickly flies up to catch insect that pass through its visual field. It has also been found to forage over open water or marshland, typically drinking water beforehand. It drinks water by hovering at progressively lower altitudes until it is about 20 cm above the water surface, where it soon after drops to the surface, dips its beak and flies away. When hunting over water or amongst trees, it sustains flight in a straight line, then abruptly swerves or dives for its prey. The Long-tailed nightjar will usually consume its prey while perched on the ground, and will at times exceptionally consume terrestrial (rather than aerial) insects. The long-tailed nightjar also shows an increase in twilight foraging activity near the new moon.

=== Vocalization ===
Relative to other nightjars, the long-tailed nightjar's call is a faster, higher-pitched, prolonged trill. During flight, especially in the process of catching prey, the long-tailed nightjar often produces a "chuck" or "chiow".

== Conservation status ==
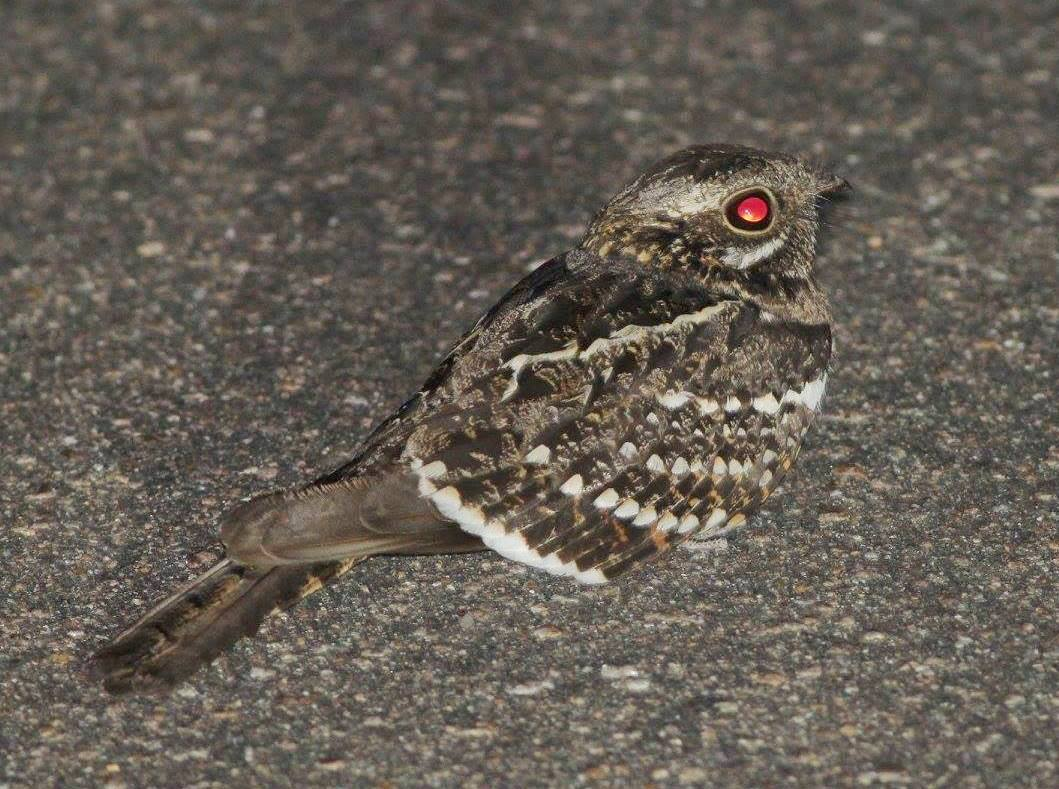
When illuminated by flashlights or automobile headlights, the eyes of long-tailed nightjars distinctively appear red.

The long-tailed nightjar is listed as least concern according to the IUCN Red List. Despite the population size being unknown, it occupies a large range, with its extent of occurrence being estimated at 9 770 000 km^{2}. However, human activity, especially road traffic, has been a major mortality factor for the long-tailed nightjar. The long-tailed nightjar has been found to frequent roads at dusk and night. With increasing road-traffic comes increasing road-related mortality, as the long-tailed nightjar has often been observed as unable to fly out of the way of approaching vehicles in time to escape being struck. Recommended actions to lower their road mortality includes periodically honking the horn, slowing down speeds and flashing the headlights of vehicles.
