= Adulphe Delegorgue =

French explorer, hunter and naturalist

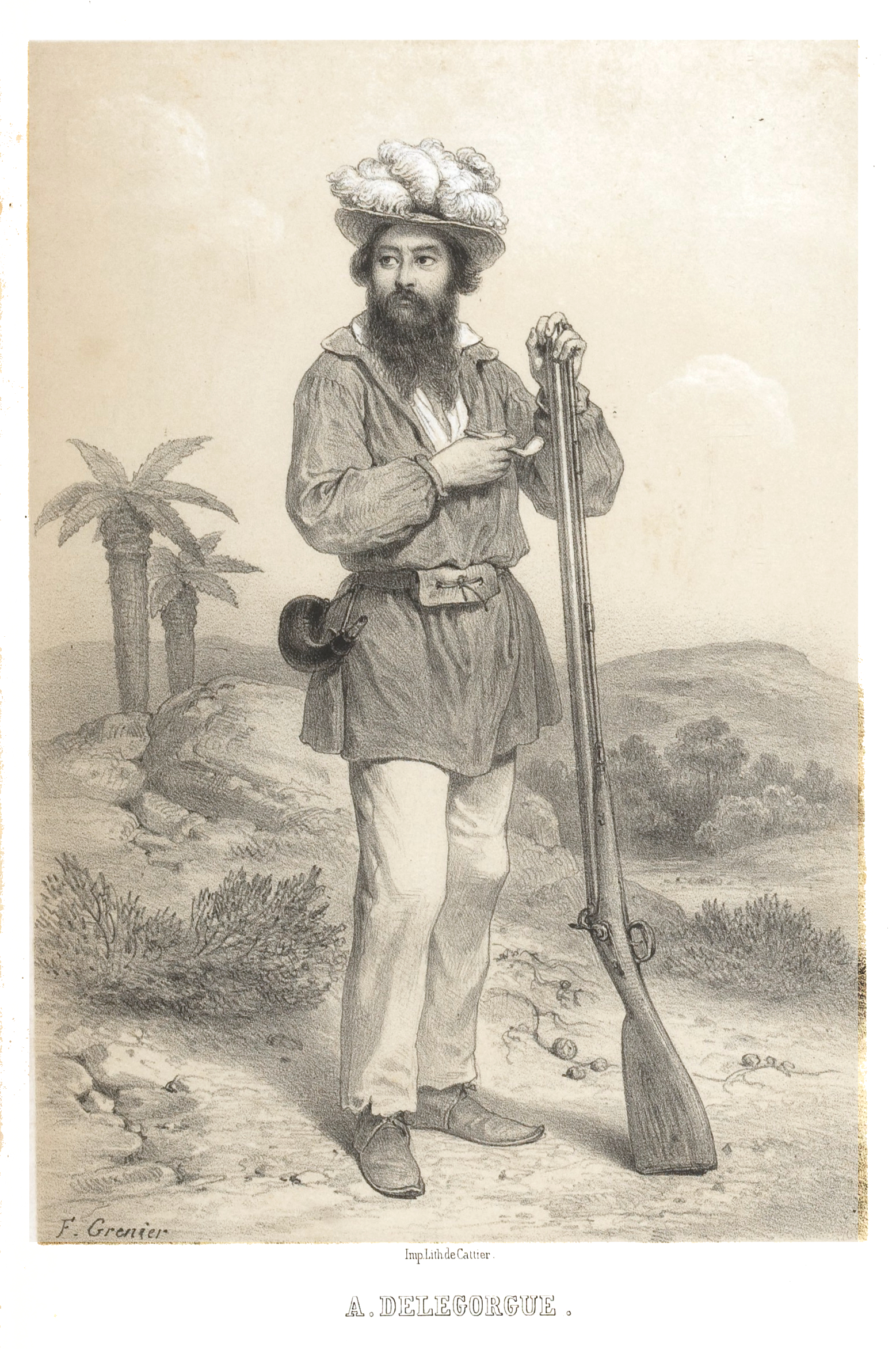
- c. 1847
- Born: Louis Adulphe Delegorgue; 13 November 1814
- Died: 30 May 1850 (aged 35)

Louis Adulphe Delegorgue (13 November 1814 – 30 May 1850) was a French explorer, hunter and naturalist who travelled in southern Africa in the 1840s and wrote about the region.

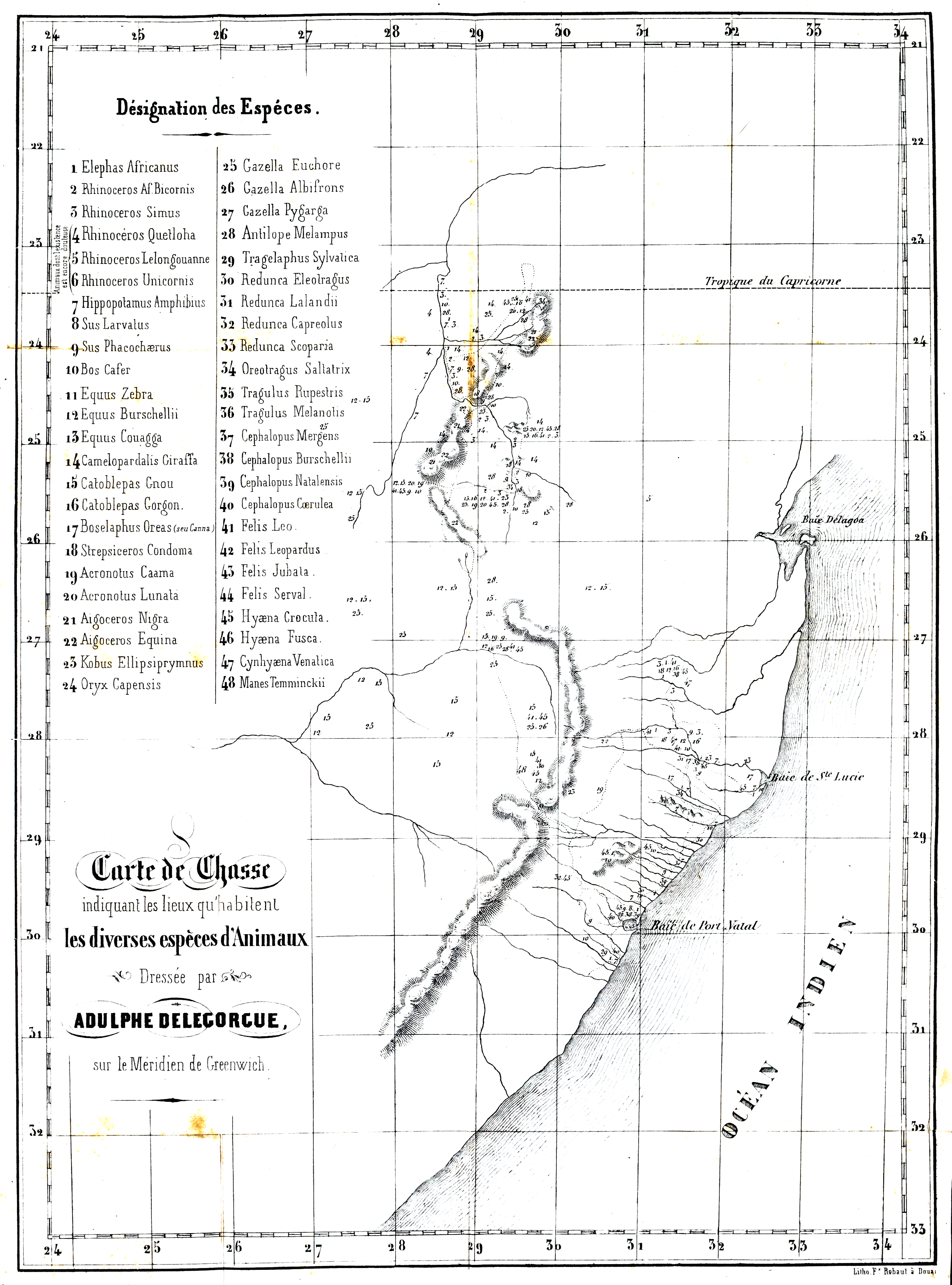
Map of animals hunted

Delegorgue was born to a farmer and mayor of Courcelles, Adulphe and his wife Marie Desfontaine. His parents died when he was very young and he was raised by his grandfather Joseph, a councillor at the court of Douai. At the age of 16 he began to sail around Europe, northern Africa and the Antilles. At the age of 23, inspired by the writings of Le Vaillant, he sailed to the Cape of Good Hope and then travelled through southern Africa along with J.A. Wahlberg and F.C.C. Krauss aboard the Mazeppa. He made trips to southern Africa again in 1841 and in 1842, hunting and collecting artefacts for the museums in Paris and Douai. He hunted hippos, elephants, lions and buffalo and began to write about his adventures in a two volume book published in 1847. The second volume included a glossary of the Zulu language. He travelled again in 1850 to West Africa but died of malaria at sea on ship and was buried at sea. Several species have been named from the specimens he collected including the birds Columba delegorguei, Coturnix delegorguei and the bug Encosternum delegorguei.
