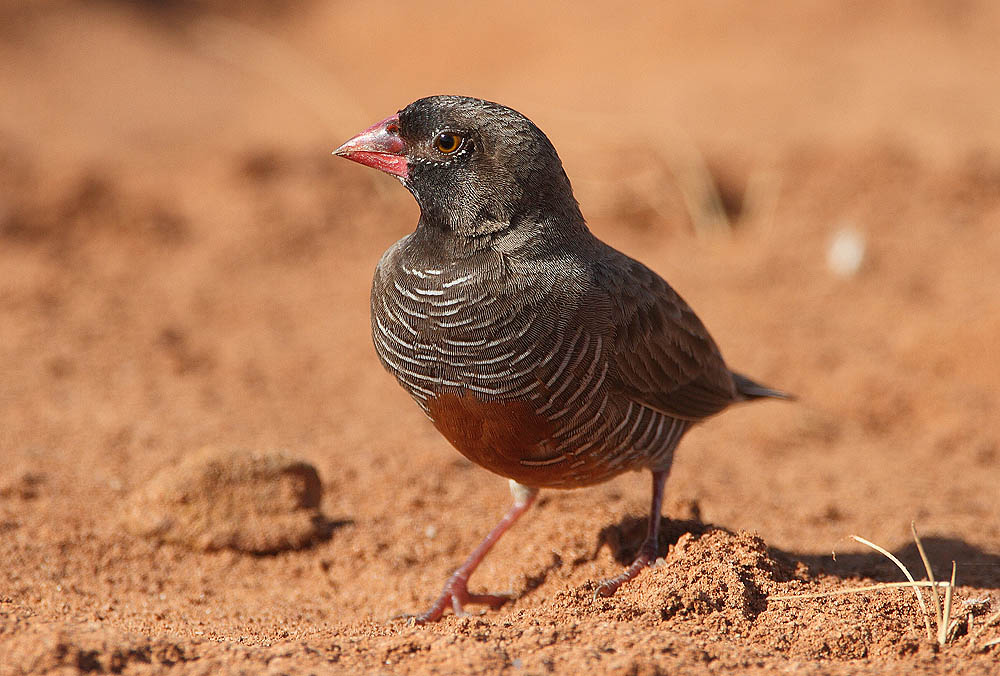
- Adult male African quailfinch (Ortygospiza atricollis fuscocrissa) in breeding plumage, The Gambia

Scientific classification
- Kingdom: Animalia
- Phylum: Chordata
- Class: Aves
- Order: Passeriformes
- Family: Estrildidae
- Genus: Ortygospiza; Sundevall, 1850
- Species: O. atricollis

Binomial name
- Ortygospiza atricollis (Vieillot, 1817)

= Quailfinch =

Genus of birds

The quailfinch (Ortygospiza atricollis) is a species of the estrildid finch. It is found in open grasslands in Africa. They are gregarious seed-eaters with short, thick, red bills. They are very terrestrial, with lark-like feet and claws.

== Taxonomy ==
The quailfinch was formally described in 1817 by the French ornithologist Louis Vieillot based on a specimen collected in Senegal. Vieillot coined the binomial name Fringilla atricollis where the specific epithet is from Latin ater meaning "black" and Modern Latin -collis meaning "-necked" or "-throated". The quailfinch is now the only species placed in the genus Ortygospiza that was introduced in 1850 by Carl Jakob Sundevall. Sundevall created the genus for a single species, Fringilla polyzona Temminck, 1823, which is now treated as a junior synonym of Fringilla atricollis Vieillot, 1817. The genus name Ortygospiza combines the Ancient Greek ορτυξ/ortux, ορτυγος/ortugos meaning "quail" with σπιζα/spiza meaning "finch".

Eleven subspecies are recognised:

- atricollis group
  - O. a. atricollis (Vieillot, 1817) – south Mauritania and Senegal to Chad and Cameroon
  - O. a. ansorgei Ogilvie-Grant, 1910 – Gambia and south Senegal to Togo
  - O. a. ugandae Van Someren, 1921 – south Sudan, Uganda and west Kenya
- fuscocrissa group
  - O. a. fuscocrissa Heuglin, 1863 – Eritrea and Ethiopia
  - O. a. muelleri Zedlitz, 1911 – south Kenya to Angola, Namibia and south Botswana
  - O. a. smithersi Benson, 1955 – northeast Zambia
  - O. a. pallida Roberts, 1932 – north Botswana
  - O. a. digressa Clancey, 1958 – east Zimbabwe, south Mozambique and South Africa
- gabonensis group
  - O. a. gabonensis Lynes, 1914 – Gabon to central DR Congo
  - O. a. fuscata Sclater, WL, 1932 – north Angola, south DR Congo and northwest Zambia
  - O. a. dorsostriata Van Someren, 1921 – east DR Congo and south, west Uganda

Previously, the quailfinch was sometimes divided into three species:

- Black-chinned quailfinch, Ortygospiza gabonensis
- African quailfinch, Ortygospiza fuscocrissa
- Black-faced quailfinch, Ortygospiza atricollis

Two issues are contentious: First, whether the locustfinch should be included here or given its own monotypic genus. Second, the "African quailfinch" complex might comprise one or three (sub)species. The two-taxon arrangement as found in most field guides and used by the IUCN, was recently shown to be based only on a single character (the color of the chin and throat). It is certainly erroneous, being contradicted by all other morphological, behavioral and DNA sequence data.

The molecular data would support a two-taxon arrangement with the taxa atricollis and fuscocrissa, but this is not supported by the other data. In conclusion, either gabonensis should be merged back into atricollis, or fuscocrissa should be restored to (sub)species status. Gene flow in the "African quailfinch" complex is still ongoing, and the three lineages therein either form a superspecies, or can be considered a single, wide-ranging and very variable species.

The locust finch (Paludipasser locustella) has sometimes been placed in the genus Ortygospiza. Its relationships are still uncertain as the species was not included in a large molecular phylogenetic study of the Estrildidae that was published in 2020.

== Description ==
The quailfinch is 9–10 cm (3.5–3.9 in) in overall length and weighs 9–12.4 g (0.32–0.44 oz). The male of the nominate subspecies is grey-brown above with a brown tail and wings. The face is black except for a small white patch on the chin. There is an incomplete ring of white feathers around the eye. The throat is black, the upper breast and sides are black with grey and white barring. The lower breast is chestnut, the belly is paler, the undertail-coverts are whitish with black bars. The bill is red in the breeding season but outside the breeding season the upper mandible is black. The legs are bright orange or pinkish. The female has a grey face, less streaking on the upperparts and less barring on the sides.

== Behaviour ==
=== Breeding ===
The ball shaped nest is placed on the ground in short vegetation. It is built by both sexes and is about 10 cm (3.9 in) in diameter. The clutch is from 3 to 6 eggs which measure 15.4 mm × 11.3 mm (0.61 in × 0.44 in) and weigh 1 g (0.035 oz). The eggs are incubated by both sexes and hatch after 14 days. The chicks are fed and cared for by both parents and fledge after around 17 days.
