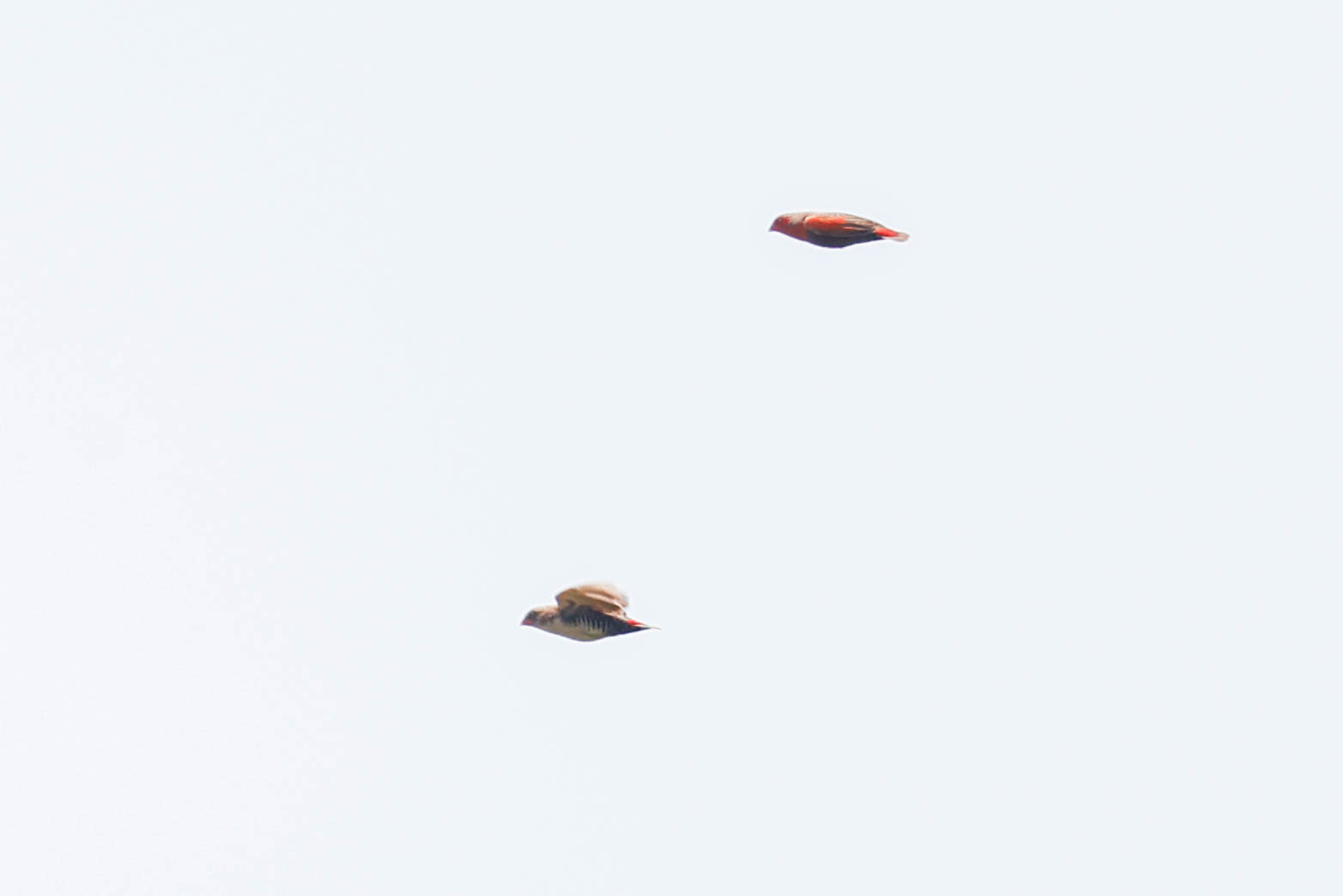
- A couple in flight (male above female).

Conservation status
- Least Concern (IUCN 3.1)

Scientific classification
- Kingdom: Animalia
- Phylum: Chordata
- Class: Aves
- Order: Passeriformes
- Family: Estrildidae
- Genus: Paludipasser; Neave, 1909
- Species: P. locustella

Binomial name
- Paludipasser locustella Neave, 1909

Synonyms
- Ortygospiza locustella (Neave, 1909); Paludipasser irisae Roberts, 1934

= Locust finch =

Species of bird

The locust finch or locustfinch (Paludipasser locustella) is a species of waxbill found in south-central and south-eastern Africa. It is the only species in the genus Paludipasser. It is sometimes placed in the genus Ortygospiza.

== Taxonomy ==
The locust finch was first formally described in 1909 by the English naturalist and entomologist Sheffield Airey Neave with the type, a subadult male, being collected at the Upper Luansenshi River, north-east of Bangweolo, Northern Rhodesia, i.e. Zambia. Neave placed it in the monotypic genus Paludipasser within the waxbill family Estrildidae, but it has also been placed in the same genus as the quailfinch, Ortygospiza.

== Description ==
The locust finch is similar to the quailfinch but males have a red face, throat and breast with rufous wings and black body with white spots but with a plain back belly. The females also have rufous wings and lack the white face markings of female quailfinches while immatures have black and brown streaks on the upperparts and browner underparts than females. This species has a body which is 9 to 10 cm (3.5 to 3.9 in) in length.

== Distribution and habitat ==
It is mainly native to the Uele River basin, Zambia and Malawi. The locust finch has been recorded in south-east Cameroon, Republic of Congo, the Democratic Republic of Congo south through Zambia, Angola, Tanzania, Malawi, Mozambique, Zimbabwe and Botswana. In Botswana, Zimbabwe and Mozambique this is a rather rare species. There are unconfirmed reports of at least two pairs breeding on the Jos Plateau of northern Nigeria, this would be a very significant range extension for this species. The preferred habitat is damp, thinly vegetated patches within grasslands close to water in sandy spoild areas, like sandveld.

== Biology ==
The locust finch is a terrestrial species and perching is almost unknown. Its preferred habitat as prone to drying out in the dry season and at these times these birds can be nomadic. They are normally encountered in pairs but when drought conditions are severe they can gather in small flock of up to 10 birds. In southern Africa eggs are laid from January to May, i.e. during the rainy season with most egg laying at the height of the rainy season in January and February. This is a difficult species to locate due to its terrestrial habits and tendency to fly long distances when flushed, like a quail.

== Threats ==
The locust finch was previously listed as near threatened. However, due to lack of information, it was suggested that it remains widespread and locally common, and there is no evidence of significant declines. The population of this species may have declined for the past few decades due to a series of droughts in the 1980s. It is threatened by the cage-bird trade and loss of marshland habitat, partly due to dry periods.
