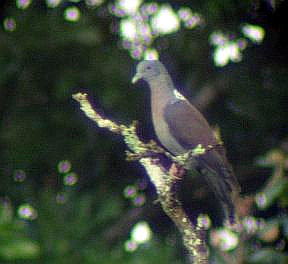
- A male eastern bronze-naped pigeon, Dlinza Forest, Eshowe, KwaZulu-Natal, South Africa

Scientific classification
- Domain: Eukaryota
- Kingdom: Animalia
- Phylum: Chordata
- Class: Aves
- Order: Columbiformes
- Family: Columbidae
- Genus: Columba
- Subgenus: Turturoena

= Turturoena =

Bronze-naped pigeon

Subgenus of birds

Turturoena, commonly called bronze-naped pigeon, is a pigeon subgenus comprising three species: the eastern bronze-naped pigeon, the western bronze-naped pigeon, and the São Tomé bronze-naped pigeon.
