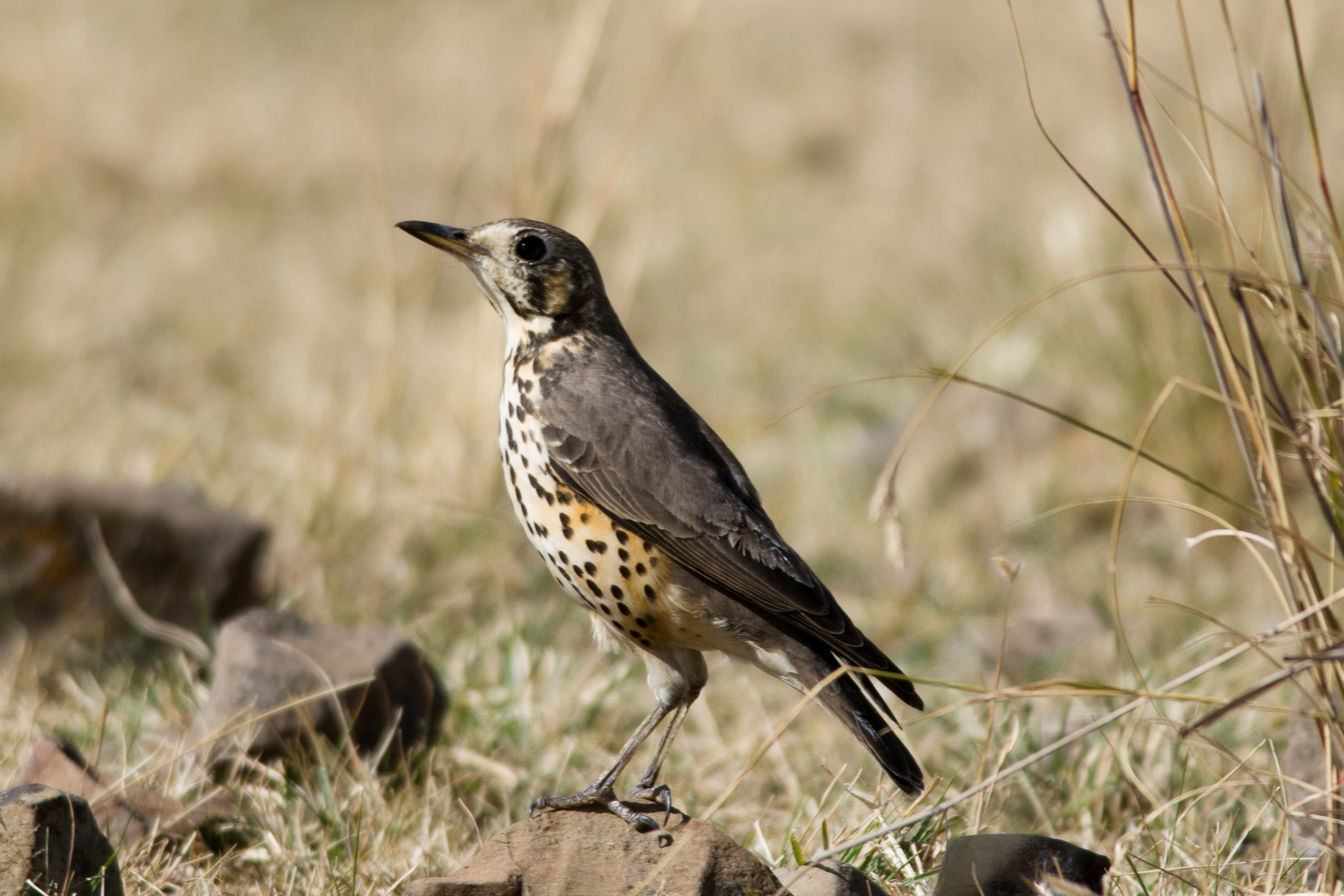
- In Sululta, Ethiopia

Conservation status
- Least Concern (IUCN 3.1)

Scientific classification
- Kingdom: Animalia
- Phylum: Chordata
- Class: Aves
- Order: Passeriformes
- Family: Turdidae
- Genus: Turdus
- Species: T. simensis

Binomial name
- Turdus simensis (Rüppell, 1837)

Synonyms
- Psophocichla simensis Psophocichla litsitsirupa simensis Turdus litsitsirupa simensis

= Ethiopian thrush =

Species of bird

The Ethiopian thrush (Turdus simensis) is a species of bird in the family Turdidae. It is found primarily in Ethiopia, and also locally in Eritrea. It is a medium-sized thrush 20–22 cm long, with a brown back, two vertical dark brown bars on the face, a spotted breast and belly, and (for a thrush) an unusually short tail. Compared to the closely related groundscraper thrush (T. litsitsirupa) from further south in Africa, it is browner, less grey-coloured above, and has a less marked (though still obvious) face pattern.

== Taxonomy ==
The Ethiopian thrush was formally described in 1837 by the German naturalist Eduard Rüppell from a specimen collected in northern Ethiopia. He used the scientific name Merula (Turdus) simensis. The specific epithet is from the type locality, the Simien Mountains.

This thrush was formerly often considered a subspecies of the groundscraper thrush. These two species, each other's closest relatives, are treated in a separate genus Psophocichla by some authors.
