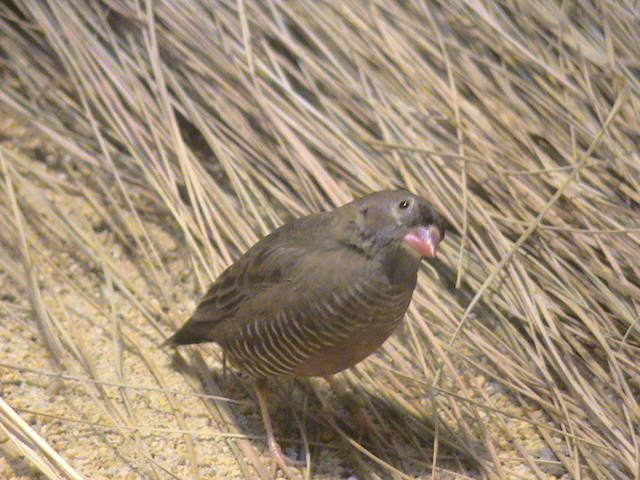

Scientific classification
- Kingdom: Animalia
- Phylum: Chordata
- Class: Aves
- Order: Passeriformes
- Family: Estrildidae
- Genus: Ortygospiza
- Species: O. atricollis
- Subspecies: O. a. gabonensis

Trinomial name
- Ortygospiza atricollis gabonensis Lynes, 1914

= Black-chinned quailfinch =

Subspecies of bird

The black-chinned quailfinch (Ortygospiza atricollis gabonensis) also known as the red-billed quailfinch, is a common subspecies of estrildid finch found in central Africa. It has an estimated global extent of occurrence of 450,000 km^{2}. It is found in Angola, Burundi, the Republic of Congo, the Democratic Republic of the Congo, Equatorial Guinea, Gabon, Rwanda, Tanzania and Zambia. The IUCN has classified the species as being of least concern. Some taxonomists consider it to be conspecific with the other species of quailfinch.
