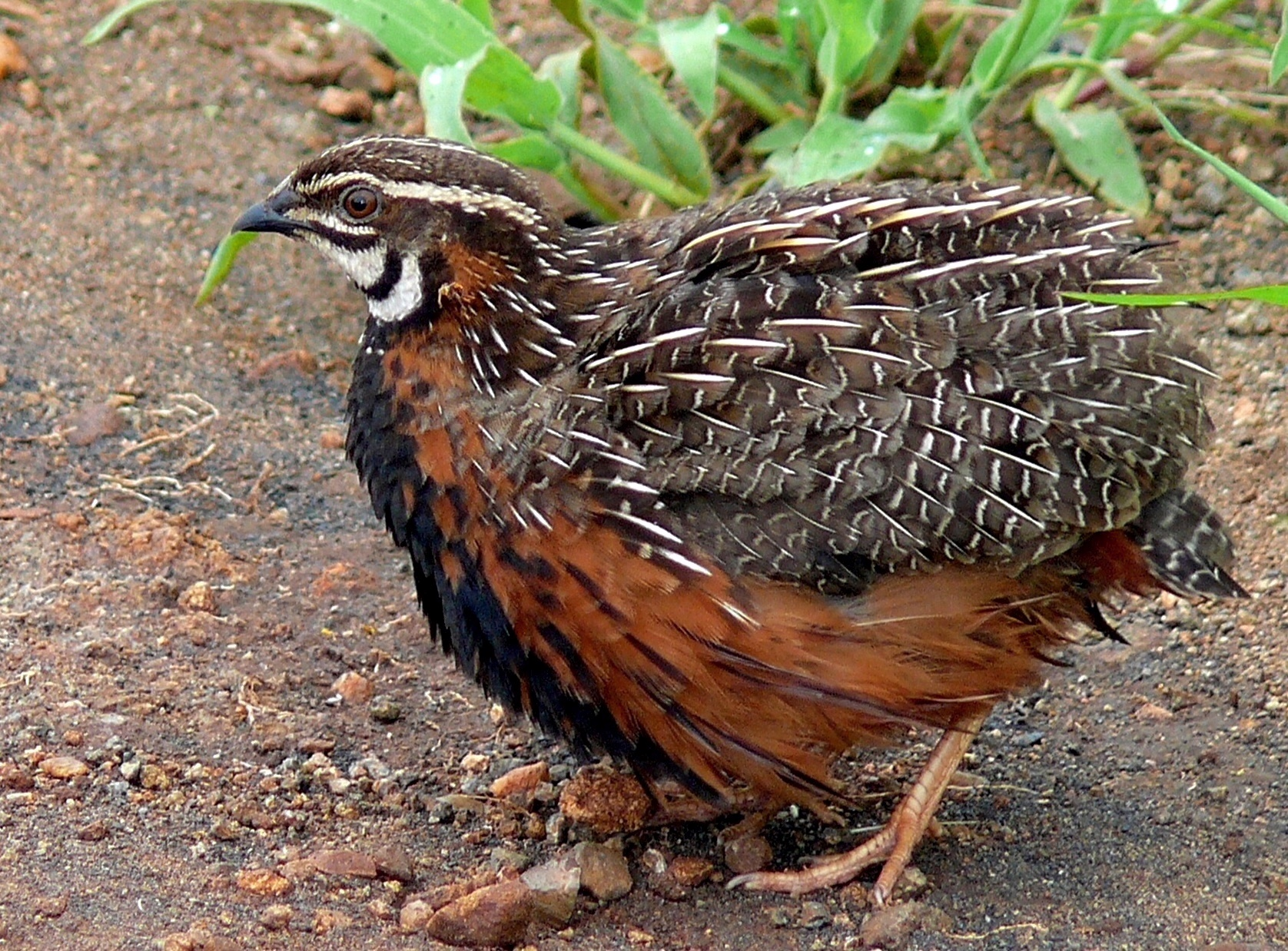

Conservation status
- Least Concern (IUCN 3.1)

Scientific classification
- Kingdom: Animalia
- Phylum: Chordata
- Class: Aves
- Order: Galliformes
- Family: Phasianidae
- Genus: Coturnix
- Species: C. delegorguei

Binomial name
- Coturnix delegorguei Delegorgue, 1847

Synonyms
- Coturnix fornasini Bianconi 1865

= Harlequin quail =

Species of bird

The harlequin quail (Coturnix delegorguei) is a species of bird in the family Phasianidae. It occurs in sub-Saharan Africa and in the Arabian Peninsula. The species is named after the collector, Adulphe Delegorgue.

== Taxonomy ==
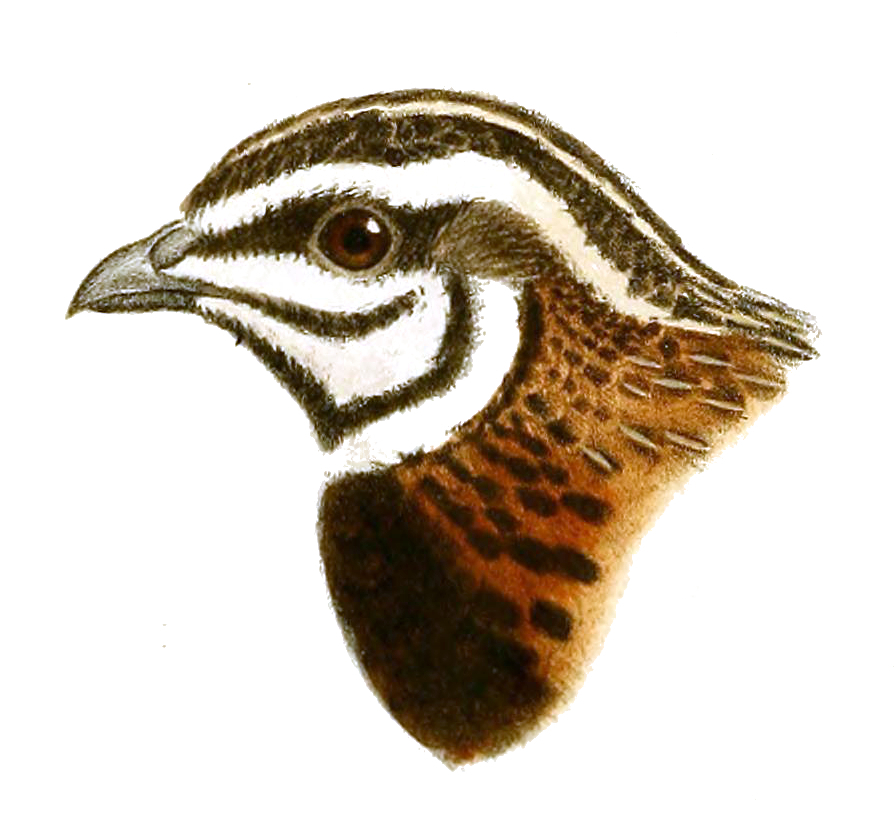
Drawing of the head

There are three subspecies:

- C. d. arabica Bannerman, 1929 – Southwest Arabian Peninsula
- C. d. delegorguei Delegorgue, 1847 – Sub-Saharan Africa and Madagascar
- C. d. histrionica Hartlaub, 1849 – São Tomé Island, Gulf of Guinea

== Introductions ==
The uncontrolled introduction of domestic Japanese quail breeds into Kenya, as well as a noticeable population size reduction of wild African harlequin quail numbers in parts of Western Kenya has been reported.
