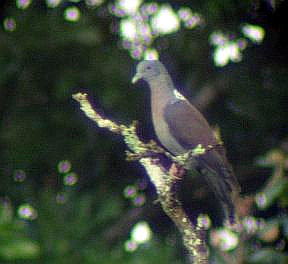
- A male, Dlinza Forest, Eshowe, KwaZulu-Natal, South Africa

Conservation status
- Least Concern (IUCN 3.1)

Scientific classification
- Kingdom: Animalia
- Phylum: Chordata
- Class: Aves
- Order: Columbiformes
- Family: Columbidae
- Genus: Columba
- Species: C. delegorguei

Binomial name
- Columba delegorguei Delegorgue, 1847

Synonyms
- Turturoena delegorguei; Turturoena sharpei

= Eastern bronze-naped pigeon =

Species of bird

The eastern bronze-naped pigeon (Columba delegorguei), also known as Delegorgue's pigeon, is a species of bird in the family Columbidae. It is found in Angola, Kenya, Malawi, Mozambique, South Africa, South Sudan, Tanzania, Uganda, Zambia, and Zimbabwe. It is part of the Turturoena subgenus. The species is named after the collector, Adulphe Delegorgue.

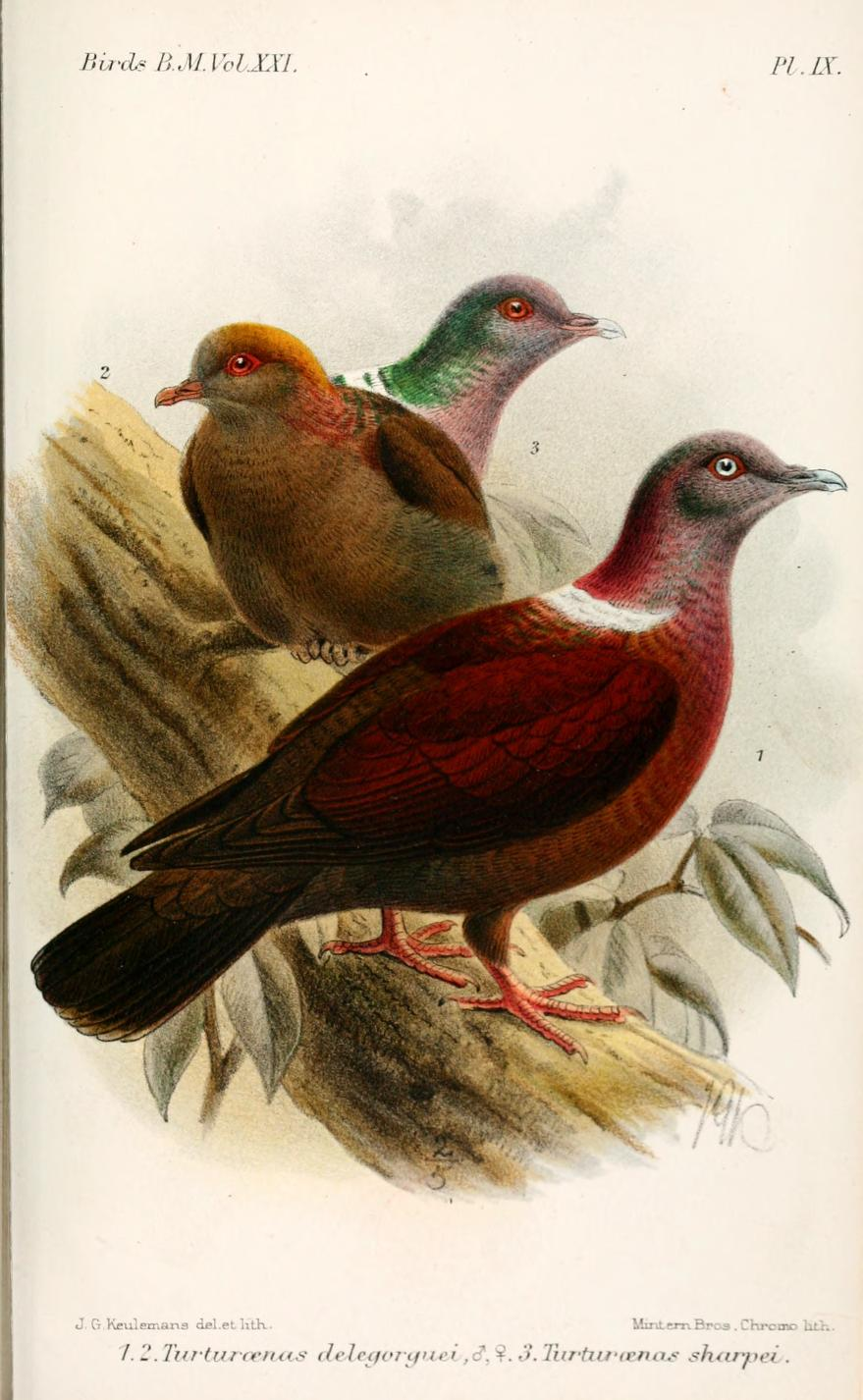
C. d. delegorguei, male in front, female in the middle, and C. d. sharpei (behind)
