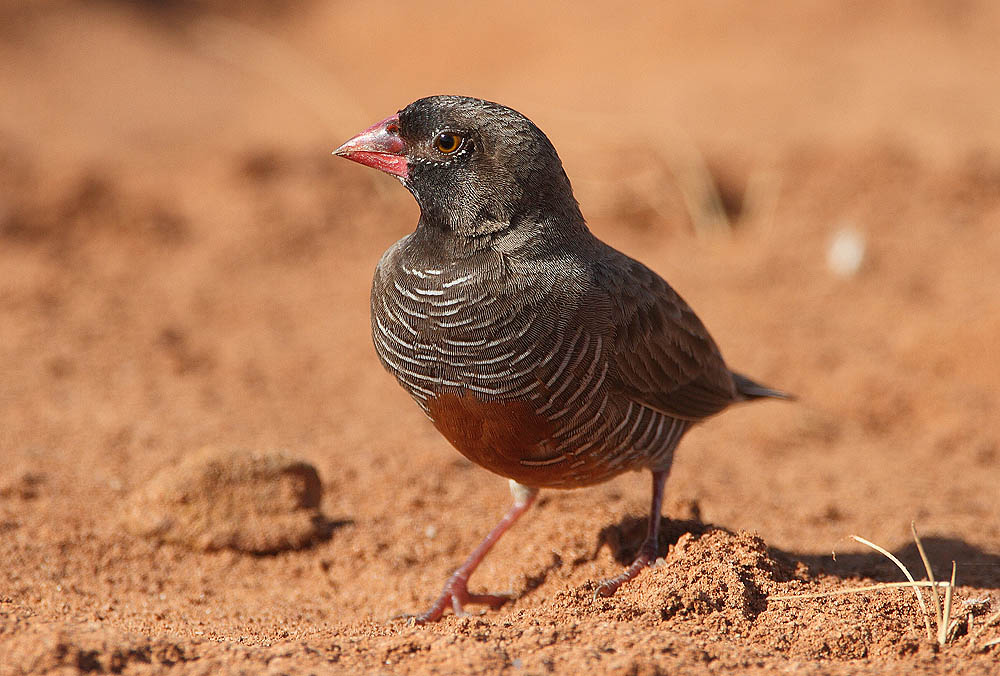
- Adult male in breeding plumage, The Gambia

Conservation status
- Least Concern (IUCN 3.1)

Scientific classification
- Kingdom: Animalia
- Phylum: Chordata
- Class: Aves
- Order: Passeriformes
- Family: Estrildidae
- Genus: Ortygospiza
- Species: O. atricollis
- Subspecies: O. a. atricollis

Trinomial name
- Ortygospiza atricollis atricollis (Vieillot, 1817)

= Black-faced quailfinch =

Subspecies of bird

The black-faced quailfinch (Ortygospiza atricollis atricollis), is a common subspecies of estrildid finch found in western and central of Africa. Some taxonomists consider it to be conspecific with the African quailfinch, others consider all three species to be conspecific.
