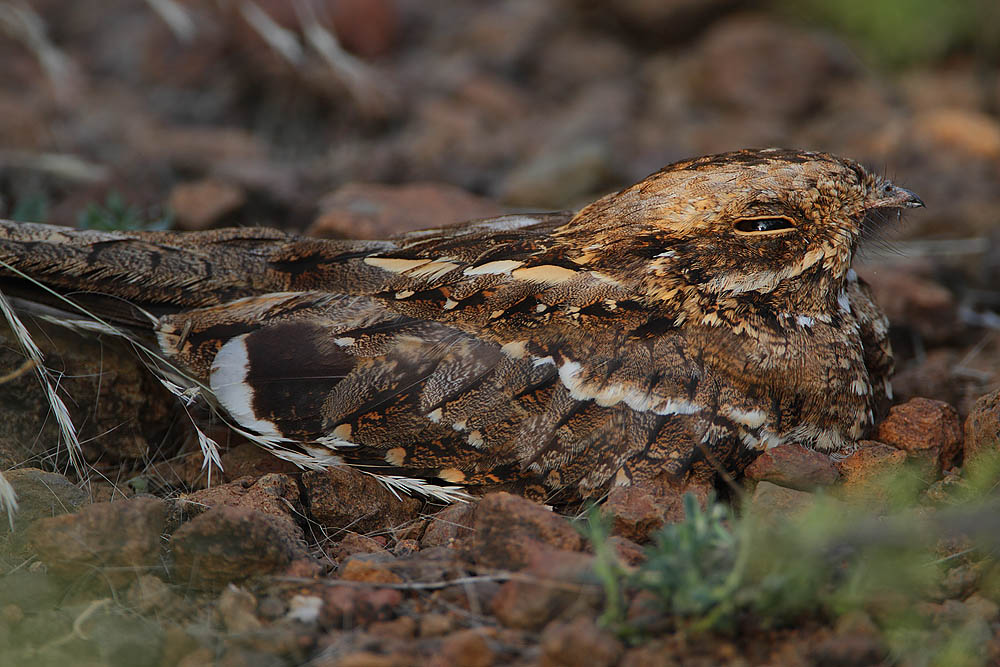
- Roosting on the ground near Lake Baringo, Kenya

Conservation status
- Least Concern (IUCN 3.1)

Scientific classification
- Kingdom: Animalia
- Phylum: Chordata
- Class: Aves
- Order: Caprimulgiformes
- Family: Caprimulgidae
- Genus: Caprimulgus
- Species: C. clarus

Binomial name
- Caprimulgus clarus Reichenow, 1892

= Slender-tailed nightjar =

Species of bird

The slender-tailed nightjar (Caprimulgus clarus) is a species of nightjar in the family Caprimulgidae. It is found in parts of eastern and central Africa, including the Democratic Republic of the Congo, Ethiopia, Kenya, Somalia, South Sudan, Tanzania, and Uganda.

== Description ==
The slender-tailed nightjar is a medium-sized nightjar, measuring approximately 25–28 cm in length. It has cryptically patterned brown, grey, and black plumage, providing effective camouflage against dry ground and leaf litter. The head is relatively large and flattened, with a small bill and a very wide gape adapted for catching insects in flight. The tail is long and tapered, with the central feathers extending beyond the others, giving rise to the species’ common name.

Sexes are similar in appearance, though males may show slightly more prominent pale patches on the wings. No subspecies are currently recognized.

== Distribution and habitat ==
The species is distributed across eastern and parts of central Africa. It inhabits dry, open environments including savanna, dry woodland, bushland, open scrub, rocky areas, and sparsely vegetated grassland. It is often associated with semi-arid regions and may occur near water sources.

The slender-tailed nightjar is generally resident throughout its range, with no evidence of long-distance migration.

== Behavior and ecology ==
The slender-tailed nightjar is nocturnal and insectivorous. It forages mainly at dusk and during the night, capturing flying insects such as moths and beetles on the wing. During the day, it roosts on the ground or low branches, relying on its cryptic plumage for concealment.

Breeding biology is poorly documented, but it is presumed to be similar to other members of the genus Caprimulgus. Eggs are laid directly on bare ground without a constructed nest, usually in a shallow scrape among leaf litter or stones. Vocalizations include churring calls typical of nightjars, most often heard at dusk and during the night.

== Conservation ==
The slender-tailed nightjar is assessed as Least Concern by the International Union for Conservation of Nature due to its wide distribution and presumed large and stable population. No major threats have been identified at a global scale, although localized habitat degradation may affect some populations. The species occurs in several protected areas across its range.
