= List of birds of Gauteng =

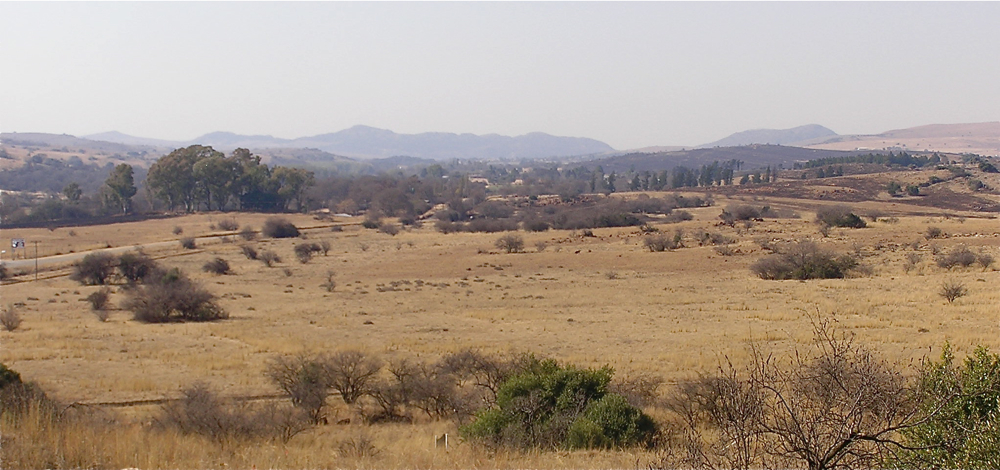
Typical Gauteng Highveld in winter

Location of Gauteng in South Africa

This is a list of common names of birds occurring in Gauteng, South Africa. Gauteng includes both the cities of Johannesburg and Pretoria, and numerous satellite municipalities spreading over a total of some 18,000 square km and an enormous diversity of habitat, and ranging in elevation from 1300 to 1900 metres. Gauteng lies at the junction of three major biomes – grassland to the south, arid savannah to the north-west, and moist savannah to the north-east and east – this location largely accounts for its great diversity of species.

The growing occupation of the area by man since the discovery of gold in the late 1800s has led to inevitable habitat loss and degradation, with the consequent displacement and decline of many species. The establishing of parks and suburban gardens, on the other hand, has created a multitude of niches and this, together with progressively milder highveld winters, has attracted a wealth of bushveld species from north of the Magaliesberg, and from other warmer areas. Tall office blocks and high-rise apartments have provided nesting opportunities for cliff dwellers, while the collective, man-made forest is regarded as the world's largest. Some arrivals in Johannesburg gardens within recent times have been the hadeda ibis, green wood hoopoe, Cape starling, red-winged starling, grey go-away-bird, African grey hornbill, pin-tailed whydah, African green pigeon and southern boubou.

The avifauna of Gauteng included a total of 606 species, as of October 2022.

This list's taxonomic treatment (designation and sequence of orders, families and species) and nomenclature (English and scientific names) are those of The Clements Checklist of Birds of the World, 2022 edition.

The following tags highlight several categories of occurrence other than regular migrants and residents:

- (A) Accidental – a species which has been recorded 10 or fewer times in Gauteng
- (I) Introduced – a species introduced to Gauteng as a consequence, direct or indirect, of human actions, and which has a self-sustaining population.

== Ostriches ==
Order: Struthioniformes Family: Struthionidae

The ostriches are flightless birds native to Africa, and are the largest living species of bird. They are distinctive in their appearance, with a long neck and legs with the ability to run at high speeds.

- Common ostrich, Struthio camelus
  - South African ostrich, S. c. australis

== Ducks, geese, and waterfowl ==
Order: Anseriformes Family: Anatidae

Anatidae includes the ducks and most duck-like waterfowl, such as geese and swans. These birds are adapted to an aquatic existence with webbed feet, flattened bills, and feathers that are excellent at shedding water due to an oily coating.

- White-faced whistling-duck, Dendrocygna viduata
- Fulvous whistling-duck, Dendrocygna bicolor
- White-backed duck, Thalassornis leuconotus
- Knob-billed duck, Sarkidiornis melanotos
- Egyptian goose, Alopochen aegyptiacus
- South African shelduck, Tadorna cana
- Spur-winged goose, Plectropterus gambensis
- African pygmy-goose, Nettapus auritus
- Garganey, Spatula querquedula (A)
- Blue-billed teal, Spatula hottentota
- Cape shoveler, Spatula smithii
- African black duck, Anas sparsa
- Yellow-billed duck, Anas undulata
- Mallard, Anas platyrhynchos (I)
- Cape teal, Anas capensis
- Red-billed duck, Anas erythrorhyncha
- Northern pintail, Anas acuta (A)
- Southern pochard, Netta erythrophthalma
- Maccoa duck, Oxyura maccoa

== Guineafowl ==
Order: Galliformes Family: Numididae

Guineafowl are a group of African, seed-eating, ground-nesting birds that resemble partridges, but with featherless heads and spangled grey plumage.

- Helmeted guineafowl, Numida meleagris
- Southern crested guineafowl, Guttera edouardi (A)

== Pheasants, grouse, and allies ==
Order: Galliformes Family: Phasianidae

The Phasianidae are a family of terrestrial birds which consists of quails, partridges, snowcocks, francolins, spurfowls, tragopans, monals, pheasants, peafowls, and jungle fowls. In general, they are plump (although they vary in size) and have broad, relatively short wings.

- Crested francolin, Ortygornis sephaena
- Coqui francolin, Campocolinus coqui
- Red-winged francolin, Scleroptila levaillantii
- Gray-winged francolin, Scleroptila afra
- Orange River francolin, Scleroptila gutturalis
- Shelley's francolin, Scleroptila shelleyi
- Common quail, Coturnix coturnix
- Harlequin quail, Coturnix delegorguei
- Natal francolin, Pternistis natalensis
- Swainson's francolin, Pternistis swainsonii

== Flamingos ==
Order: Phoenicopteriformes Family: Phoenicopteridae

Flamingos are gregarious wading birds, usually 3 to 5 feet (0.9 to 1.5 m) tall, found in both the Western and Eastern Hemispheres. Flamingos filter-feed on shellfish and algae. Their oddly shaped beaks are specially adapted to separate mud and silt from the food they consume and, uniquely, are used upside-down.

- Greater flamingo, Phoenicopterus roseus
- Lesser flamingo, Phoeniconaias minor

== Grebes ==
Order: Podicipediformes Family: Podicipedidae

Grebes are small to medium-large freshwater diving birds. They have lobed toes and are excellent swimmers and divers. However, they have their feet placed far back on the body, making them quite ungainly on land.

- Little grebe, Tachybaptus ruficollis
- Great crested grebe, Podiceps cristatus
- Eared grebe, Podiceps nigricollis

== Pigeons and doves ==
Order: Columbiformes Family: Columbidae

Pigeons and doves are stout-bodied birds with short necks and short slender bills with a fleshy cere.

- Rock pigeon, Columba livia (I)
- Speckled pigeon, Columba guinea
- Rameron pigeon, Columba arquatrix
- Lemon dove, Columba larvata
- Red-eyed dove, Streptopelia semitorquata
- Ring-necked dove, Streptopelia capicola
- Laughing dove, Streptopelia senegalensis
- Emerald-spotted wood-dove, Turtur chalcospilos
- Blue-spotted wood-dove, Turtur afer
- Namaqua dove, Oena capensis
- African green-pigeon, Treron calva

== Sandgrouse ==
Order: Pterocliformes Family: Pteroclidae

Sandgrouse have small pigeon-like heads and necks, but sturdy compact bodies. They have long pointed wings and sometimes tails and a fast direct flight. Flocks fly to watering holes at dawn and dusk. Their legs are feathered down to the toes.

- Namaqua sandgrouse, Pterocles namaqua
- Yellow-throated sandgrouse, Pterocles gutturalis
- Double-banded sandgrouse, Pterocles bicinctus
- Burchell's sandgrouse, Pterocles burchelli

== Bustards ==
Order: Otidiformes Family: Otididae

Bustards are large terrestrial birds mainly associated with dry open country and steppes in the Old World. They are omnivorous and nest on the ground. They walk steadily on strong legs and big toes, pecking for food as they go. They have long broad wings with "fingered" wingtips and striking patterns in flight. Many have interesting mating displays.

- Denham's bustard, Neotis denhami
- White-bellied bustard, Eupodotis senegalensis
- Blue bustard, Eupodotis caerulescens
- Red-crested bustard, Eupodotis ruficrista
- White-quilled bustard, Eupodotis afraoides
- Black-bellied bustard, Lissotis melanogaster (A)

== Turacos ==
Order: Musophagiformes Family: Musophagidae

The turacos, plantain eaters, and go-away-birds make up the bird family Musophagidae. They are medium-sized arboreal birds. The turacos and plantain eaters are brightly coloured, usually in blue, green, or purple. The go-away birds are mostly grey and white.

- Knysna turaco, Tauraco corythaix
- Purple-crested turaco, Tauraco porphyreolophus
- Gray go-away-bird, Corythaixoides concolor

== Cuckoos ==
Order: Cuculiformes Family: Cuculidae

The family Cuculidae includes cuckoos, roadrunners, and anis. These birds are of variable size with slender bodies, long tails, and strong legs.

- White-browed coucal, Centropus superciliosus
- Black coucal, Centropus grillii (A)
- Great spotted cuckoo, Clamator glandarius
- Levaillant's cuckoo, Clamator levaillantii
- Pied cuckoo, Clamator jacobinus
- Thick-billed cuckoo, Pachycoccyx audeberti (B)
- Dideric cuckoo, Chrysococcyx caprius
- Klaas's cuckoo, Chrysococcyx klaas
- African emerald cuckoo, Chrysococcyx cupreus (B)
- Black cuckoo, Cuculus clamosus
- Red-chested cuckoo, Cuculus solitarius
- African cuckoo, Cuculus gularis
- Common cuckoo, Cuculus canorus (B)

== Nightjars and allies ==
Order: Caprimulgiformes Family: Caprimulgidae

Nightjars are medium-sized nocturnal birds that usually nest on the ground. They have long wings, short legs, and very short bills. Most have small feet, of little use for walking, and long pointed wings. Their soft plumage is camouflaged to resemble bark or leaves.

- Pennant-winged nightjar, Caprimulgus vexillarius
- Eurasian nightjar, Caprimulgus europaeus
- Rufous-cheeked nightjar, Caprimulgus rufigena
- Fiery-necked nightjar, Caprimulgus pectoralis
- Freckled nightjar, Caprimulgus tristigma
- Square-tailed nightjar, Caprimulgus fossii

== Swifts ==
Order: Caprimulgiformes Family: Apodidae

Swifts are small birds which spend the majority of their lives flying. These birds have very short legs and never settle voluntarily on the ground, perching instead only on vertical surfaces. Many swifts have long swept-back wings which resemble a crescent or boomerang.

- Alpine swift, Apus melba
- Common swift, Apus apus
- African swift, Apus barbatus
- Little swift, Apus affinis
- Horus swift, Apus horus
- White-rumped swift, Apus caffer
- African palm-swift, Cypsiurus parvus

== Flufftails ==
Order: Gruiformes Family: Sarothruridae

The flufftails are a small family of ground-dwelling birds found only in Madagascar and sub-Saharan Africa.

- Buff-spotted flufftail, Sarothrura elegans
- Red-chested flufftail, Sarothrura rufa
- White-winged flufftail, Sarothrura ayresi (A)

== Rails, gallinules, and coots ==
Order: Gruiformes Family: Rallidae

Rallidae is a large family of small to medium-sized birds which includes the rails, crakes, coots, and gallinules. Typically they inhabit dense vegetation in damp environments near lakes, swamps, or rivers. In general they are shy and secretive birds, making them difficult to observe. Most species have strong legs and long toes which are well adapted to soft uneven surfaces. They tend to have short, rounded wings and to be weak fliers.

- African rail, Rallus caerulescens
- Corn crake, Crex crex
- African crake, Crex egregia
- Spotted crake, Porzana porzana (A)
- Lesser moorhen, Paragallinula angulata
- Eurasian moorhen, Gallinula chloropus
- Red-knobbed coot, Fulica cristata
- Allen's gallinule, Porphyrio alleni (A)
- African swamphen, Porphyrio madagascariensis
- Striped crake, Amaurornis marginalis
- Black crake, Zapornia flavirostra
- Baillon's crake, Zapornia pusilla (A)

== Finfoots ==
Order: Gruiformes Family: Heliornithidae

Heliornithidae is a small family of tropical birds with webbed lobes on their feet similar to those of grebes and coots.

- African finfoot, Podica senegalensis

== Cranes ==
Order: Gruiformes Family: Gruidae

Cranes are large, long-legged, and long-necked birds. Unlike the similar-looking but unrelated herons, cranes fly with necks outstretched, not pulled back. Most have elaborate and noisy courting displays or "dances".

- Gray crowned-crane, Balearica regulorum
- Blue crane, Anthropoides paradiseus
- Wattled crane, Bugeranus carunculatus (A)

== Thick-knees ==
Order: Charadriiformes Family: Burhinidae

The thick-knees are a group of waders found worldwide within the tropical zone, with some species also breeding in temperate Europe and Australia. They are medium to large waders with strong black or yellow-black bills, large yellow eyes, and cryptic plumage. Despite being classed as waders, most species have a preference for arid or semi-arid habitats.

- Water thick-knee, Burhinus vermiculatus (A)
- Spotted thick-knee, Burhinus capensis

== Stilts and avocets ==
Order: Charadriiformes Family: Recurvirostridae

Recurvirostridae is a family of large wading birds, which includes the avocets and stilts. The avocets have long legs and long up-curved bills. The stilts have extremely long legs and long, thin, straight bills.

- Black-winged stilt, Himantopus himantopus
- Pied avocet, Recurvirostra avosetta

== Plovers and lapwings ==
Order: Charadriiformes Family: Charadriidae

The family Charadriidae includes the plovers, dotterels, and lapwings. They are small to medium-sized birds with compact bodies, short thick necks, and long, usually pointed, wings. They are found in open country worldwide, mostly in habitats near water.

- Black-bellied plover, Pluvialis squatarola
- Pacific golden-plover, Pluvialis squatarola (A)
- Blacksmith lapwing, Vanellus armatus
- White-headed lapwing, Vanellus albiceps
- Crowned lapwing, Vanellus coronatus
- Wattled lapwing, Vanellus senegallus
- Caspian plover, Charadrius asiaticus (A)
- Kittlitz's plover, Charadrius pecuarius
- Common ringed plover, Charadrius hiaticula
- Three-banded plover, Charadrius tricollaris
- White-fronted plover, Charadrius marginatus
- Chestnut-banded plover, Charadrius pallidus

== Painted-snipes ==
Order: Charadriiformes Family: Rostratulidae

Painted-snipe are short-legged, long-billed birds similar in shape to the true snipes, but more brightly coloured.

- Greater painted-snipe, Rostratula benghalensis

== Jacanas ==
Order: Charadriiformes Family: Jacanidae

The jacanas are a group of waders which are found throughout the tropics. They are identifiable by their huge feet and claws which enable them to walk on floating vegetation in the shallow lakes that are their preferred habitat.

- Lesser jacana, Microparra capensis (A)
- African jacana, Actophilornis africanus

== Sandpipers and allies ==
Order: Charadriiformes Family: Scolopacidae

Scolopacidae is a large diverse family of small to medium-sized shorebirds including the sandpipers, curlews, godwits, shanks, tattlers, woodcocks, snipes, dowitchers, and phalaropes. The majority of these species eat small invertebrates picked out of the mud or soil. Variation in length of legs and bills enables multiple species to feed in the same habitat, particularly on the coast, without direct competition for food.

- Whimbrel, Numenius phaeopus
- Eurasian curlew, Numenius arquata (A)
- Bar-tailed godwit, Limosa lapponica
- Black-tailed godwit, Limosa limosa (A)
- Ruddy turnstone, Arenaria interpres
- Ruff, Calidris pugnax
- Curlew sandpiper, Calidris ferruginea
- Sanderling, Calidris alba (A)
- Baird's sandpiper, Calidris bairdii (A)
- Little stint, Calidris minuta
- White-rumped sandpiper, Calidris fuscicollis (A)
- Buff-breasted sandpiper, Calidris subruficollis (A)
- Pectoral sandpiper, Calidris melanotos (A)
- Asian dowitcher, Limnodromus semipalmatus (A)
- African snipe, Gallinago nigripennis
- Terek sandpiper, Xenus cinereus
- Wilson's phalarope, Phalaropus tricolor (A)
- Red phalarope, Phalaropus fulicarius (A)
- Common sandpiper, Actitis hypoleucos
- Green sandpiper, Tringa ochropus (A)
- Spotted redshank, Tringa erythropus (A)
- Common greenshank, Tringa nebularia
- Marsh sandpiper, Tringa stagnatilis
- Wood sandpiper, Tringa glareola
- Common redshank, Tringa totanus (A)

== Buttonquails ==
Order: Charadriiformes Family: Turnicidae

The buttonquails are small, drab, running birds which resemble the true quails. The female is the brighter of the sexes and initiates courtship. The male incubates the eggs and tends the young.

- Small buttonquail, Turnix sylvaticus
- Black-rumped buttonquail, Turnix nanus

== Pratincoles and coursers ==
Order: Charadriiformes Family: Glareolidae

Glareolidae is a family of wading birds comprising the pratincoles, which have short legs, long pointed wings, and long forked tails, and the coursers, which have long legs, short wings, and long, pointed bills which curve downwards.

- Burchell's courser, Cursorius rufus
- Temminck's courser, Cursorius temminckii
- Double-banded courser, Smutsornis africanus
- Three-banded courser, Rhinoptilus cinctus (A)
- Bronze-winged courser, Rhinoptilus chalcopterus
- Collared pratincole, Glareola pratincola
- Black-winged pratincole, Glareola nordmanni

== Gulls, terns, and skimmers ==
Order: Charadriiformes Family: Laridae

Laridae is a family of medium to large seabirds, the gulls, terns, and skimmers. Gulls are typically grey or white, often with black markings on the head or wings. They have stout, longish bills and webbed feet. Terns are a group of generally medium to large seabirds typically with grey or white plumage, often with black markings on the head. Most terns hunt fish by diving but some pick insects off the surface of fresh water. Terns are generally long-lived birds, with several species known to live in excess of 30 years. Skimmers are a small family of tropical tern-like birds. They have an elongated lower mandible which they use to feed by flying low over the water surface and skimming the water for small fish.

- Gray-hooded gull, Chroicocephalus cirrocephalus
- Hartlaub's gull, Chroicocephalus hartlaubii
- Franklin's gull, Leucophaeus pipixcan (A)
- Lesser black-backed gull, Larus fuscus (A)
- Kelp gull, Larus dominicanus
- Sooty tern, Onychoprion fuscatus (A)
- Caspian tern, Hydroprogne caspia
- Black tern, Chlidonias niger (A)
- White-winged tern, Chlidonias leucopterus
- Whiskered tern, Chlidonias hybrida
- African skimmer, Rynchops flavirostris (A)

== Storks ==
Order: Ciconiiformes Family: Ciconiidae

Storks are large, long-legged, long-necked, wading birds with long, stout bills. Storks are mute, but bill-clattering is an important mode of communication at the nest. Their nests can be large and may be reused for many years. Many species are migratory.

- African openbill, Anastomus lamelligerus (A)
- Black stork, Ciconia nigra
- Abdim's stork, Ciconia abdimii
- African woolly-necked stork, Ciconia microscelis
- White stork, Ciconia ciconia
- Saddle-billed stork, Ephippiorhynchus senegalensis
- Marabou stork, Leptoptilos crumenifer
- Yellow-billed stork, Mycteria ibis

== Anhingas ==
Order: Suliformes Family: Anhingidae

Anhingas or darters are often called "snake-birds" because of their long thin neck, which gives a snake-like appearance when they swim with their bodies submerged. The males have black and dark-brown plumage, an erectile crest on the nape and a larger bill than the female. The females have much paler plumage especially on the neck and underparts. The darters have completely webbed feet and their legs are short and set far back on the body. Their plumage is somewhat permeable, like that of cormorants, and they spread their wings to dry after diving.

- African darter, Anhinga rufa

== Cormorants and shags ==
Order: Suliformes Family: Phalacrocoracidae

Phalacrocoracidae is a family of medium to large coastal, fish-eating seabirds that includes cormorants and shags. Plumage colouration varies, with the majority having mainly dark plumage, some species being black-and-white, and a few being colourful.

- Long-tailed cormorant, Microcarbo africanus
- Cape cormorant, Phalacrocorax capensis (A)
- Great cormorant, Phalacrocorax carbo

== Pelicans ==
Order: Pelecaniformes Family: Pelecanidae

Pelicans are large water birds with a distinctive pouch under their beak. They have webbed feet with four toes.

- Great white pelican, Pelecanus onocrotalus (A)
- Pink-backed pelican, Pelecanus rufescens

== Hamerkop ==
Order: Pelecaniformes Family: Scopidae

The hamerkop is a medium-sized bird with a long shaggy crest. The shape of its head with a curved bill and crest at the back is reminiscent of a hammer, hence its name. Its plumage is drab-brown all over.

- Hamerkop, Scopus umbretta

== Herons, egrets, and bitterns ==
Order: Pelecaniformes Family: Ardeidae

The family Ardeidae contains the bitterns, herons, and egrets. Herons and egrets are medium to large wading birds with long necks and legs. Bitterns tend to be shorter necked and more wary. Members of Ardeidae fly with their necks retracted, unlike other long-necked birds such as storks, ibises, and spoonbills.

- Great bittern, Botaurus stellaris (A)
- Little bittern, Ixobrychus minutus
- Dwarf bittern, Ixobrychus sturmii
- Gray heron, Ardea cinerea
- Black-headed heron, Ardea melanocephala
- Goliath heron, Ardea goliath
- Purple heron, Ardea purpurea
- Great egret, Ardea alba
- Intermediate egret, Ardea intermedia
- Little egret, Egretta garzetta
- Western reef-heron, Egretta gularis (A)
- Slaty egret, Egretta vinaceigula (A)
- Black heron, Egretta ardesiaca
- Cattle egret, Bubulcus ibis
- Squacco heron, Ardeola ralloides
- Rufous-bellied heron, Ardeola rufiventris (A)
- Striated heron, Butorides striata
- Black-crowned night-heron, Nycticorax nycticorax
- White-backed night-heron, Gorsachius leuconotus

== Ibises and spoonbills ==
Order: Pelecaniformes Family: Threskiornithidae

Threskiornithidae is a family of large terrestrial and wading birds which includes the ibises and spoonbills. They have long, broad wings with 11 primary and about 20 secondary feathers. They are strong fliers and despite their size and weight, very capable soarers.

- Glossy ibis, Plegadis falcinellus
- African sacred ibis, Threskiornis aethiopicus
- Southern bald ibis, Geronticus calvus (A)
- Hadada ibis, Bostrychia hagedash
- African spoonbill, Platalea alba

== Secretarybird ==
Order: Accipitriformes Family: Sagittariidae

The secretarybird is a bird of prey but is easily distinguished from other raptors by its long crane-like legs.

- Secretarybird, Sagittarius serpentarius

== Osprey ==
Order: Accipitriformes Family: Pandionidae

The family Pandionidae contains only one species, the osprey. The osprey is a medium-large raptor which is a specialist fish-eater with a worldwide distribution.

- Osprey, Pandion haliaetus

== Hawks, eagles, and kites ==
Order: Accipitriformes Family: Accipitridae

Accipitridae is a family of birds of prey which includes hawks, eagles, kites, harriers, and Old World vultures. These birds have powerful hooked beaks for tearing flesh from their prey, strong legs, powerful talons, and keen eyesight.

- Black-winged kite, Elanus caeruleus
- African harrier-hawk, Polyboroides typus
- Bearded vulture, Gypaetus barbatus (Ex)
- European honey-buzzard, Pernis apivorus
- African cuckoo-hawk, Aviceda cuculoides
- White-headed vulture, Trigonoceps occipitalis
- Lappet-faced vulture, Torgos tracheliotos
- Hooded vulture, Necrosyrtes monachus
- White-backed vulture, Gyps africanus
- Cape griffon, Gyps coprotheres
- Bateleur, Terathopius ecaudatus
- Black-chested snake-eagle, Circaetus pectoralis
- Brown snake-eagle, Circaetus cinereus
- Bat hawk, Macheiramphus alcinus
- Crowned eagle, Stephanoaetus coronatus
- Martial eagle, Polemaetus bellicosus
- Long-crested eagle, Lophaetus occipitalis
- Lesser spotted eagle, Clanga pomarina (A)
- Wahlberg's eagle, Hieraaetus wahlbergi
- Booted eagle, Hieraaetus pennatus
- Ayres's hawk-eagle, Hieraaetus ayresii
- Tawny eagle, Aquila rapax
- Steppe eagle, Aquila nipalensis
- Verreaux's eagle, Aquila verreauxii
- African hawk-eagle, Aquila spilogaster
- Lizard buzzard, Kaupifalco monogrammicus
- Dark chanting-goshawk, Melierax metabates
- Pale chanting-goshawk, Melierax canorus
- Gabar goshawk, Micronisus gabar
- Eurasian marsh-harrier, Circus aeruginosus (A)
- African marsh-harrier, Circus ranivorus
- Black harrier, Circus maurus
- Pallid harrier, Circus macrourus
- Montagu's harrier, Circus pygargus
- African goshawk, Accipiter tachiro
- Shikra, Accipiter badius
- Little sparrowhawk, Accipiter minullus
- Ovambo sparrowhawk, Accipiter ovampensis
- Rufous-breasted sparrowhawk, Accipiter rufiventris (A)
- Black goshawk, Accipiter melanoleucus
- Black kite, Milvus migrans
- African fish-eagle, Haliaeetus vocifer
- Common buzzard, Buteo buteo
- Forest buzzard, Buteo trizonatus
- Jackal buzzard, Buteo rufofuscus

== Barn-owls ==
Order: Strigiformes Family: Tytonidae

Barn-owls are medium to large owls with large heads and characteristic heart-shaped faces. They have long strong legs with powerful talons.

- African grass-owl, Tyto capensis
- Western barn owl, Tyto alba

== Owls ==
Order: Strigiformes Family: Strigidae

The typical owls are small to large solitary nocturnal birds of prey. They have large forward-facing eyes and ears, a hawk-like beak, and a conspicuous circle of feathers around each eye called a facial disk.

- African scops-owl, Otus senegalensis
- Southern white-faced owl, Ptilopsis granti
- Cape eagle-owl, Bubo capensis
- Spotted eagle-owl, Bubo africanus
- Verreaux's eagle-owl, Bubo lacteus
- Pearl-spotted owlet, Glaucidium perlatum
- African barred owlet, Glaucidium capense
- African wood-owl, Strix woodfordii
- Marsh owl, Asio capensis

== Mousebirds ==
Order: Coliiformes Family: Coliidae

The mousebirds are slender greyish or brown birds with soft, hairlike body feathers and very long thin tails. They are arboreal and scurry through the leaves like rodents in search of berries, fruit, and buds. They are acrobatic and can feed upside down. All species have strong claws and reversible outer toes. They also have crests and stubby bills.

- Speckled mousebird, Colius striatus
- White-backed mousebird, Colius colius
- Red-faced mousebird, Urocolius indicus

== Trogons ==
Order: Trogoniformes Family: Trogonidae

The family Trogonidae includes trogons and quetzals. Found in tropical woodlands worldwide, they feed on insects and fruit, and their broad bills and weak legs reflect their diet and arboreal habits. Although their flight is fast, they are reluctant to fly any distance. Trogons have soft, often colourful, feathers with distinctive male and female plumage.

- Narina trogon, Apaloderma narina

== Hoopoes ==
Order: Bucerotiformes Family: Upupidae

Hoopoes have black, white, and orangey-pink colouring with a large erectile crest on their head.

- Eurasian hoopoe, Upupa epops

== Woodhoopoes and scimitarbills ==
Order: Bucerotiformes Family: Phoeniculidae

The woodhoopoes and scimitarbills are related to the hoopoes, ground-hornbills, and hornbills. They most resemble the hoopoes with their long curved bills, used to probe for insects, and short rounded wings. However, they differ in that they have metallic plumage, often blue, green, or purple, and lack an erectile crest.

- Green woodhoopoe, Phoeniculus purpureus
- Common scimitarbill, Rhinopomastus cyanomelas

== Hornbills ==
Order: Bucerotiformes Family: Bucerotidae

Hornbills are a group of birds whose bill is shaped like a cow's horn, but without a twist, sometimes with a casque on the upper mandible. Frequently, the bill is brightly coloured.

- Crowned hornbill, Lophoceros alboterminatus
- African gray hornbill, Lophoceros nasutus
- Southern yellow-billed hornbill, Tockus leucomelas
- Southern red-billed hornbill, Tockus rufirostris

== Kingfishers ==
Order: Coraciiformes Family: Alcedinidae

Kingfishers are medium-sized birds with large heads, long pointed bills, short legs, and stubby tails.

- Half-collared kingfisher, Alcedo semitorquata
- Malachite kingfisher, Corythornis cristatus
- African pygmy kingfisher, Ispidina picta
- Gray-headed kingfisher, Halcyon leucocephala
- Woodland kingfisher, Halcyon senegalensis
- Brown-hooded kingfisher, Halcyon albiventris
- Striped kingfisher, Halcyon chelicuti
- Giant kingfisher, Megaceryle maximus
- Pied kingfisher, Ceryle rudis

== Bee-eaters ==
Order: Coraciiformes Family: Meropidae

The bee-eaters are a group of near passerine birds; most species are found in Africa but others occur in southern Europe, Madagascar, Australia, and New Guinea. They are characterised by richly coloured plumage, slender bodies, and usually elongated central tail feathers. All are colourful and have long downturned bills and pointed wings, which give them a swallow-like appearance when seen from afar.

- White-fronted bee-eater, Merops bullockoides
- Little bee-eater, Merops pusillus
- Swallow-tailed bee-eater, Merops hirundineus
- Blue-cheeked bee-eater, Merops persicus
- European bee-eater, Merops apiaster
- Southern carmine bee-eater, Merops nubicoides

== Rollers ==
Order: Coraciiformes Family: Coraciidae

Rollers resemble crows in size and build, but are more closely related to the kingfishers and bee-eaters. They share the colourful appearance of those groups with blues and browns predominating. The two inner front toes are connected, but the outer toe is not.

- European roller, Coracias garrulus
- Lilac-breasted roller, Coracias caudata
- Racket-tailed roller, Coracias spatulata (A)
- Rufous-crowned roller, Coracias naevia
- Broad-billed roller, Eurystomus glaucurus (A)

== African barbets ==
Order: Piciformes Family: Lybiidae

The African barbets are plump birds with short necks and large heads. They get their name from the bristles which fringe their heavy bills. Most species are brightly coloured.

- Crested barbet, Trachyphonus vaillantii
- Yellow-fronted tinkerbird, Pogoniulus chrysoconus
- Pied barbet, Tricholaema leucomelas
- Black-collared barbet, Lybius torquatus

== Honeyguides ==
Order: Piciformes Family: Indicatoridae

Honeyguides are among the few birds that feed on wax. They are named for the greater honeyguide which leads traditional honey-hunters to bees' nests and, after the hunters have harvested the honey, feeds on the remaining contents of the hive.

- Wahlberg's honeyguide, Prodotiscus regulus
- Lesser honeyguide, Indicator minor
- Scaly-throated honeyguide, Indicator variegatus
- Greater honeyguide, Indicator indicator

== Woodpeckers ==
Order: Piciformes Family: Picidae

Woodpeckers are small to medium-sized birds with chisel-like beaks, short legs, stiff tails, and long tongues used for capturing insects. Some species have feet with two toes pointing forward and two backward, while several species have only three toes. Many woodpeckers have the habit of tapping noisily on tree trunks with their beaks.

- Rufous-necked wryneck, Jynx ruficollis
- Cardinal woodpecker, Chloropicus fuscescens
- Bearded woodpecker, Chloropicus namaquus
- Olive woodpecker, Chloropicus griseocephalus
- Ground woodpecker, Geocolaptes olivaceus
- Bennett's woodpecker, Campethera bennettii
- Golden-tailed woodpecker, Campethera abingoni

== Falcons and caracaras ==
Order: Falconiformes Family: Falconidae

Falconidae is a family of diurnal birds of prey. They differ from hawks, eagles, and kites in that they kill with their beaks instead of their talons.

- Pygmy falcon, Polihierax semitorquatus
- Lesser kestrel, Falco naumanni
- Rock kestrel, Falco rupicolus
- Greater kestrel, Falco rupicoloides
- Dickinson's kestrel, Falco dickinsoni
- Red-necked falcon, Falco chicquera (A)
- Red-footed falcon, Falco vespertinus
- Amur falcon, Falco amurensis
- Sooty falcon, Falco concolor
- Eurasian hobby, Falco subbuteo
- African hobby, Falco cuvierii
- Lanner falcon, Falco biarmicus
- Peregrine falcon, Falco peregrinus

== Old World parrots ==
Order: Psittaciformes Family: Psittaculidae.

Characteristic features of parrots include a strong curved bill, an upright stance, strong legs, and clawed zygodactyl feet. Many parrots are vividly colored, and some are multi-colored. In size they range from 8 cm (3.1 in) to 1 m (3.3 ft) in length. Old World parrots are found from Africa east across south and southeast Asia and Oceania to Australia and New Zealand.

- Rose-ringed parakeet, Psittacula krameri (I)
- Rosy-faced lovebird, Agapornis roseicollis

== African and New World parrots ==
Order: Psittaciformes Family: Psittacidae.

Characteristic features of parrots include a strong curved bill, an upright stance, strong legs, and clawed zygodactyl feet. Many parrots are vividly coloured, and some are multi-coloured. In size they range from 8 cm (3.1 in) to 1 m (3.3 ft) in length. Most of the more than 150 species in this family are found in the New World.

- Brown-necked parrot, Poicephalus fuscicollis
- Cape parrot, Poicephalus robustus
- Meyer's parrot, Poicephalus meyeri
- Brown-headed parrot, Poicephalus cryptoxanthus

== African and green broadbills ==
Order: Passeriformes Family: Calyptomenidae

The broadbills are small, brightly coloured birds which feed on fruit and also take insects in flycatcher fashion, snapping their broad bills. Their habitat is canopies of wet forests.

- African broadbill, Smithornis capensis

== Pittas ==
Order: Passeriformes Family: Pittidae

Pittas are medium-sized by passerine standards and are stocky, with fairly long, strong legs, short tails, and stout bills. Many are brightly coloured. They spend the majority of their time on wet forest floors, eating snails, insects, and similar invertebrates.

- African pitta, Pitta angolensis

== Cuckooshrikes ==
Order: Passeriformes Family: Campephagidae

The cuckooshrikes are small to medium-sized passerine birds. They are predominantly greyish with white and black, although some species are brightly coloured.

- White-breasted cuckooshrike, Coracina pectoralis
- Black cuckooshrike, Campephaga flava

== Old World orioles ==
Order: Passeriformes Family: Oriolidae

The Old World orioles are colourful passerine birds which are not related to the similar-appearing New World orioles.

- Eurasian golden oriole, Oriolus oriolus
- African black-headed oriole, Oriolus larvatus

== Wattle-eyes and batises ==
Order: Passeriformes Family: Platysteiridae

The wattle-eyes, or puffback flycatchers, are small stout passerine birds of the African tropics. They get their name from the brightly coloured fleshy eye decorations found in most species in this group.

- Black-throated wattle-eye, Platysteira peltata
- Cape batis, Batis capensis (A)
- Chinspot batis, Batis molitor
- Pririt batis, Batis pririt

== Vangas, helmetshrikes, and allies ==
Order: Passeriformes Family: Vangidae

The helmetshrikes are similar in build to the shrikes, but tend to be colourful species with distinctive crests or other head ornaments, such as wattles, from which they get their name.

- White helmetshrike, Prionops plumatus
- Retz's helmetshrike, Prionops retzii

== Bushshrikes and allies ==
Order: Passeriformes Family: Malaconotidae

Bushshrikes are similar in habits to shrikes, hunting insects and other small prey from a perch on a bush. Although similar in build to the shrikes, these tend to be either colourful species or largely black; some species are quite secretive.

- Brubru, Nilaus afer
- Black-backed puffback, Dryoscopus cubla
- Black-crowned tchagra, Tchagra senegala
- Brown-crowned tchagra, Tchagra australis
- Southern tchagra, Tchagra tchagra
- Tropical boubou, Laniarius major
- Southern boubou, Laniarius ferrugineus
- Crimson-breasted gonolek, Laniarius atrococcineus
- Bokmakierie, Telophorus zeylonus
- Sulphur-breasted bushshrike, Telophorus sulfureopectus
- Olive bushshrike, Telophorus olivaceus
- Black-fronted bushshrike, Telophorus nigrifrons
- Four-colored bushshrike, Telophorus viridis (A)
- Gray-headed bushshrike, Malaconotus blanchoti

== Drongos ==
Order: Passeriformes Family: Dicruridae

The drongos are mostly black or dark grey in colour, sometimes with metallic tints. They have long forked tails, and some Asian species have elaborate tail decorations. They have short legs and sit very upright when perched, like a shrike. They flycatch or take prey from the ground.

- Common square-tailed drongo, Dicrurus ludwigii
- Fork-tailed drongo, Dicrurus adsimilis

== Monarch flycatchers ==
Order: Passeriformes Family: Monarchidae

The monarch flycatchers are small to medium-sized insectivorous passerines which hunt by flycatching.

- African crested-flycatcher, Trochocercus cyanomelas
- African paradise-flycatcher, Terpsiphone viridis

== Shrikes ==
Order: Passeriformes Family: Laniidae

Shrikes are passerine birds known for their habit of catching other birds and small animals and impaling the uneaten portions of their bodies on thorns. A shrike's beak is hooked, like that of a typical bird of prey.

- Red-backed shrike, Lanius collurio
- Lesser gray shrike, Lanius minor
- Magpie shrike, Lanius melanoleucus
- Northern fiscal, Lanius humeralis
- Southern fiscal, Lanius collaris
- White-crowned shrike, Eurocephalus anguitimens

== Crows, jays, and magpies ==
Order: Passeriformes Family: Corvidae

The family Corvidae includes crows, ravens, jays, choughs, magpies, treepies, nutcrackers, and ground jays. Corvids are above average in size among the Passeriformes, and some of the larger species show high levels of intelligence.

- Cape crow, Corvus capensis
- Pied crow, Corvus albus

== Fairy flycatchers ==
Order: Passeriformes Family: Stenostiridae

Most of the species of this small family are found in Africa, though a few inhabit tropical Asia. They are not closely related to other birds called "flycatchers".

- Fairy flycatcher, Stenostira scita

== Tits, chickadees, and titmice ==
Order: Passeriformes Family: Paridae

The Paridae are mainly small stocky woodland species with short stout bills. Some have crests. They are adaptable birds, with a mixed diet including seeds and insects.

- Southern black-tit, Melaniparus niger
- Ashy tit, Melaniparus cinerascens

== Penduline-tits ==
Order: Passeriformes Family: Remizidae

The penduline-tits are a group of small passerine birds related to the true tits. They are insectivores.

- African penduline-tit, Anthoscopus caroli
- Southern penduline-tit, Anthoscopus minutus

== Larks ==
Order: Passeriformes Family: Alaudidae

Larks are small terrestrial birds with often extravagant songs and display flights. Most larks are fairly dull in appearance. Their food is insects and seeds.

- Spike-heeled lark, Chersomanes albofasciata
- Short-clawed lark, Certhilauda chuana
- Eastern long-billed lark, Certhilauda semitorquata
- Dusky lark, Pinarocorys nigricans
- Chestnut-backed sparrow-lark, Eremopterix leucotis
- Gray-backed sparrow-lark, Eremopterix verticalis
- Sabota lark, Calendulauda sabota
- Fawn-colored lark, Calendulauda africanoides
- Rudd's lark, Heteromirafra ruddi
- Cape clapper lark, Mirafra apiata
- Eastern clapper lark, Mirafra fasciolata
- Rufous-naped lark, Mirafra africana
- Flappet lark, Mirafra rufocinnamomea
- Monotonous lark, Mirafra passerina
- Red-capped lark, Calandrella cinerea
- Pink-billed lark, Spizocorys conirostris
- Botha's lark, Spizocorys fringillaris
- Large-billed lark, Galerida magnirostris

== Nicators ==
Order: Passeriformes Family: Nicatoridae

The nicators are shrike-like, with hooked bills. They are endemic to sub-Saharan Africa.

- Eastern nicator, Nicator gularis

== African warblers ==
Order: Passeriformes Family: Macrosphenidae

African warblers are small to medium-sized insectivores which are found in a wide variety of habitats south of the Sahara.

- Cape crombec, Sylvietta rufescens
- Cape grassbird, Sphenoeacus afer

== Cisticolas and allies ==
Order: Passeriformes Family: Cisticolidae

The Cisticolidae are warblers found mainly in warmer southern regions of the Old World. They are generally very small birds of drab brown or grey appearance found in open country such as grassland or scrub.

- Yellow-bellied eremomela, Eremomela icteropygialis
- Greencap eremomela, Eremomela scotops
- Burnt-necked eremomela, Eremomela usticollis
- Barred wren-warbler, Calamonastes fasciolatus
- Green-backed camaroptera, Camaroptera brachyura
- Bar-throated apalis, Apalis thoracica
- Tawny-flanked prinia, Prinia subflava
- Black-chested prinia, Prinia flavicans
- Drakensberg prinia, Prinia hypoxantha
- Rufous-eared warbler, Malcorus pectoralis
- Red-faced cisticola, Cisticola erythrops
- Rock-loving cisticola, Cisticola aberrans
- Rattling cisticola, Cisticola chiniana
- Tinkling cisticola, Cisticola rufilatus (A)
- Wailing cisticola, Cisticola lais
- Rufous-winged cisticola, Cisticola galactotes
- Levaillant's cisticola, Cisticola tinniens
- Croaking cisticola, Cisticola natalensis
- Piping cisticola, Cisticola fulvicapillus
- Zitting cisticola, Cisticola juncidis
- Desert cisticola, Cisticola aridulus
- Cloud cisticola, Cisticola textrix
- Pale-crowned cisticola, Cisticola cinnamomeus
- Wing-snapping cisticola, Cisticola ayresii

== Reed warblers and allies ==
Order: Passeriformes Family: Acrocephalidae

The members of this family are usually rather large for "warblers". Most are rather plain olivaceous brown above with much yellow to beige below. They are usually found in open woodland, reedbeds, or tall grass. The family occurs mostly in southern to western Eurasia and surroundings, but it also ranges far into the Pacific, with some species in Africa.

- African yellow-warbler, Iduna natalensis (A)
- Olive-tree warbler, Hippolais olivetorum
- Icterine warbler, Hippolais icterina
- Sedge warbler, Acrocephalus schoenobaenus
- Marsh warbler, Acrocephalus palustris
- Common reed warbler, Acrocephalus scirpaceus
- Basra reed warbler, Acrocephalus griseldis (A)
- Lesser swamp warbler, Acrocephalus gracilirostris
- Great reed warbler, Acrocephalus arundinaceus

== Grassbirds and allies ==
Order: Passeriformes Family: Locustellidae

Locustellidae are a family of small insectivorous songbirds found mainly in Eurasia, Africa, and the Australian region. They are smallish birds with tails that are usually long and pointed, and tend to be drab brownish or buffy all over.

- River warbler, Locustella fluviatilis (A)
- Barratt's warbler, Bradypterus barratti
- Little rush warbler, Bradypterus baboecala

== Swallows ==
Order: Passeriformes Family: Hirundinidae

The family Hirundinidae is adapted to aerial feeding. They have a slender streamlined body, long pointed wings, and a short bill with a wide gape. The feet are adapted to perching rather than walking, and the front toes are partially joined at the base.

- Plain martin, Riparia paludicola
- Bank swallow, Riparia riparia
- Banded martin, Neophedina cincta
- Rock martin, Ptyonoprogne fuligula
- Barn swallow, Hirundo rustica
- White-throated swallow, Hirundo albigularis
- Wire-tailed swallow, Hirundo smithii (A)
- Pearl-breasted swallow, Hirundo dimidiata
- Montane blue swallow, Hirundo atrocaerulea
- Greater striped swallow, Cecropis cucullata
- Lesser striped swallow, Cecropis abyssinica
- Rufous-chested swallow, Cecropis semirufa
- South African swallow, Petrochelidon spilodera
- Common house-martin, Delichon urbicum
- Gray-rumped swallow, Pseudhirundo griseopyga

== Bulbuls ==
Order: Passeriformes Family: Pycnonotidae

Bulbuls are medium-sized songbirds. Some are colourful with yellow, red, or orange vents, cheeks, throats or supercilia, but most are drab, with uniform olive-brown to black plumage. Some species have distinct crests.

- Sombre greenbul, Andropadus importunus
- Yellow-bellied greenbul, Chlorocichla flaviventris
- Terrestrial brownbul, Phyllastrephus terrestris
- Common bulbul, Pycnonotus barbatus
- Black-fronted bulbul, Pycnonotus nigricans

== Leaf warblers ==
Order: Passeriformes Family: Phylloscopidae

Leaf warblers are a family of small insectivorous birds found mostly in Eurasia and ranging into Wallacea and Africa. The species are of various sizes, often green-plumaged above and yellow below, or more subdued with greyish-green to greyish-brown colours.

- Willow warbler, Phylloscopus trochilus
- Yellow-throated woodland-warbler, Phylloscopus ruficapilla

== Sylviid warblers, parrotbills, and allies ==
Order: Passeriformes Family: Sylviidae

The family Sylviidae ("Old World warblers") is a group of small insectivorous passerine birds. They mainly occur as breeding species, as the common name implies, in Europe, Asia and, to a lesser extent, Africa. Most are of generally undistinguished appearance, but many have distinctive songs.

- Eurasian blackcap, Sylvia atricapilla (V)
- Garden warbler, Sylvia borin
- Bush blackcap, Sylvia nigricapillus
- Barred warbler, Curruca nisoria
- Chestnut-vented warbler, Curruca subcoerulea
- Greater whitethroat, Curruca communis

== White-eyes, yuhinas, and allies ==
Order: Passeriformes Family: Zosteropidae

The white-eyes are small and mostly undistinguished, their plumage above being generally some dull colour like greenish-olive, but some species have a white or bright yellow throat, breast or lower parts, and several have buff flanks. As their name suggests, many species have a white ring around each eye.

- Orange River white-eye, Zosterops pallidus
- Cape white-eye, Zosterops virens
- Southern yellow white-eye, Zosterops anderssoni

== Laughingthrushes and allies ==
Order: Passeriformes Family: Leiothrichidae

The members of this family are diverse in size and colouration, though those of genus Turdoides tend to be brown or greyish. The family is found in Africa, India, and southeast Asia.

- Arrow-marked babbler, Turdoides jardineii
- Southern pied-babbler, Turdoides bicolor

== Oxpeckers ==
Order: Passeriformes Family: Buphagidae

As both the English and scientific names of these birds imply, they feed on ectoparasites, primarily ticks, found on large mammals.

- Red-billed oxpecker, Buphagus erythrorynchus

== Starlings ==
Order: Passeriformes Family: Sturnidae

Starlings are small to medium-sized passerine birds. Their flight is strong and direct and they are very gregarious. Their preferred habitat is fairly open country. They eat insects and fruit. Plumage is typically dark with a metallic sheen.

- European starling, Sturnus vulgaris (A)
- Wattled starling, Creatophora cinerea
- Common myna, Acridotheres tristis (I)
- Violet-backed starling, Cinnyricinclus leucogaster
- Pale-winged starling, Onychognathus nabouroup (A)
- Red-winged starling, Onychognathus morio
- Black-bellied starling, Notopholia corusca
- Burchell's starling, Lamprotornis australis
- Meves's starling, Lamprotornis mevesii
- African pied starling, Lamprotornis bicolor
- Greater blue-eared starling, Lamprotornis chalybaeus
- Cape starling, Lamprotornis nitens

== Thrushes and allies ==
Order: Passeriformes Family: Turdidae

The thrushes are a group of passerine birds that occur mainly in the Old World. They are plump, soft plumaged, small to medium-sized insectivores or sometimes omnivores, often feeding on the ground. Many have attractive songs.

- Orange ground-thrush, Geokichla gurneyi
- Groundscraper thrush, Turdus litsitsirupa
- Kurrichane thrush, Turdus libonyana
- Olive thrush, Turdus olivaceus
- Karoo thrush, Turdus smithi

== Old World flycatchers ==
Order: Passeriformes Family: Muscicapidae

Old World flycatchers are a large group of small passerine birds native to the Old World. They are mainly small arboreal insectivores. The appearance of these birds is highly varied, but they mostly have weak songs and harsh calls.

- African dusky flycatcher, Muscicapa adusta
- Spotted flycatcher, Muscicapa striata
- Mariqua flycatcher, Bradornis mariquensis
- Pale flycatcher, Agricola pallidus
- Chat flycatcher, Agricola infuscatus
- Gray tit-flycatcher, Fraseria plumbeus
- Ashy flycatcher, Fraseria caerulescens
- Fiscal flycatcher, Sigelus silens
- Southern black-flycatcher, Melaenornis pammelaina
- Brown scrub-robin, Cercotrichas signata
- Kalahari scrub-robin, Cercotrichas paena
- Red-backed scrub-robin, Cercotrichas leucophrys
- Cape robin-chat, Cossypha caffra
- White-throated robin-chat, Cossypha humeralis
- White-browed robin-chat, Cossypha heuglini
- Red-capped robin-chat, Cossypha natalensis
- Chorister robin-chat, Cossypha dichroa
- White-starred robin, Pogonocichla stellata
- Thrush nightingale, Luscinia luscinia (A)
- Collared flycatcher, Ficedula albicollis (A)
- Short-toed rock-thrush, Monticola brevipes
- Sentinel rock-thrush, Monticola explorator
- Cape rock-thrush, Monticola rupestris
- African stonechat, Saxicola torquatus
- Buff-streaked chat, Campicoloides bifasciatus
- Sickle-winged chat, Emarginata sinuata
- Mocking cliff-chat, Thamnolaea cinnamomeiventris
- Southern anteater-chat, Myrmecocichla formicivora
- Mountain wheatear, Myrmecocichla monticola
- Arnot's chat, Myrmecocichla arnotti
- Capped wheatear, Oenanthe pileata
- Familiar chat, Oenanthe familiaris

== Sugarbirds ==
Order: Passeriformes Family: Promeropidae

The two species in this family are restricted to southern Africa. They have brownish plumage, a long downcurved bill, and long tail feathers.

- Gurney's sugarbird, Promerops gurneyi

== Sunbirds and spiderhunters ==
Order: Passeriformes Family: Nectariniidae

The sunbirds and spiderhunters are very small passerine birds which feed largely on nectar, although they will also take insects, especially when feeding young. Flight is fast and direct on their short wings. Most species can take nectar by hovering like a hummingbird, but usually perch to feed.

- Collared sunbird, Hedydipna collaris (A)
- Amethyst sunbird, Chalcomitra amethystina
- Scarlet-chested sunbird, Chalcomitra senegalensis
- Malachite sunbird, Nectarinia famosa
- Southern double-collared sunbird, Cinnyris chalybeus
- Greater double-collared sunbird, Cinnyris afer
- Mariqua sunbird, Cinnyris mariquensis
- Purple-banded sunbird, Cinnyris bifasciatus
- White-breasted sunbird, Cinnyris talatala

== Weavers and allies ==
Order: Passeriformes Family: Ploceidae

The weavers are small passerine birds related to the finches. They are seed-eating birds with rounded conical bills. The males of many species are brightly coloured, usually in red or yellow and black, though some species show variation in colour only in the breeding season.

- Red-billed buffalo-weaver, Bubalornis niger
- Scaly weaver, Sporopipes squamifrons
- White-browed sparrow-weaver, Plocepasser mahali
- Sociable weaver, Philetairus socius
- Red-headed weaver, Anaplectes rubriceps
- Spectacled weaver, Ploceus ocularis
- Cape weaver, Ploceus capensis
- African golden-weaver, Ploceus subaureus
- Lesser masked-weaver, Ploceus intermedius
- Southern masked-weaver, Ploceus velatus
- Village weaver, Ploceus cucullatus
- Red-headed quelea, Quelea erythrops
- Red-billed quelea, Quelea quelea
- Southern red bishop, Euplectes orix
- Yellow-crowned bishop, Euplectes afer
- Yellow bishop, Euplectes capensis
- White-winged widowbird, Euplectes albonotatus
- Red-collared widowbird, Euplectes ardens
- Fan-tailed widowbird, Euplectes axillaris (A)
- Long-tailed widowbird, Euplectes progne
- Grosbeak weaver, Amblyospiza albifrons

== Waxbills and allies ==
Order: Passeriformes Family: Estrildidae

The estrildid finches are small passerine birds of the Old World tropics and Australasia. They are gregarious and often colonial seed eaters with short thick but pointed bills. They are all similar in structure and habits, but have wide variation in plumage colours and patterns.

- Bronze mannikin, Spermestes cucullata
- Swee waxbill, Coccopygia melanotis
- Black-faced waxbill, Brunhilda erythronotos
- Common waxbill, Estrilda astrild
- Quailfinch, Ortygospiza fuscocrissa
- Cut-throat, Amadina fasciata
- Red-headed finch, Amadina erythrocephala
- Zebra waxbill, Amandava subflava
- Violet-eared waxbill, Uraeginthus granatina
- Southern cordonbleu, Uraeginthus angolensis
- Green-winged pytilia, Pytilia melba
- Orange-winged pytilia, Pytilia afra
- Pink-throated twinspot, Hypargos margaritatus
- Red-billed firefinch, Lagonosticta senegala
- African firefinch, Lagonosticta rubricata
- Jameson's firefinch, Lagonosticta rhodopareia

== Indigobirds ==
Order: Passeriformes Family: Viduidae

The indigobirds are finch-like species which usually have black or indigo predominating in their plumage. All are brood parasites, which lay their eggs in the nests of estrildid finches.

- Pin-tailed whydah, Vidua macroura
- Eastern paradise-whydah, Vidua paradisaea
- Shaft-tailed whydah, Vidua regia
- Village indigobird, Vidua chalybeata
- Variable indigobird, Vidua funerea
- Purple indigobird, Vidua purpurascens
- Parasitic weaver, Anomalospiza imberbis

== Old World sparrows ==
Order: Passeriformes Family: Passeridae

Sparrows are small passerine birds. In general, sparrows tend to be small, plump, brown or grey birds with short tails and short powerful beaks. Sparrows are seed eaters, but they also consume small insects.

- House sparrow, Passer domesticus (I)
- Great rufous sparrow, Passer motitensis
- Cape sparrow, Passer melanurus
- Southern gray-headed sparrow, Passer diffusus
- Yellow-throated bush sparrow, Gymnoris superciliaris

== Wagtails and pipits ==
Order: Passeriformes Family: Motacillidae

Motacillidae is a family of small passerine birds with medium to long tails. They include the wagtails, longclaws, and pipits. They are slender ground-feeding insectivores of open country.

- Cape wagtail, Motacilla capensis
- Mountain wagtail, Motacilla clara
- Gray wagtail, Motacilla cinerea (A)
- Western yellow wagtail, Motacilla flava
- African pied wagtail, Motacilla aguimp
- African pipit, Anthus cinnamomeus
- Mountain pipit, Anthus hoeschi
- Nicholson's pipit, Anthus nicholsoni
- Plain-backed pipit, Anthus leucophrys
- Buffy pipit, Anthus vaalensis
- Striped pipit, Anthus lineiventris
- Yellow-tufted pipit, Anthus crenatus
- Tree pipit, Anthus trivialis (A)
- Short-tailed pipit, Anthus brachyurus
- Bush pipit, Anthus caffer
- Golden pipit, Tmetothylacus tenellus (A)
- Yellow-breasted pipit, Hemimacronyx chloris
- Orange-throated longclaw, Macronyx capensis (B)
- Yellow-throated longclaw, Macronyx croceus

== Finches, euphonias, and allies ==
Order: Passeriformes Family: Fringillidae

Finches are seed-eating passerine birds that are small to moderately large and have a strong beak, usually conical and in some species very large. All have twelve tail feathers and nine primaries. These birds have a bouncing flight with alternating bouts of flapping and gliding on closed wings, and most sing well.

- Yellow-fronted canary, Crithagra mozambica
- Forest canary, Crithagra scotops
- Black-throated canary, Crithagra atrogularis
- Brimstone canary, Crithagra sulphurata
- Yellow canary, Crithagra flaviventris
- White-throated seedeater, Crithagra albogularis
- Streaky-headed seedeater, Crithagra gularis
- Cape canary, Serinus canicollis
- Black-headed canary, Serinus alario (A)

== Old World buntings ==
Order: Passeriformes Family: Emberizidae

The emberizids are a large family of passerine birds. They are seed-eating birds with distinctively shaped bills. Many emberizid species have distinctive head patterns.

- Golden-breasted bunting, Emberiza flaviventris
- Cape bunting, Emberiza capensis (A)
- Lark-like bunting, Emberiza impetuani
- Cinnamon-breasted bunting, Emberiza tahapisi

== Gallery ==
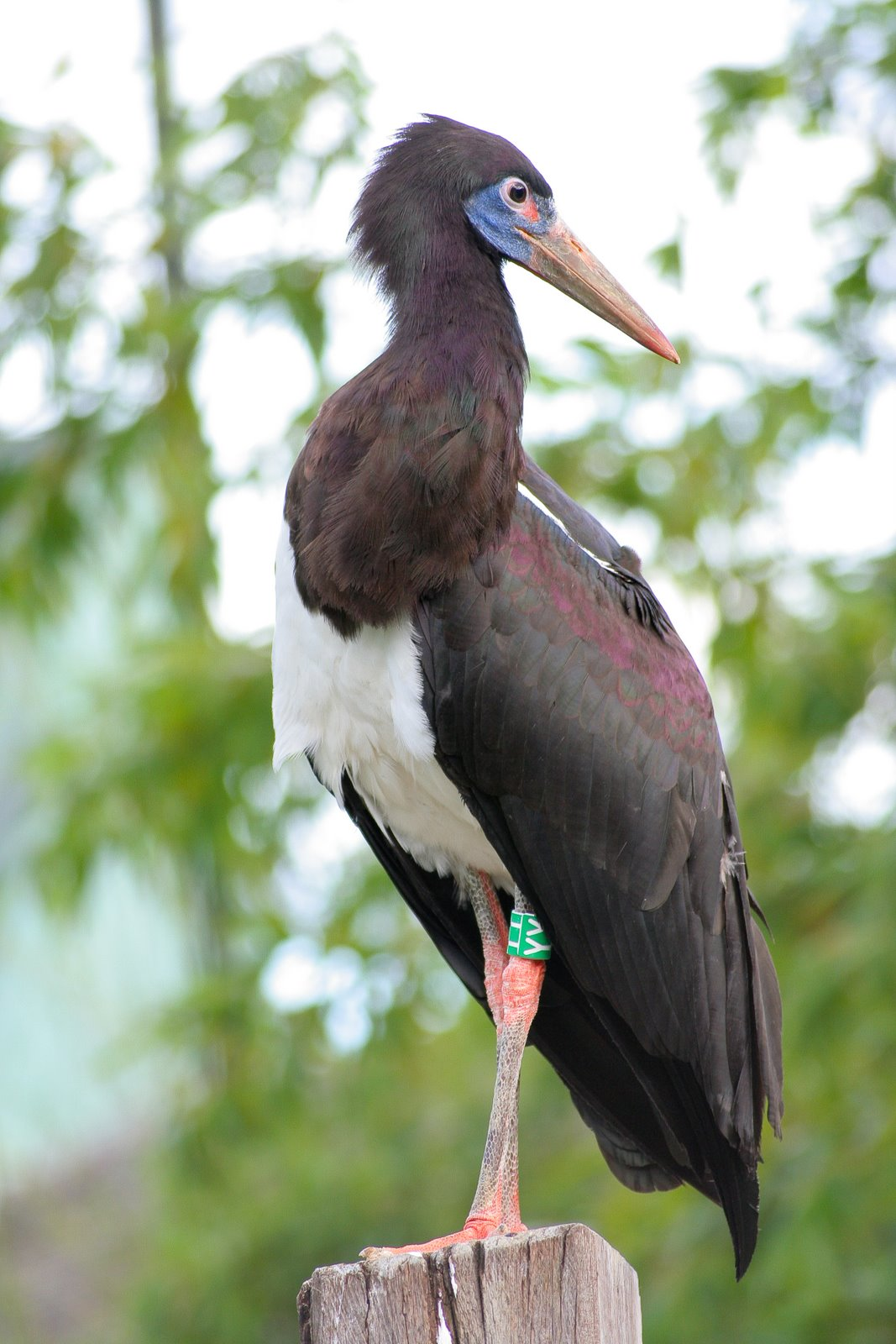
Abdim's stork

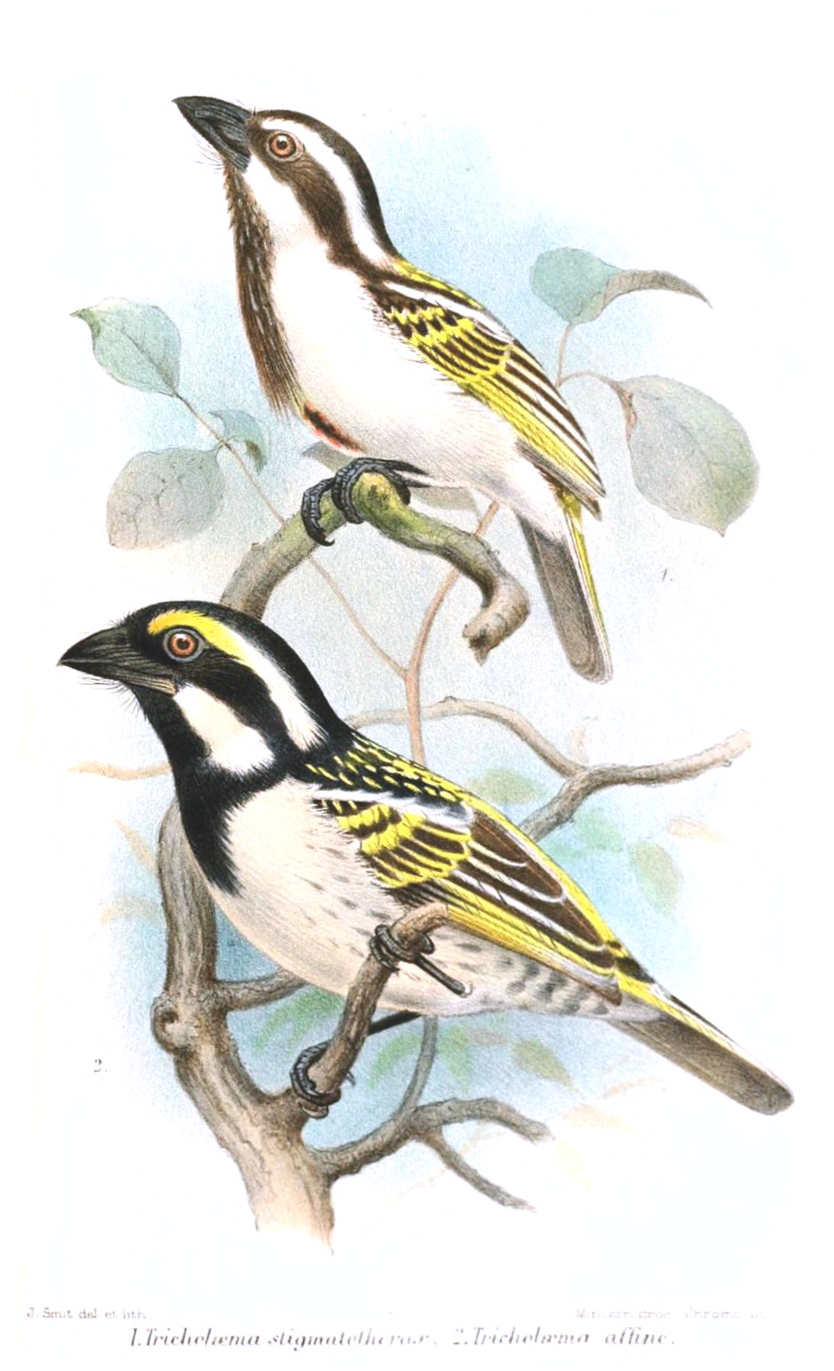
Acacia pied barbet

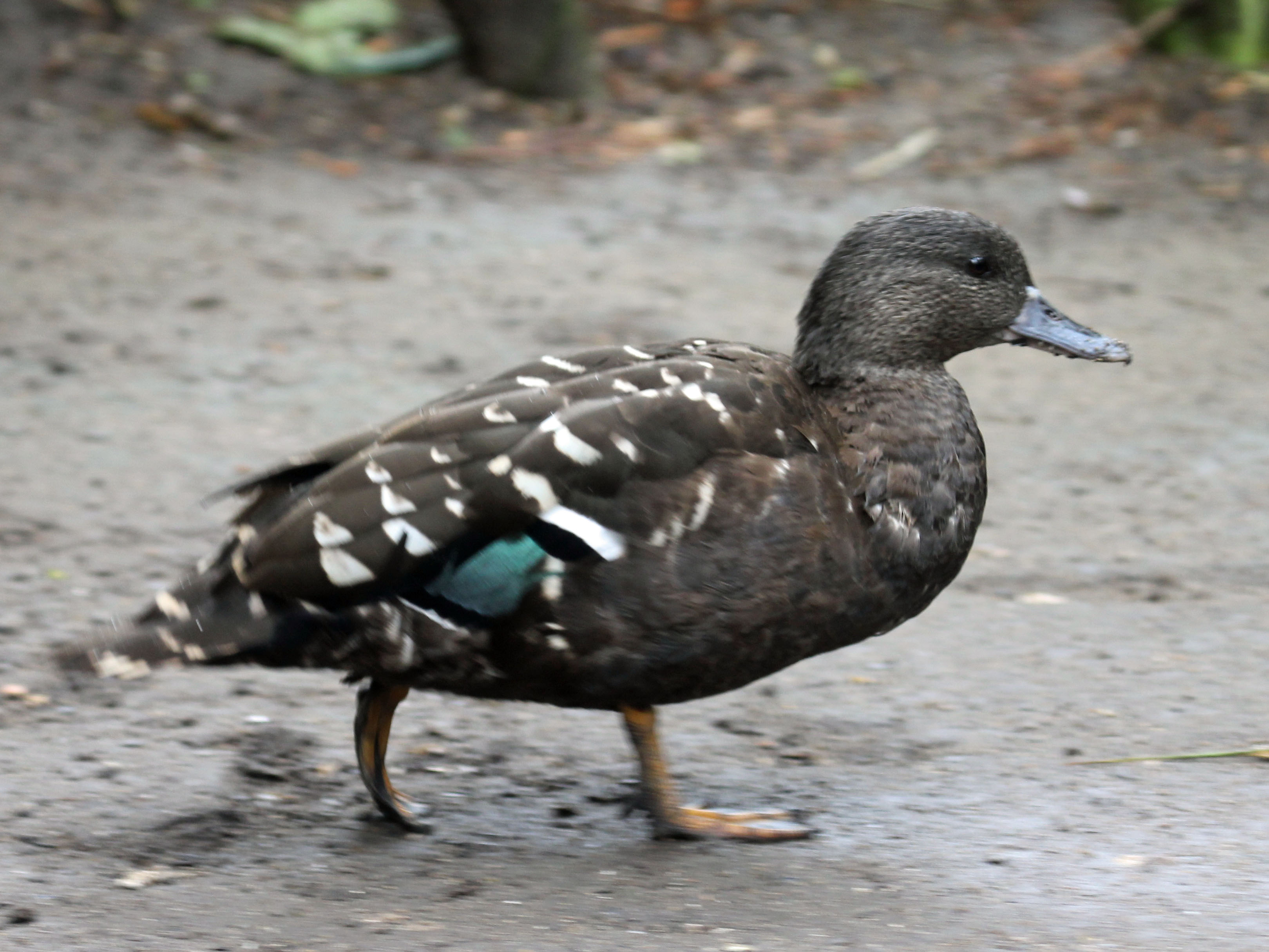
African black duck

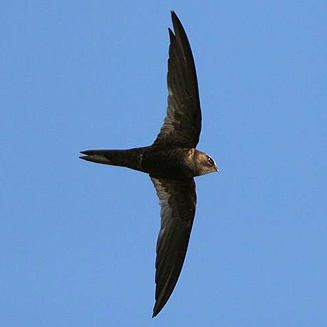
African black swift

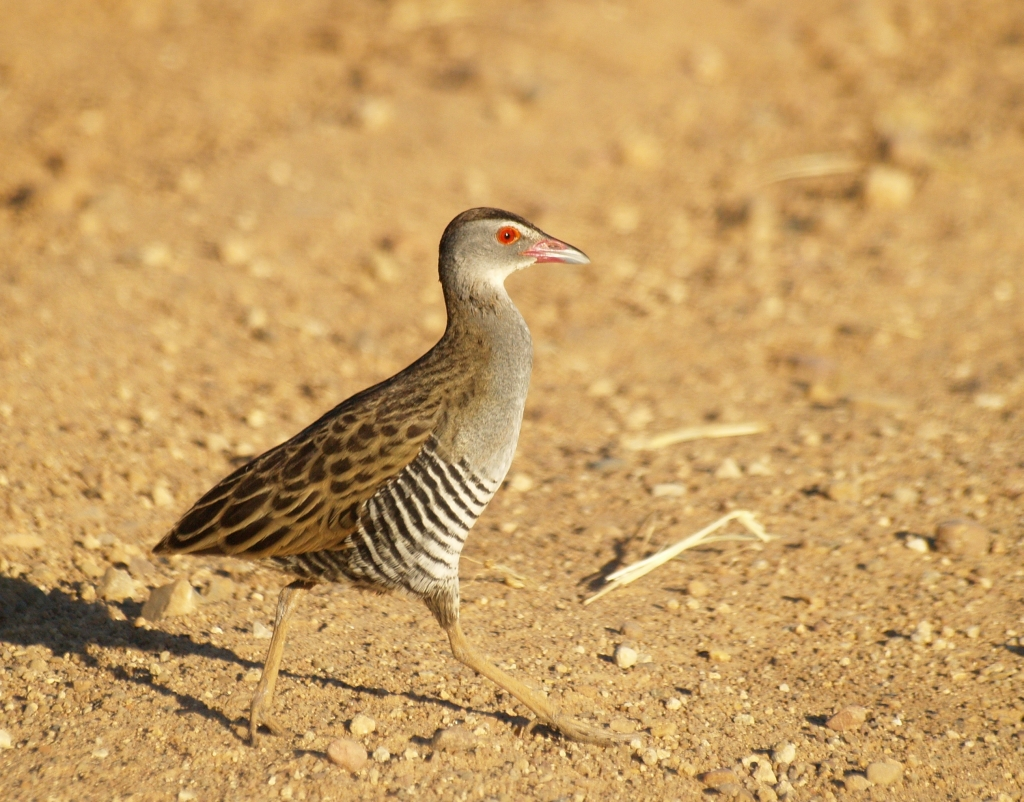
African crake

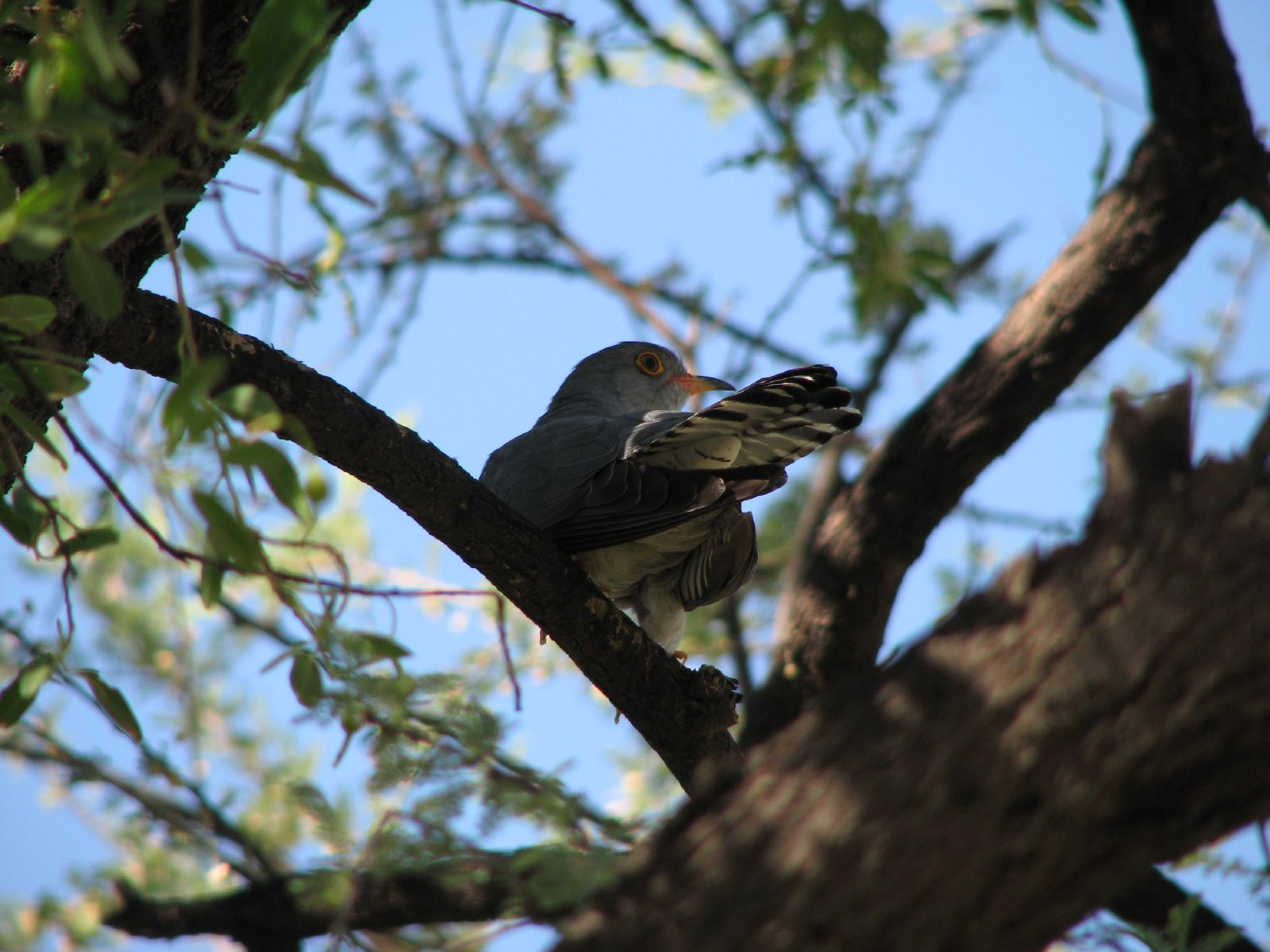
African cuckoo

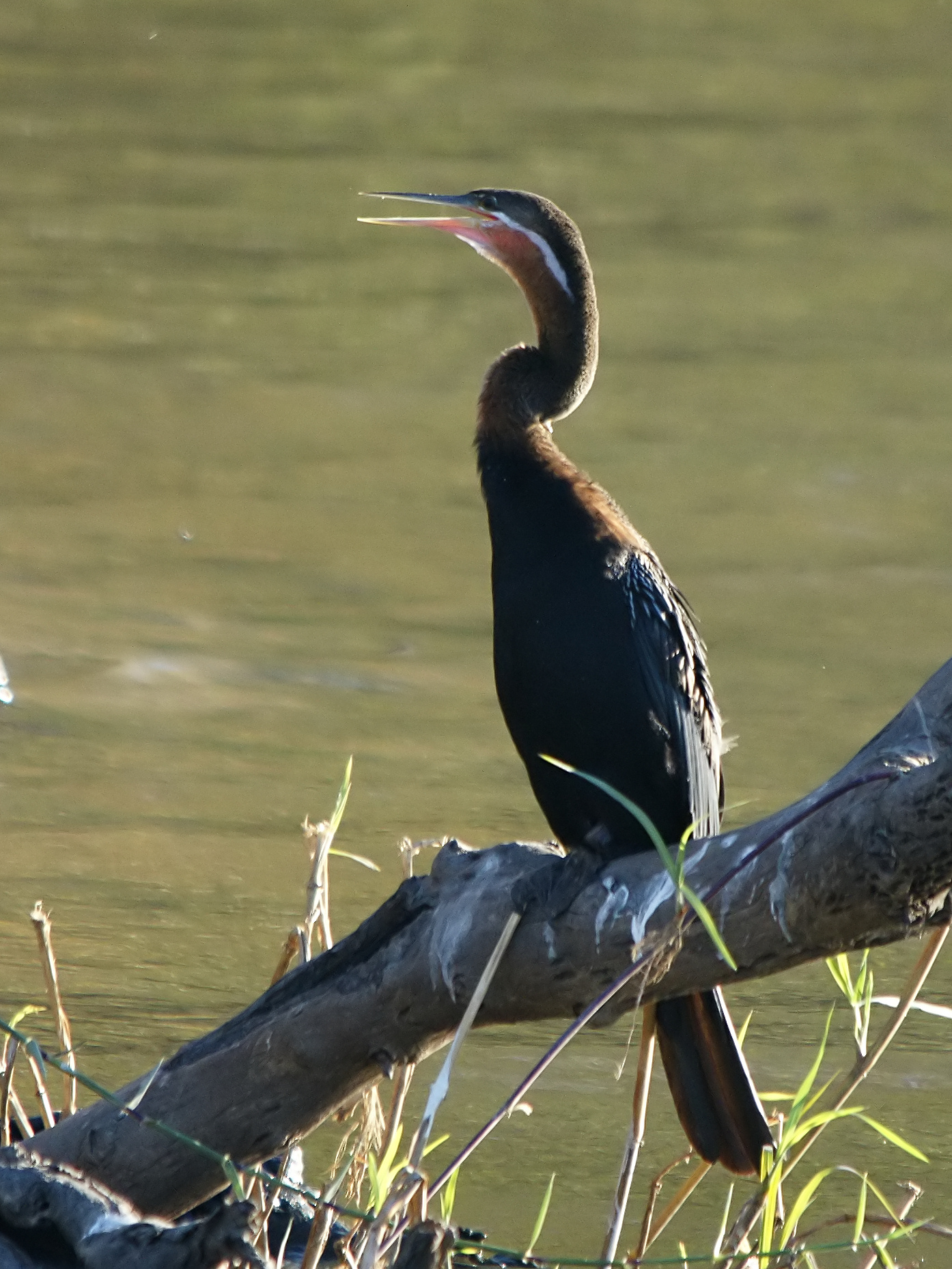
African darter

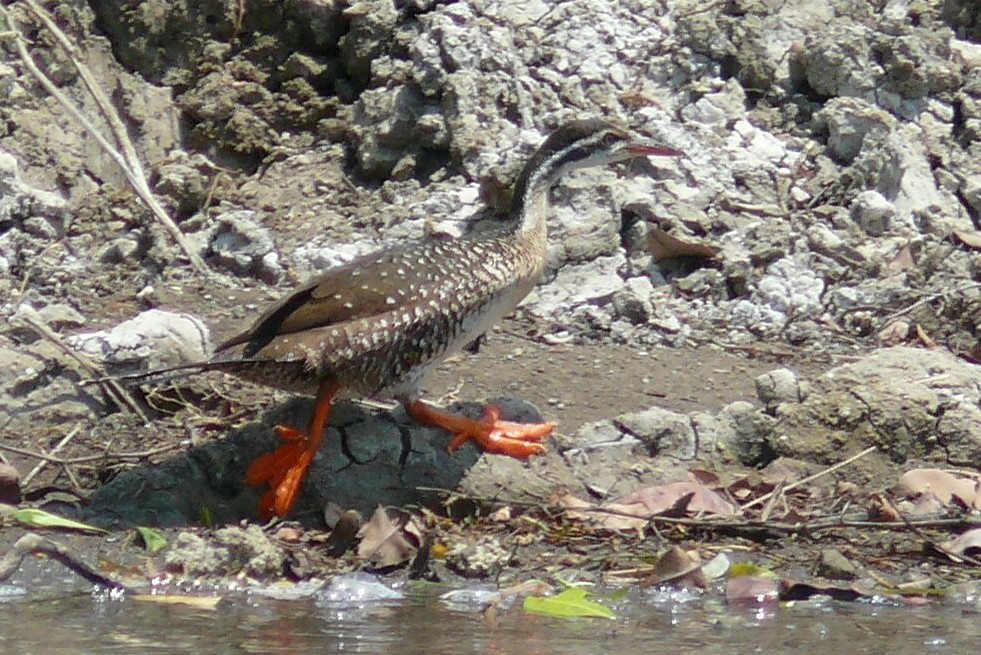
African finfoot

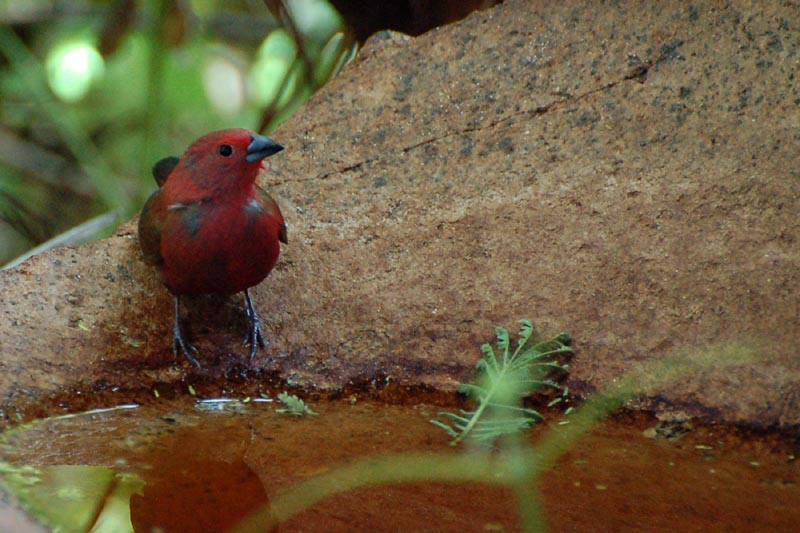
African firefinch

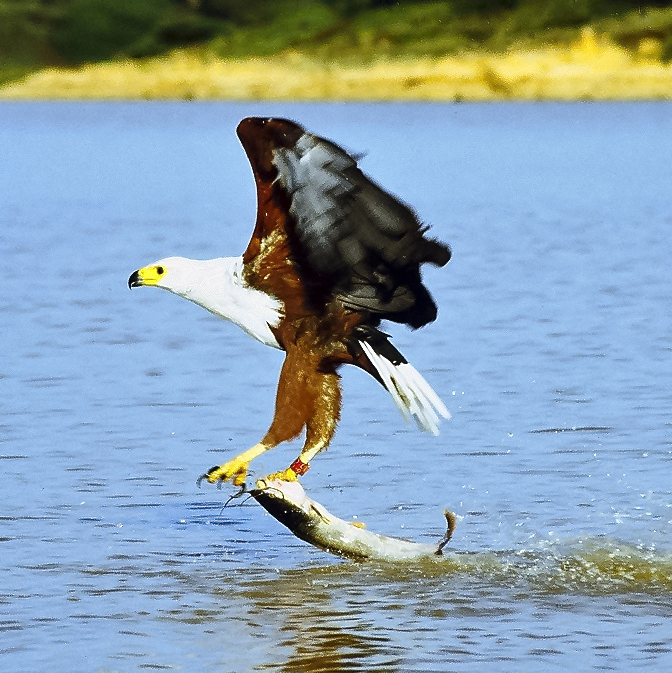
African fish eagle

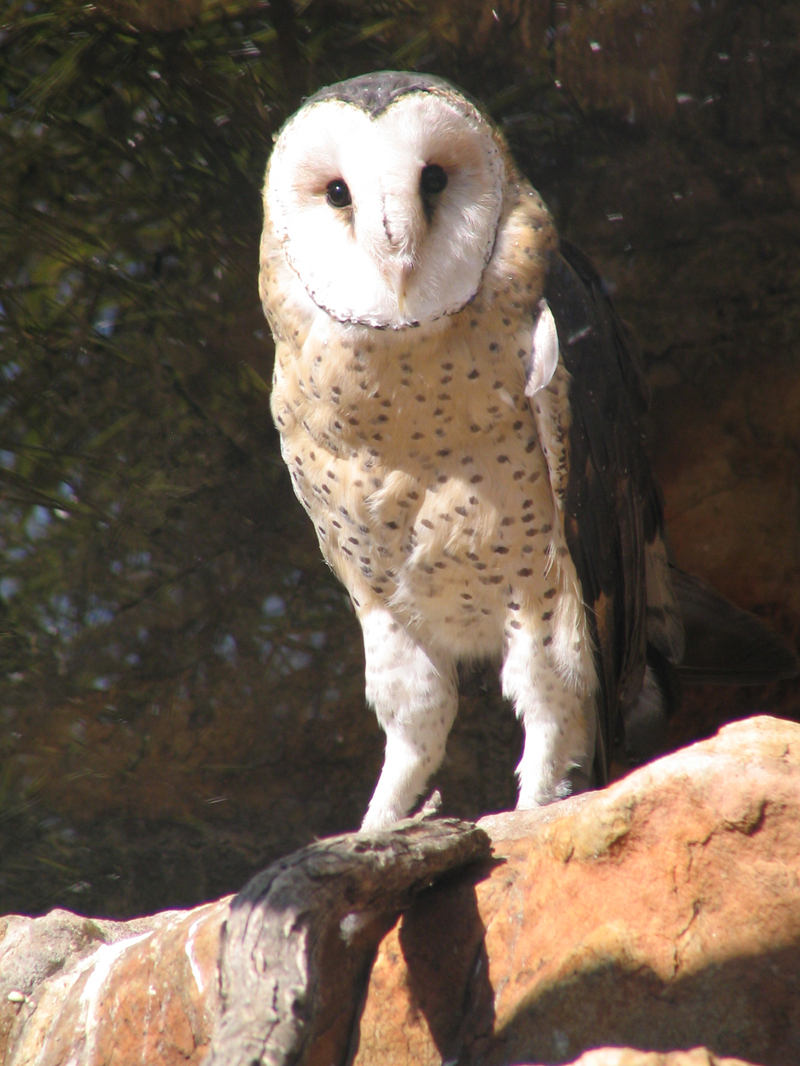
African grass owl

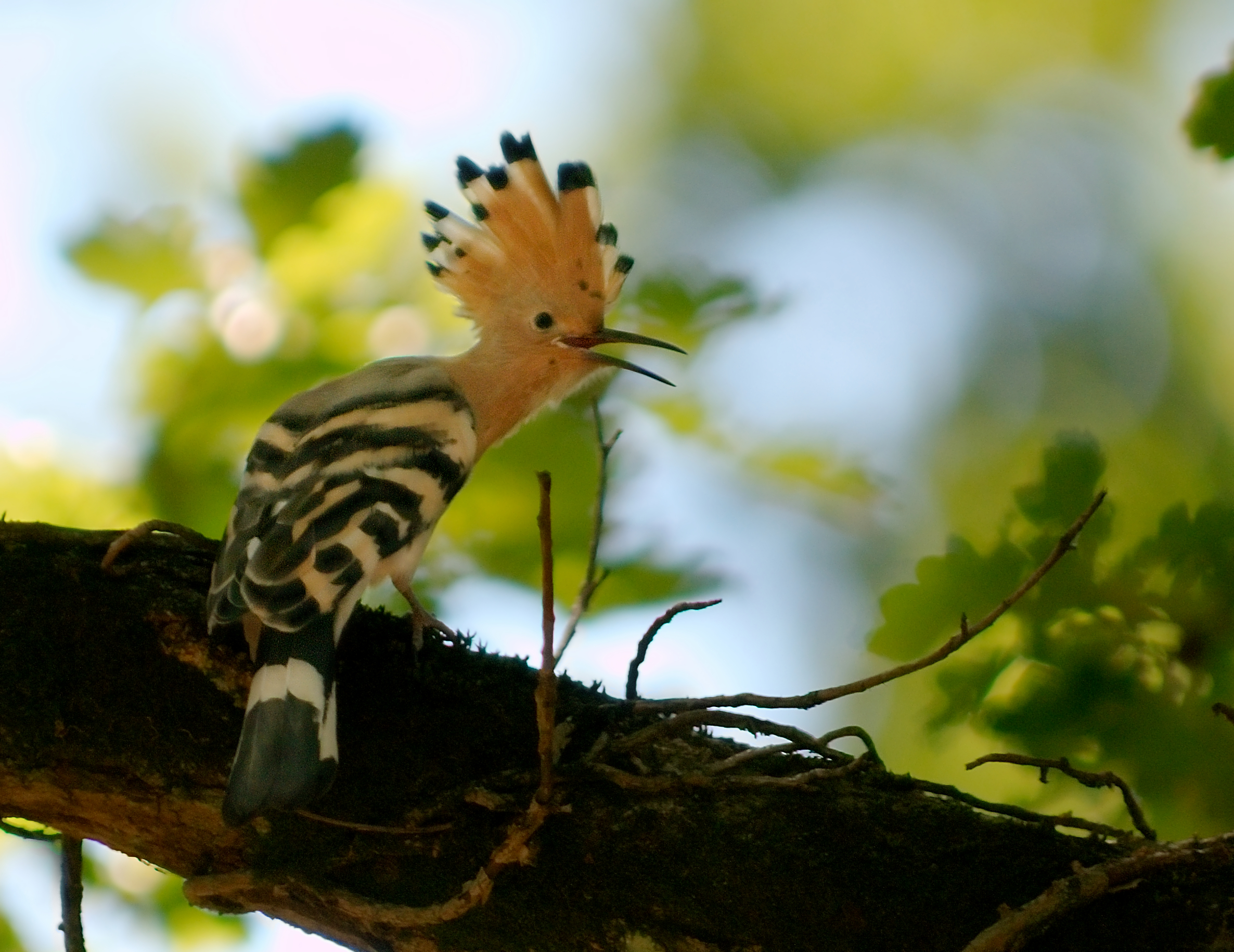
African hoopoe

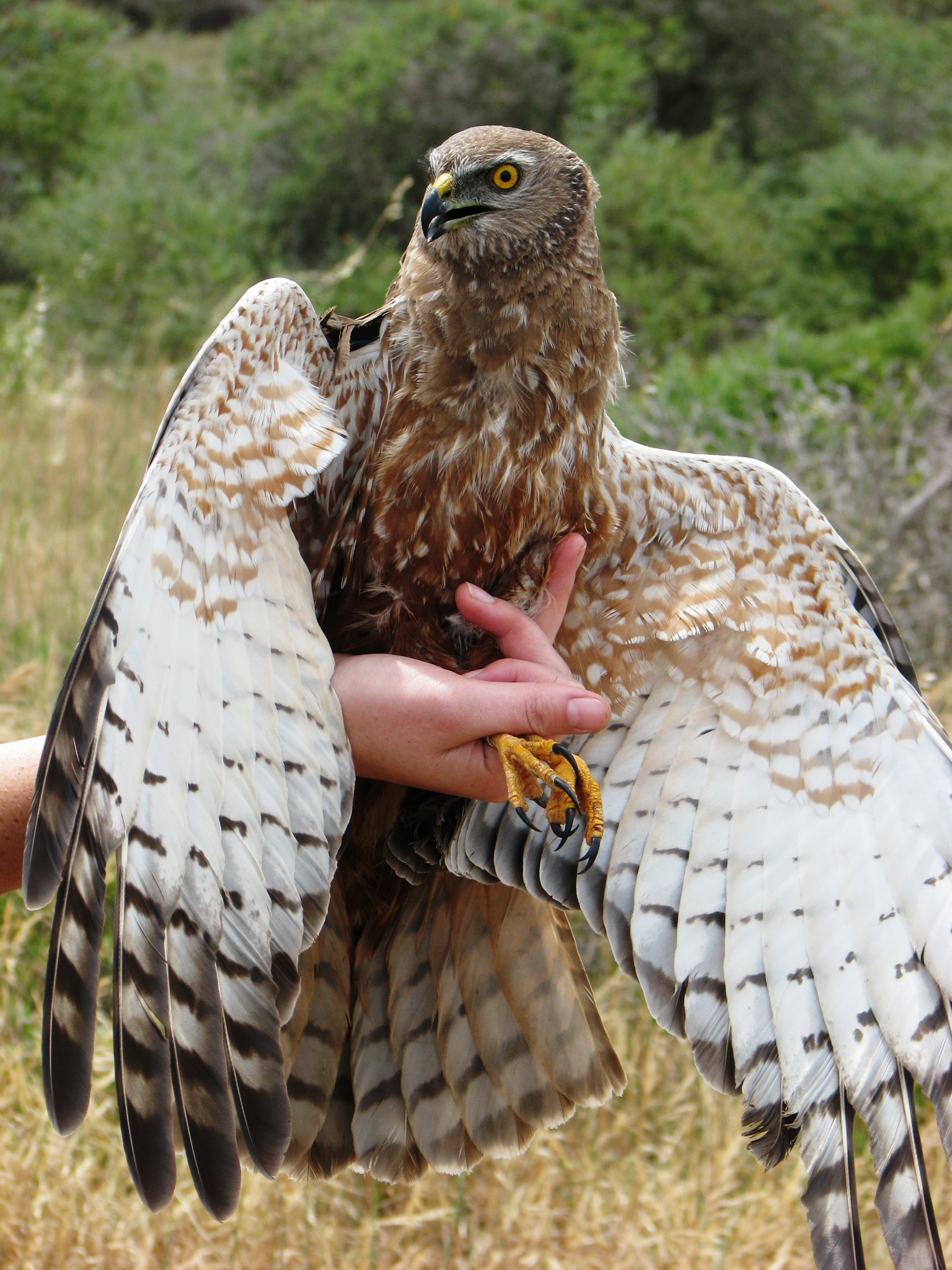
African marsh harrier

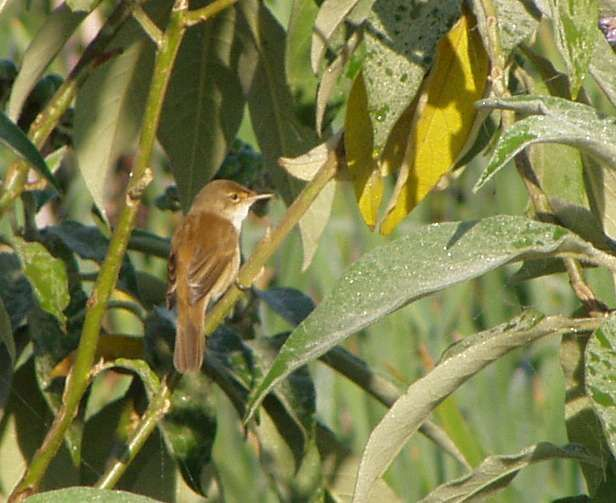
African reed warbler

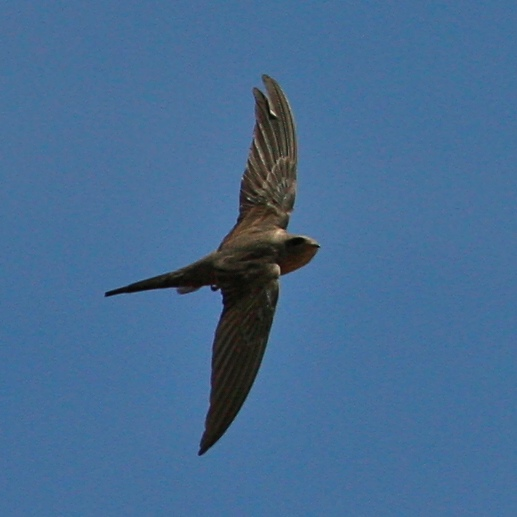
African palm swift

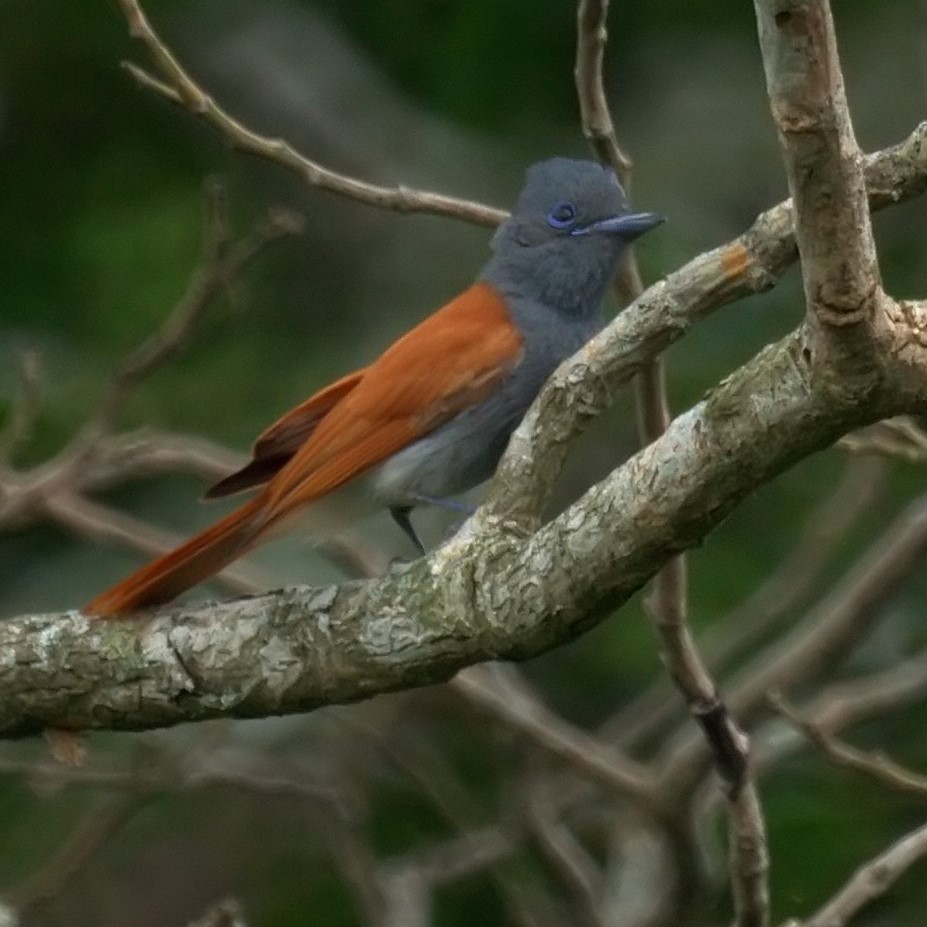
African paradise flycatcher

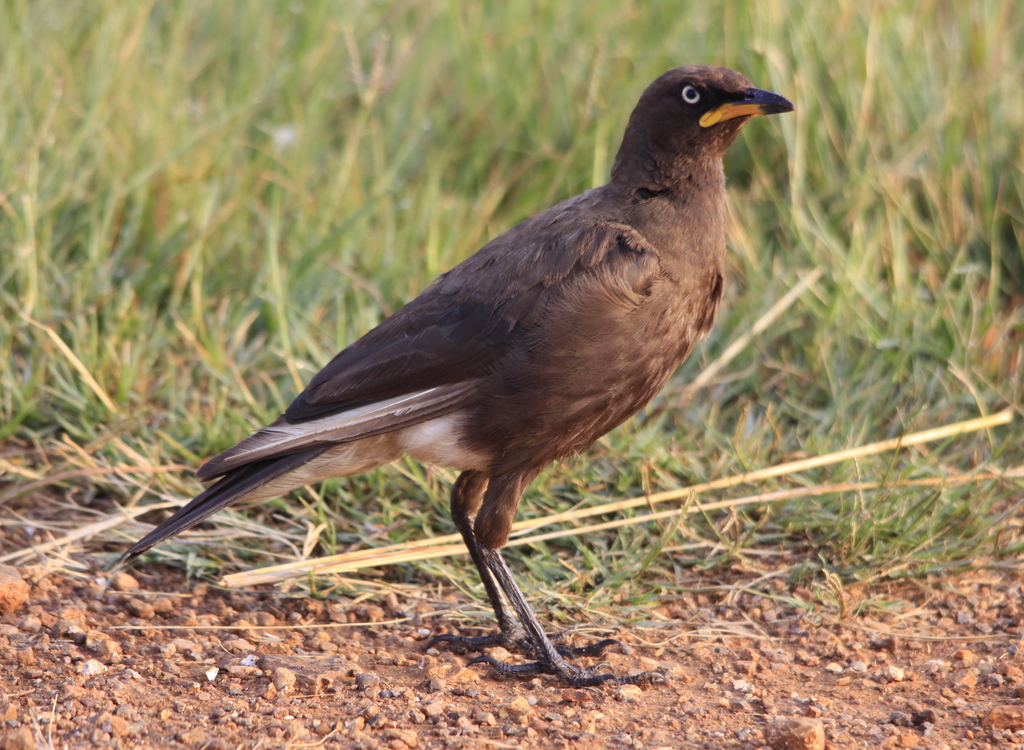
African pied starling

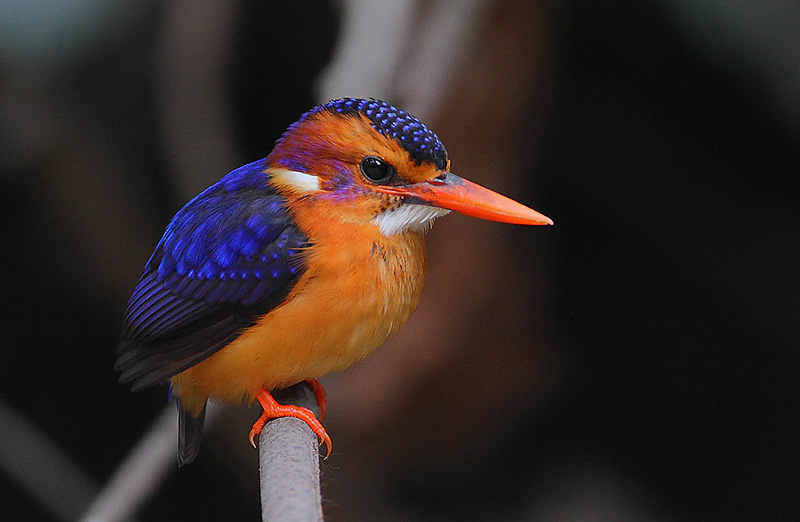
African pygmy kingfisher

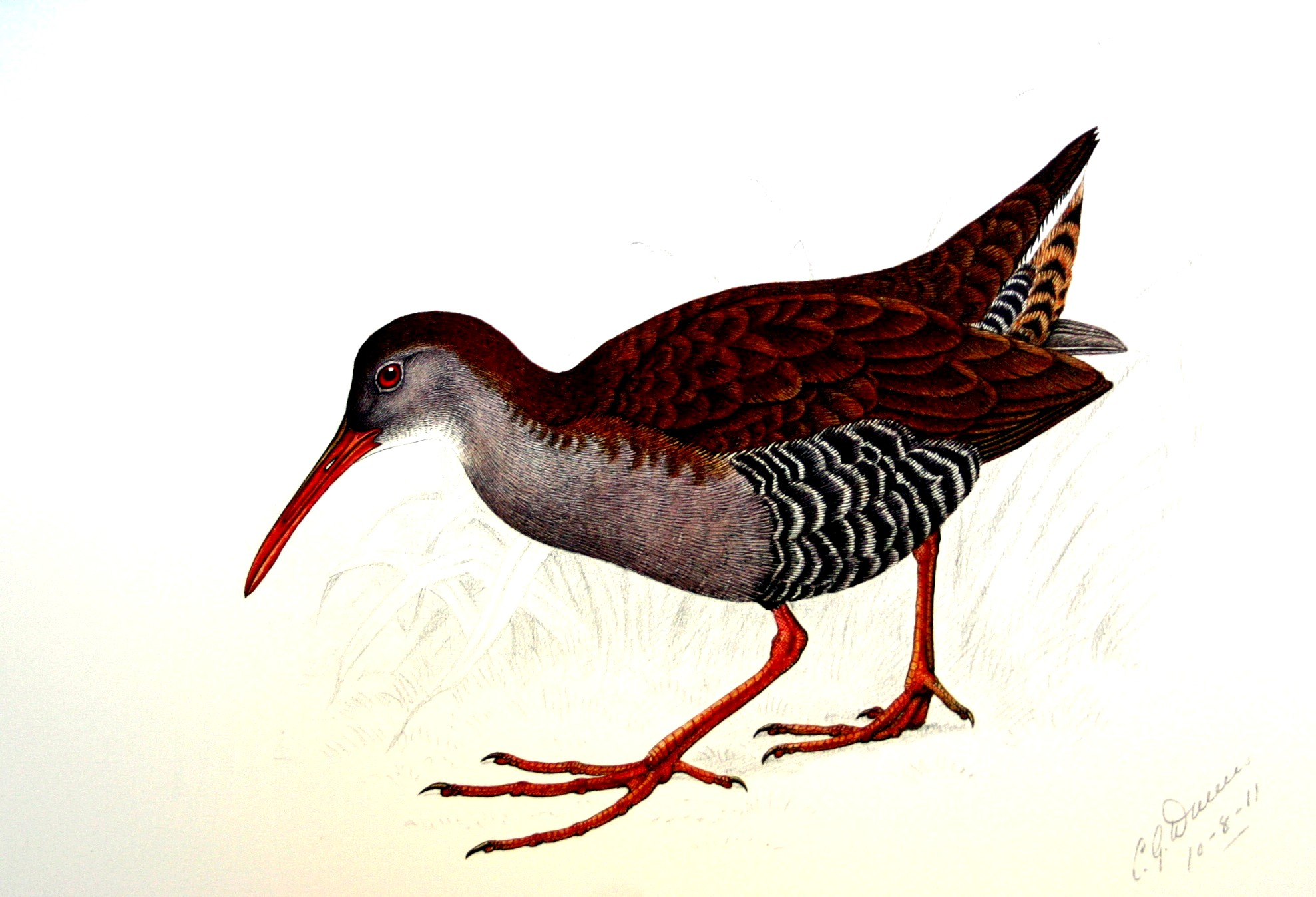
African rail

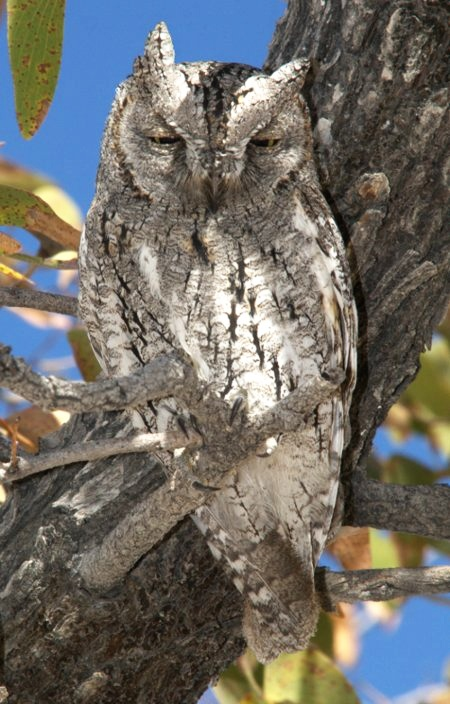
African scops owl

== See also ==
- List of birds
- Lists of birds by region
- List of birds of South Africa
- List of Southern African birds
