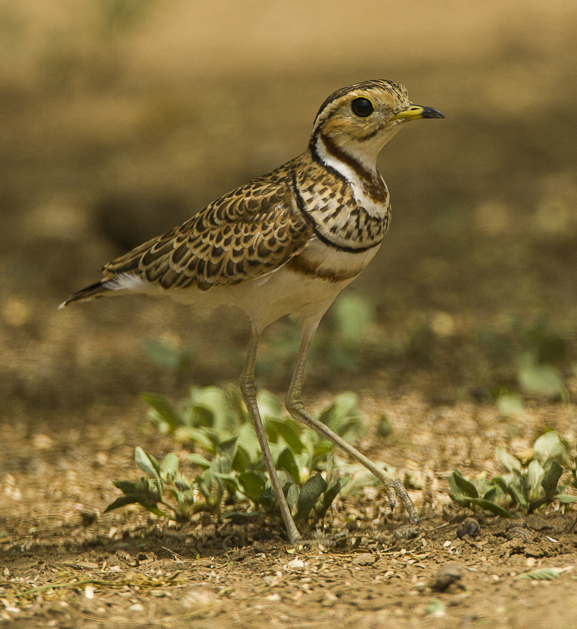
- Three-banded courser (Rhinoptilus cinctus)

Scientific classification
- Kingdom: Animalia
- Phylum: Chordata
- Class: Aves
- Order: Charadriiformes
- Family: Glareolidae
- Subfamily: Cursoriinae
- Genus: Rhinoptilus; Strickland, 1852

Type species
- Cursorius chalcopterus Temminck, 1824

Species
- R. cinctus R. chalcopterus R. bitorquatus

= Rhinoptilus =

Genus of birds

Rhinoptilus is a genus of coursers, a group of wading birds. There are three species, which breed in Africa and South Asia. They have long legs, short wings and long pointed bills which curve downwards. Although classed as waders, they inhabit deserts and similar arid regions. Like the pratincoles, the coursers are found in warmer parts of the Old World. They hunt insects by sight, pursuing them on foot.

Species in the genus have earlier been placed under other genus names including Macrotarsius (Blyth), Chalcopterus (Reich.) and Hemerodromus (Heuglin). Some characteristics of this largely African genus include a bill that is shorter and stouter than in Cursorius, the orbits are feathered and the 2nd and 3rd primaries nearly equal and the longest. The tarsus is long and scutellate, the feet are short and the outer toe is joined by partial webbing.

Their 2–3 eggs are laid on the ground.

== Species ==
The genus contains three species:

- Bronze-winged courser, Rhinoptilus chalcopterus – open woodland of sub-Saharan Africa
- Jerdon's courser, Rhinoptilus bitorquatus – tropical scrub jungle of Eastern Ghats of Andhra Pradesh (east-central India); extremely rare
- Three-banded courser, Rhinoptilus cinctus – tropical bushland and open woodland of northeast to central south Africa

The double-banded courser was formerly included in this genus but is now the only species placed in the genus Smutsornis.
