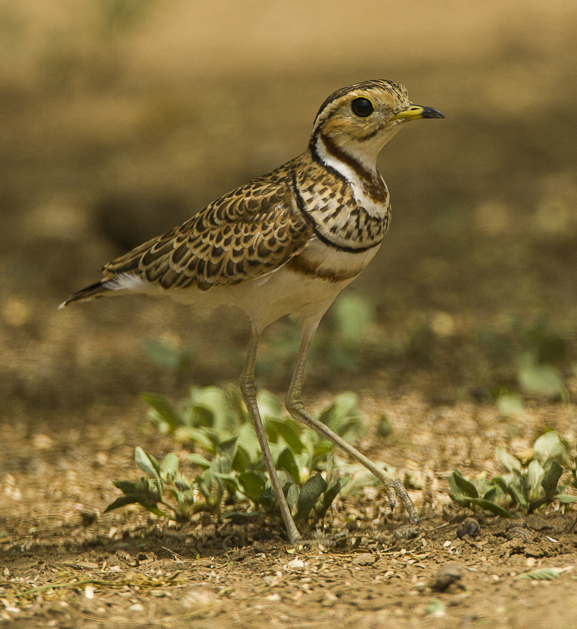

Conservation status
- Least Concern (IUCN 3.1)

Scientific classification
- Kingdom: Animalia
- Phylum: Chordata
- Class: Aves
- Order: Charadriiformes
- Family: Glareolidae
- Genus: Rhinoptilus
- Species: R. cinctus

Binomial name
- Rhinoptilus cinctus (Heuglin, 1863)

= Three-banded courser =

Species of bird

The three-banded courser or Heuglin's courser (Rhinoptilus cinctus) is a species of bird in the family Glareolidae. It is found in Angola, Botswana, Ethiopia, Kenya, Namibia, Rwanda, Somalia, Somaliland, South Africa, South Sudan, Tanzania, Uganda, Zambia, and Zimbabwe.

== Subspecies ==
There are five subspecies of three-banded courser:

- R. c. mayaudi, (Érard, Hemery & Pasquet, 1993): Ethiopia & northern Somalia
- R. c. balsaci, (Érard, Hemery & Pasquet, 1993): southern Somalia & northeast Kenya
- R. c. cinctus, (Heuglin, 1863): southeast South Sudan & northwest Kenya
- R. c. emini, (Zedlitz, 1914): southern Kenya, Tanzania & northern Zambia
- R. c. seeboehmi, (Sharpe, 1893): southern Angola & northern Namibia to Zimbabwe & northern South Africa

== Gallery ==
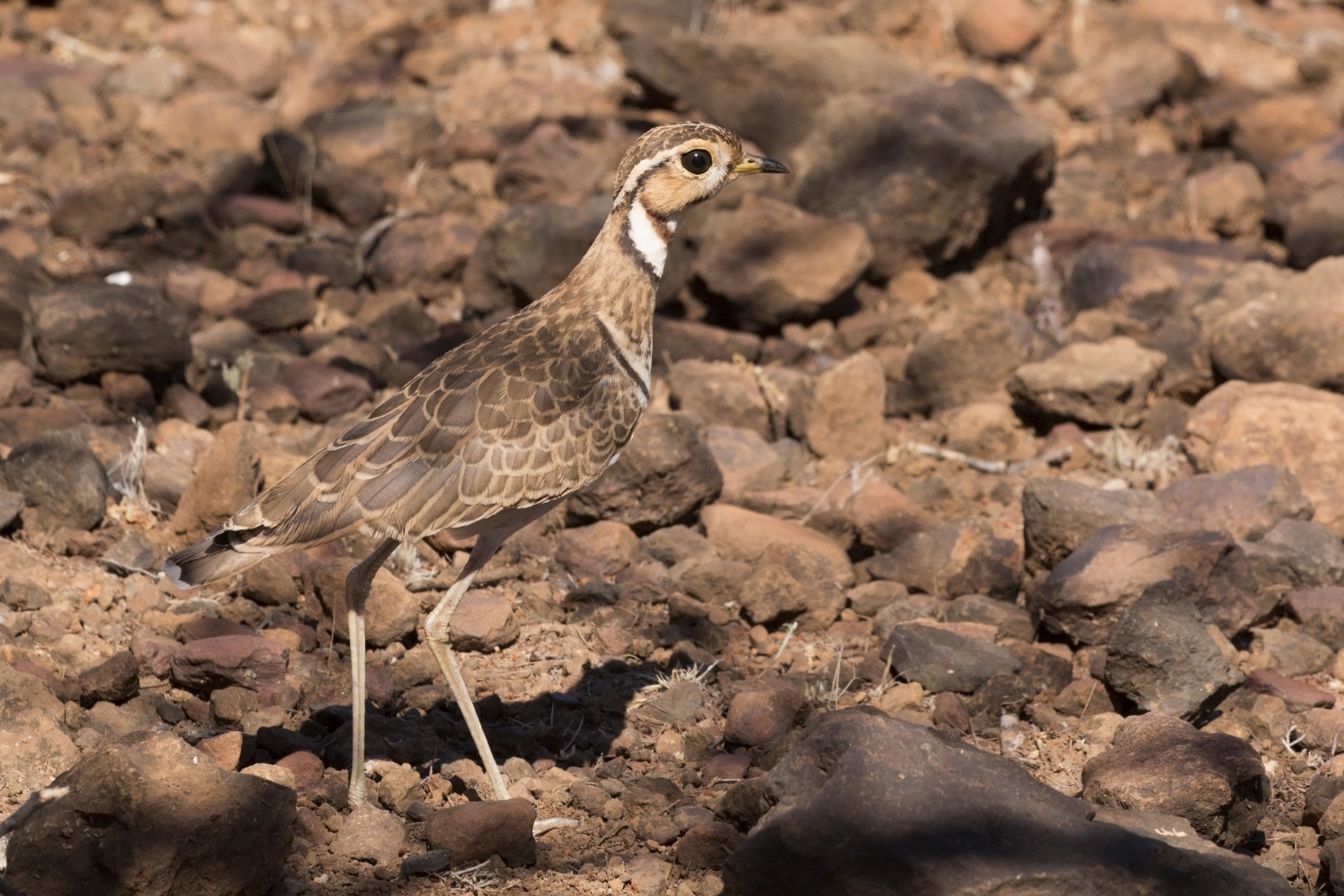
R. c. emini, Lake Baringo, Kenya

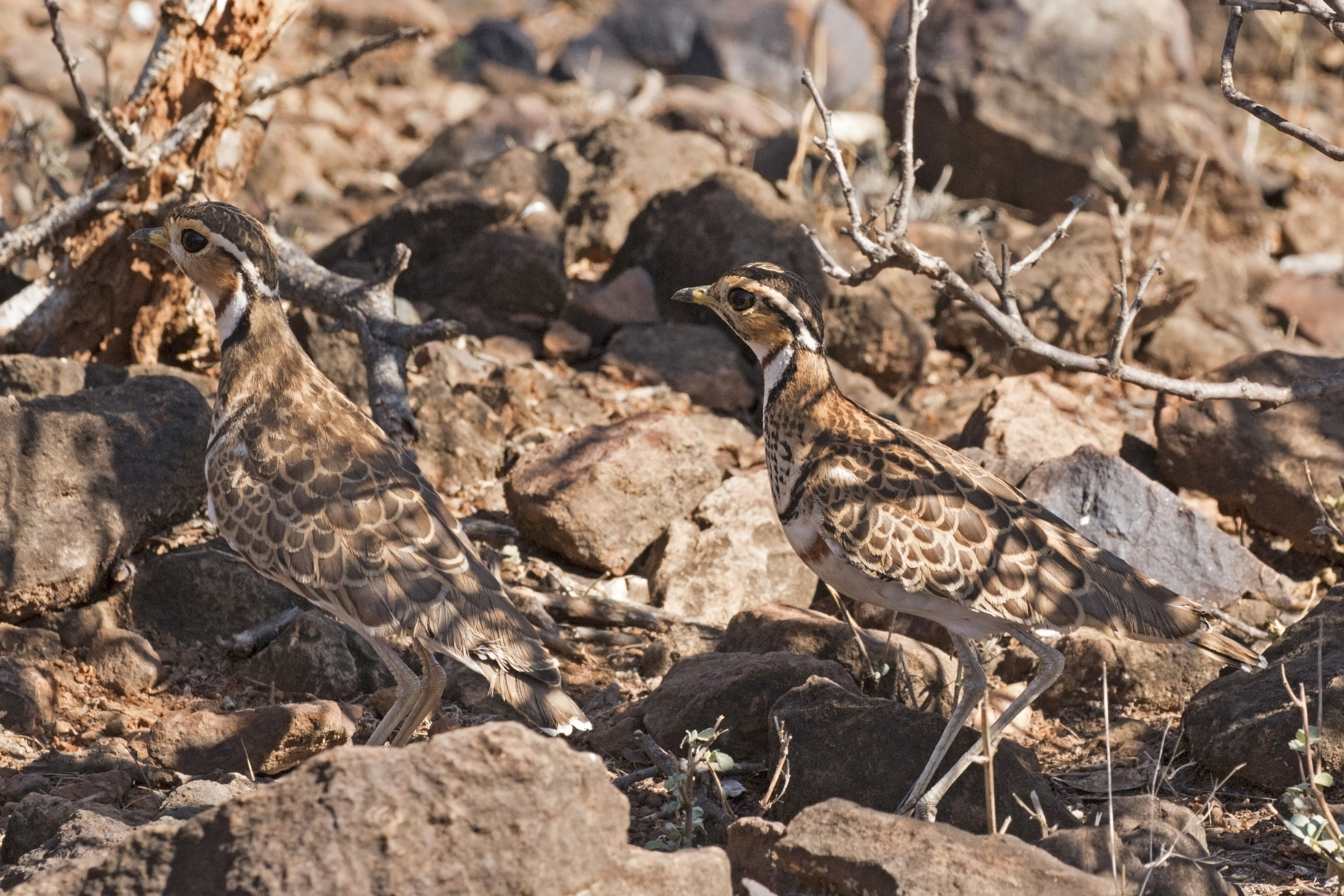
female (left) and male (right)
Lake Baringo, Kenya

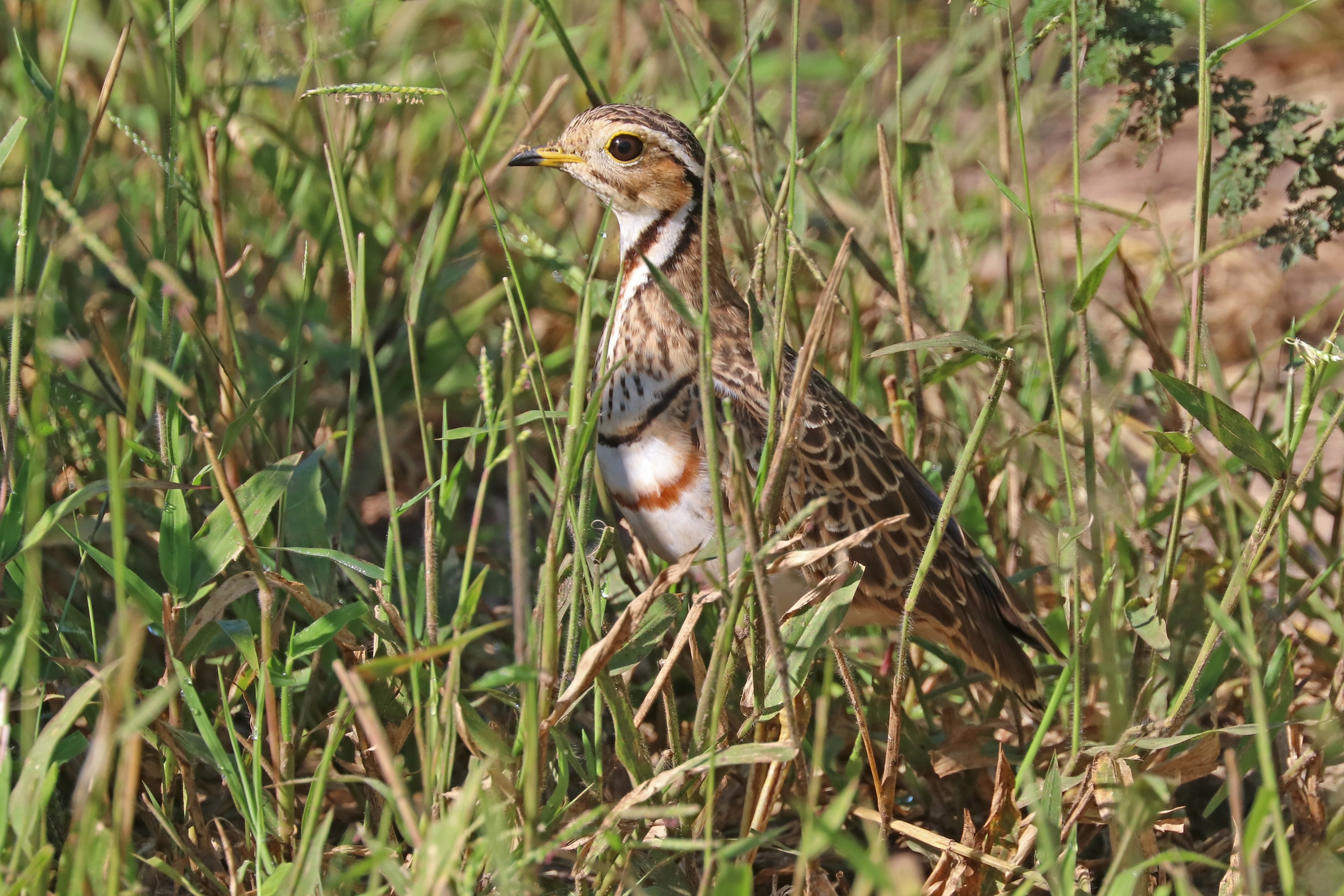
R. c. seeboehmi
Matetsi Safari Area, Zimbabwe

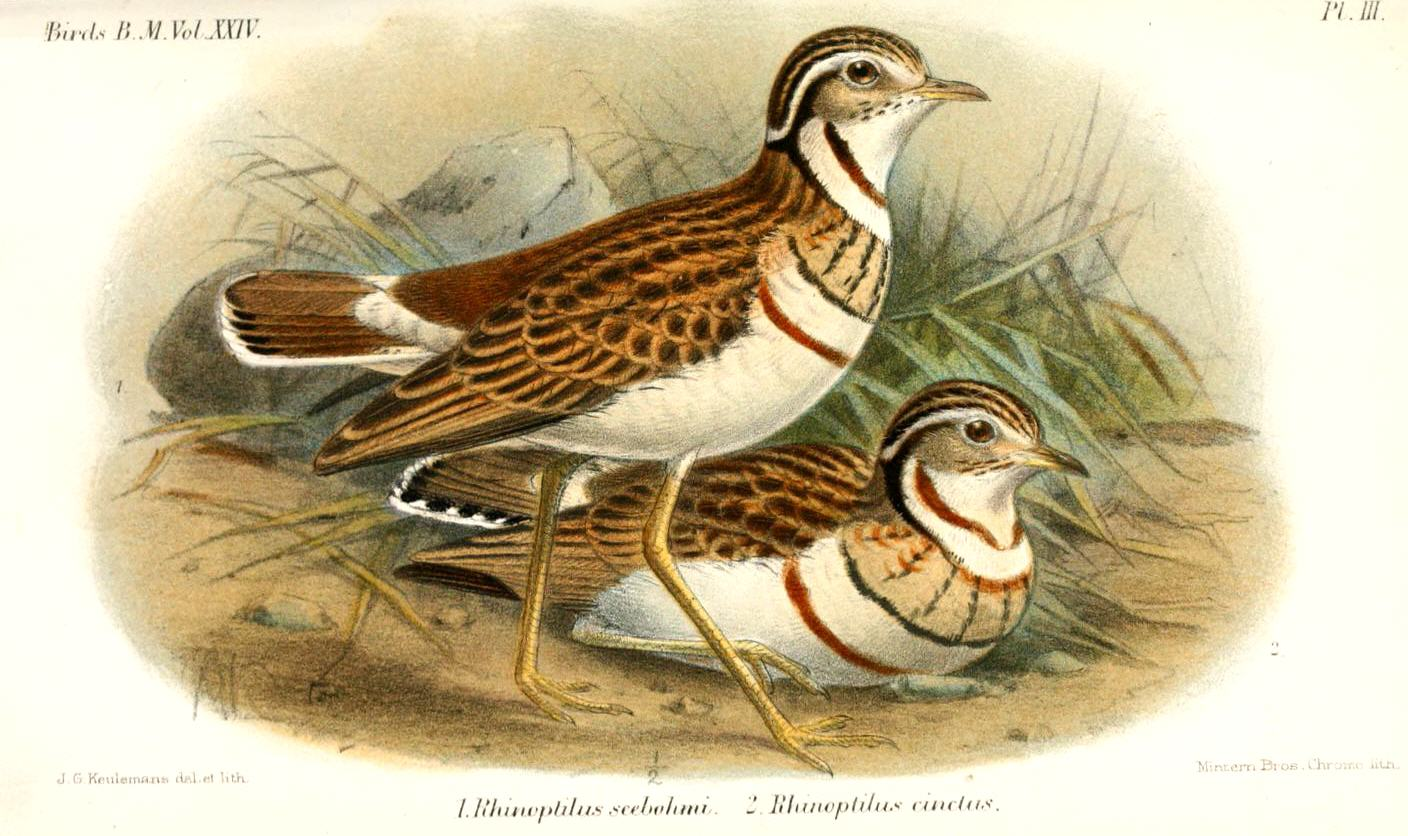
Nominate (right) and seeboehmi (left)
