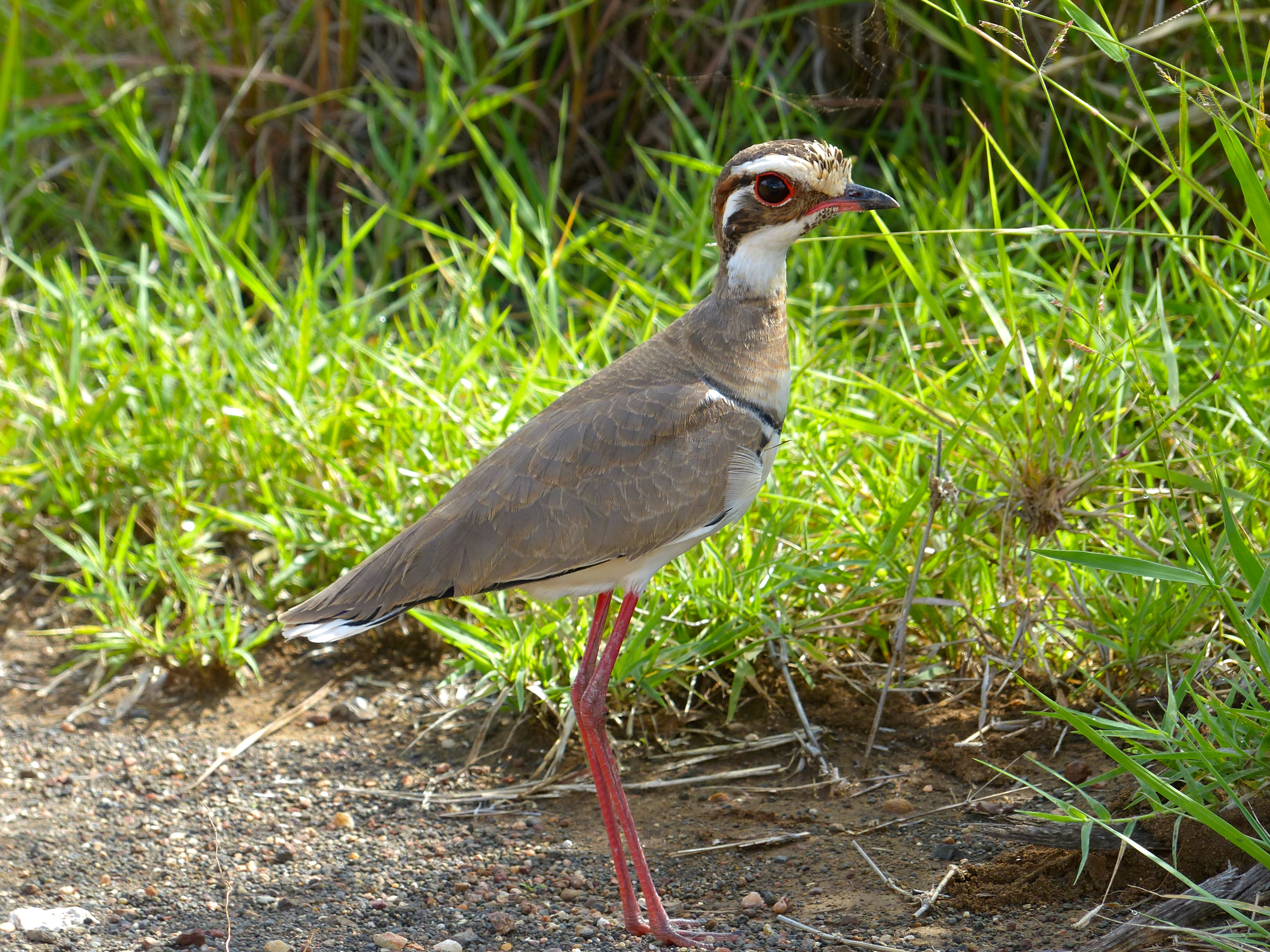

Conservation status
- Least Concern (IUCN 3.1)

Scientific classification
- Kingdom: Animalia
- Phylum: Chordata
- Class: Aves
- Order: Charadriiformes
- Family: Glareolidae
- Genus: Rhinoptilus
- Species: R. chalcopterus

Binomial name
- Rhinoptilus chalcopterus (Temminck, 1824)

= Bronze-winged courser =

Species of bird

The bronze-winged courser or violet-tipped courser (Rhinoptilus chalcopterus) is a species of bird in the family Glareolidae. This species is named for its characteristic bronze-tipped feathers that are visible during flight. It is found living throughout Sub-Saharan Africa, inhabiting semi-arid savannas and woodlands. This is a nocturnal species which mainly feeds on ground-dwelling insects. Bronze-winged coursers are typically solitary, only forming monogamous pairs for breeding. A female may produce 2-3 eggs per clutch, and the chicks receive parental care from both sexes when young. The bronze-winged courser is considered of Least Concern for conservation status, and is thought to be a very stable species.

== Description ==
The bronze-winged courser is a species of small wading birds with long legs and short wings. The bronze-winged courser is the largest of the coursers, with a body length of 25-29 centimeters, a wingspan up to 58 centimeters, and body weight between 91 and 220 grams.

=== Adult Recognition ===
The bronze-winged courser can be recognized by its characteristic head markings and overall coloration. The adult plumage differs from the juvenile plumage in this species. Mature adults have a dull grey-brown upper breast and back. The upper tail is white, while the remainder of the tail is dark brown and bordered with white. The breast features a thin black band that separates the brownish-grey upper chest from the buffy lower breast and belly. The head has distinct cream-white supercilium, forecrown, and posterior eyeline, as well as buffy upper neck and throat. The facial lores and ear-coverts are darker brown-black. The underwing coverts are white, contrasting with the dark black primaries which are tipped with iridescent copper to violet coloration. These copper wingtips are visible exclusively during flight–denoting the bird's common name the "bronze-winged courser". The bill is long and curved slightly downward, and appears black with a reddish-purple base. The eyes are large on the head, featuring a bright reddish-purple eye ring. The long legs are red in color.

The adult bronze-winged courser in flight may be visually confused with another group that is similar in appearance–the lapwings. Both have comparable underpart coloration and body size.

=== Juvenile Recognition ===
The juvenile bronze-winged courser sports a less vibrant plumage pattern in contrast to the adults. The upper feathers of the body are cream-yellow at the ends, and the breast features an even thinner dark band. Chicks of this species are speckled in appearance, looking almost like sandy burnt vegetation.

== Taxonomy ==
The bronze-winged courser (Rhinoptilus chalcopterus) is a species of courser within the family Glareolidae. The coursers are a part of the order Charadriiformes in the class Aves. This species has no classified subspecies.

== Range ==
The bronze-winged courser is found in parts of Sub-Saharan Africa, and can be found residing in different areas of the continent according to season. It is thought that the bronze-winged courser spends its breeding season in the southern parts of its range, and migrates north after breeding. The breeding season spans from July to December.

Historical records show the bronze-winged courser present in many localities at various times through the year, including but not limited to: Eritrea, Nigeria, Ghana, Sudan, Kenya, Democratic Republic of the Congo, Malawi, Botswana, Zambia, Zimbabwe, Gambia, and more recently Ethiopia.

== Habitat and Disruption ==
The bronze-winged courser inhabits semi-arid environments such as dry savanna woodlands with areas of dense brush. This species can rarely be found in open areas including grasslands located nearby wooded savannas. They tend to inhabit lower elevations, though can be found within areas of elevation up to 2,350 meters. Breeding is thought to occur within a lower elevation range, likely not surpassing elevations of more than 1700 meters.

The bronze-winged courser is susceptible to disturbance by human activities, particularly related to land alteration of its habitat due to farming or agricultural practices. Clearing woodlands and similar environment reduced the habitat available for bronze-winged courser. This species is also predated on by other birds in its environment, including the bateleur and the tawny eagle.

== Behavior ==
=== Vocalizations ===
The bronze-winged courser can be heard by its calls at night, but is otherwise a quiet species.

=== Diet ===
The bronze-winged courser is thought to be a strict insectivore–presumably feeding on ground dwelling insects such as grasshoppers. The bronze-winged courser is a nocturnal feeder, foraging in a plover-like manner–pecking at the ground to capture prey while walking or running around.

=== Reproduction ===
The bronze-winged courser is a solitary species which forms monogamous pairs for breeding. Though forming pairs, the couples are territorial, and keep their adjacent nests at least 100 meters from one another. Breeding occurs during the dry season. Bronze-winged coursers typically select nesting areas that have been impacted by recent burns or fires. They usually do not construct a true nest, but rather clear a small "nest" like spot, often no more than a 1 centimeter deep indentation in the ground. The bronze-winged courser nests in open sites with good visibility. Within the nest, the bronze-winged courser lays a clutch of up to 3 eggs, which are camouflaged to blend into their environments. This camouflaging of the eggs allows higher survival rates with such an open nesting environment. Egg camouflaging can vary in color, and closely mimics the environment in which they are laid. Eggs can appear cream to yellow, with hints of grey, sepia, reddish-brown, darker black, and even purple tones. Eggs are small in size, measuring anywhere from 33-40mm x 25-28mm. The eggs are incubated by both parents for 25–27 days, during which the parents alternate between sitting on the nest while the other stands watch close by. If approached by a predator, the parents will flee the nest and leave the eggs in the open. It has been found that bronze-winged coursers will move at least 5 meters away from the nest if threatened.

Once hatched, the chicks receive parental care from both sexes. It is unknown how long the chicks fledging period lasts. The plumage on chicks of the bronze-winged courser is white from below, and appears speckled with red-brown and black from above. The legs are dark grey and the bill is black.

== Status and Conservation ==
The bronze-winged courser is considered of Least Concern (LC) in nature protection. This species is not globally threatened, and is highly protected by the establishment of nature and game reserves within their range.

It is difficult to record true population numbers of bronze-winged coursers. This species is often underestimated and size is challenging to predict.

Causes of mortality in the bronze-winged courser are often linked to traffic deaths. This nocturnal species can be found running on roads at night, where it may occasionally face fatalities from motor vehicle encounters. Other mortalities are normally due to predation by local wildlife.
