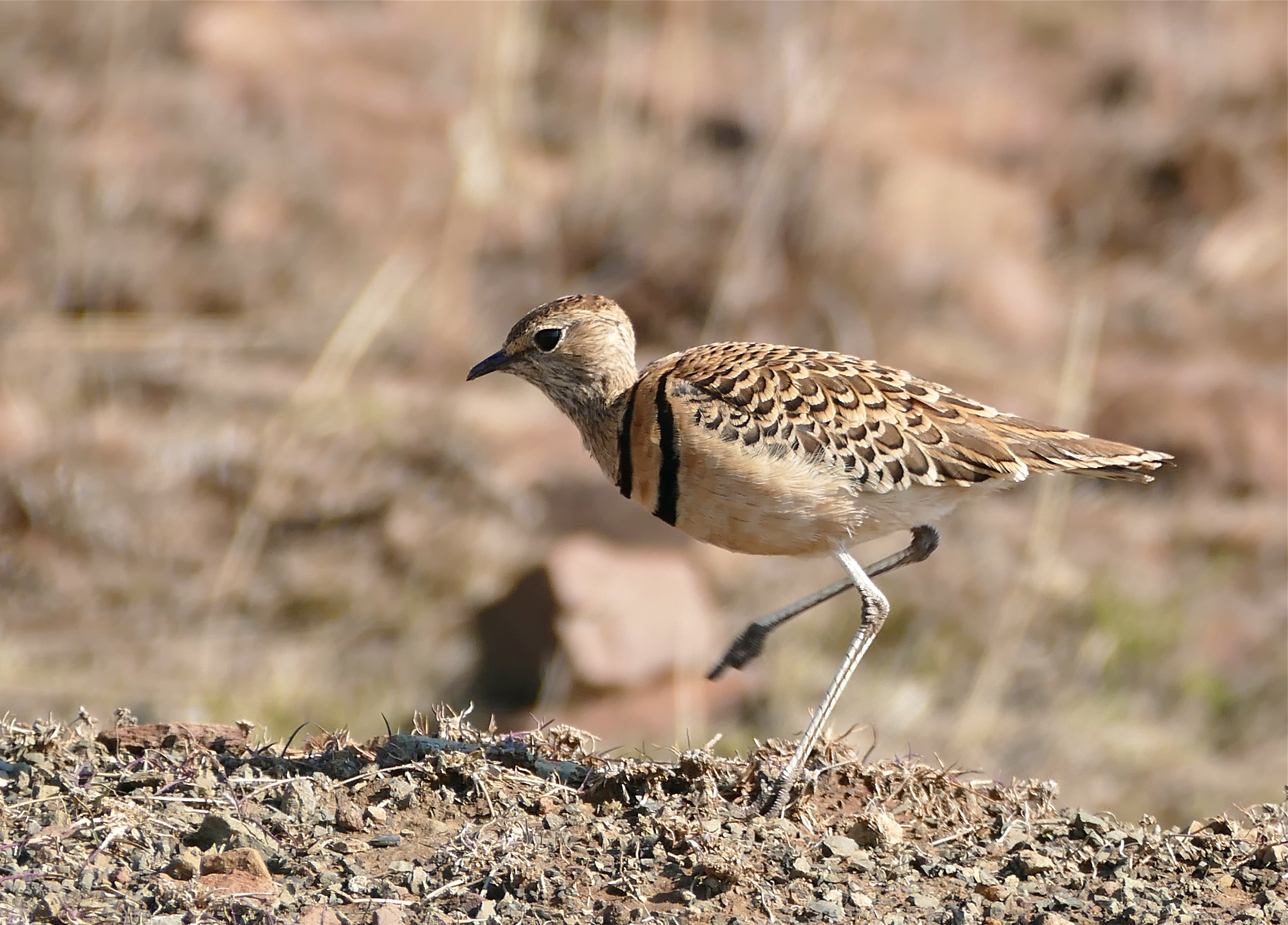
- In Mountain Zebra National Park, Eastern Cape, South Africa

Conservation status
- Least Concern (IUCN 3.1)

Scientific classification
- Kingdom: Animalia
- Phylum: Chordata
- Class: Aves
- Order: Charadriiformes
- Family: Glareolidae
- Genus: Smutsornis; Roberts, 1922
- Species: S. africanus

Binomial name
- Smutsornis africanus (Temminck, 1807)

Synonyms
- Rhinoptilus africanus

= Double-banded courser =

Species of bird

The double-banded courser (Smutsornis africanus), also known as the two-banded courser, is a species of bird in the family Glareolidae. It was formerly placed in the genus Rhinoptilus but is now the only species placed in the genus Smutsornis.

== Taxonomy ==
The double-banded courser was formally described in 1807 as Cursorius africanus by the Dutch zoologist Coenraad Jacob Temminck. The specimen had been collected by François Levaillant in Namaqualand on the west coast of southern Africa. This species was formerly placed in the genus Rhinoptilus. A 2022 molecular genetic study by David Cerný and Rossy Natale found that the double-banded courser diverged genetically from the other species in Rhinoptilus. The species was therefore moved to the resurrected genus Smutsornis that had been introduced in 1922 by South African zoologist Austin Roberts. The genus name combines the name of the South African politician Jan Smuts with the Ancient Greek ορνις/ornis, ορνιθος/ornithos meaning "bird".

Eight subspecies are recognised:

- S. a. raffertyi (Mearns, EA, 1915) – Eritrea to Ethiopia and Djibouti
- S. a. hartingi (Sharpe, RB, 1893) – southeastern Ethiopia (Ogaden Depression) and Somalia
- S. a. gracilis (Fischer, GA & Reichenow, A, 1884) – Kenya and Tanzania
- S. a. bisignatus (Hartlaub, KJG, 1865) – southwestern Angola
- S. a. erlangeri (Niethammer, GT & Wolters, HE, 1966) – northwestern Namibia (Etosha region)
- S. a. traylori (Irwin, MPS, 1963) – northwestern Botswana (Makgadikgadi system) and western Zimbabwe
- S. a. africanus (Temminck, CJ, 1807) – Namibia (except northwest), western and southern Botswana, and northwestern South Africa (northern Northern Cape)
- S. a. granti (Sclater, WL, 1921) – western Cape Province and Karoo of South Africa

== Description ==
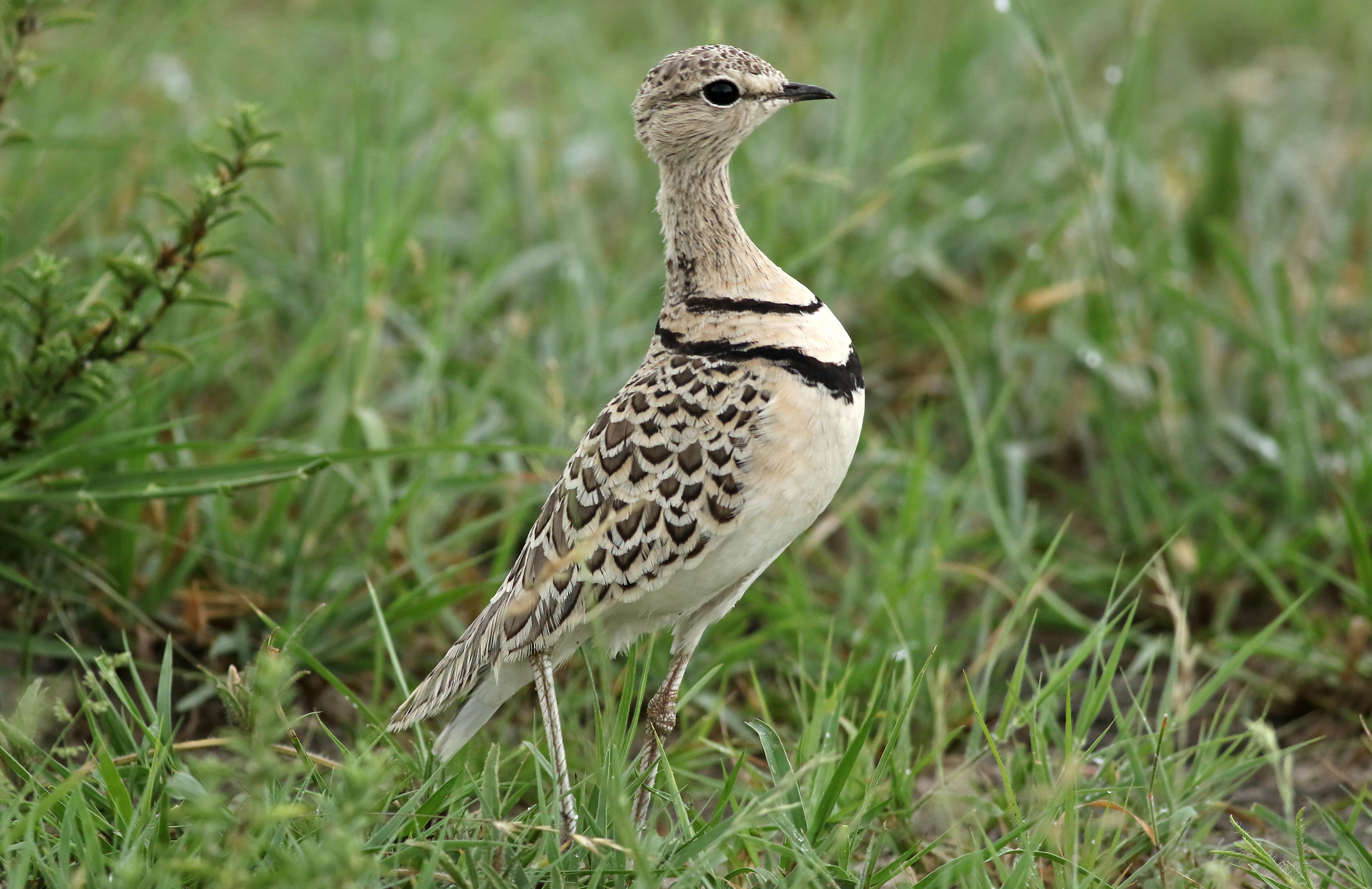
At the Khama Rhino Sanctuary, Botswana

The bird's crown is pale and streaked with brown/black feathers. A narrow black stripe extends from the base of the bill, through the eye to the nape. The cheeks, chin, throat and neck are buff/white flecked with dark brown. The feather of the back and wing coverts are sandy brown with dark centres and broadly edged with white/buff. The short bill is blackish, eyes are dark brown and the legs and feet are pale grey.

== Distribution and habitat ==
The double-banded courser is found in Ethiopia, Somalia, South Africa, and Tanzania. The bird is widespread enough to have practically no chance of becoming endangered or extinct. The double-banded courser lives and breeds in flat, stony or gravelly, semi-desert terrains with firm, sandy soil and tufty grass or thorn scrub.

== Behaviour ==
=== Breeding ===
Double-banded coursers breed in monogamous pairs. Breeding begins after a mating dance where the male dances in semicircles around the female. The female then lays one egg, which the parents take hour-long shifts incubating; the egg hatches after about twenty-five days. The chicks leave the nest within 24 hours of hatching, although staying close to the nest until 3–4 days old, at which point it joins its parents. Both adults feed the chick with small insects until it becomes self-providing at about 5–6 weeks old.

The breeding season varies by country:

Ethiopia - April–June; Somalia - February–July (mainly May–June); Tanzania - November; South Africa - all year, peaking in October–November.

=== Feeding ===
The bird eats mostly insects, such as ants, termites, and beetles. It catches its prey by quickly running after it and jabbing with its bill.

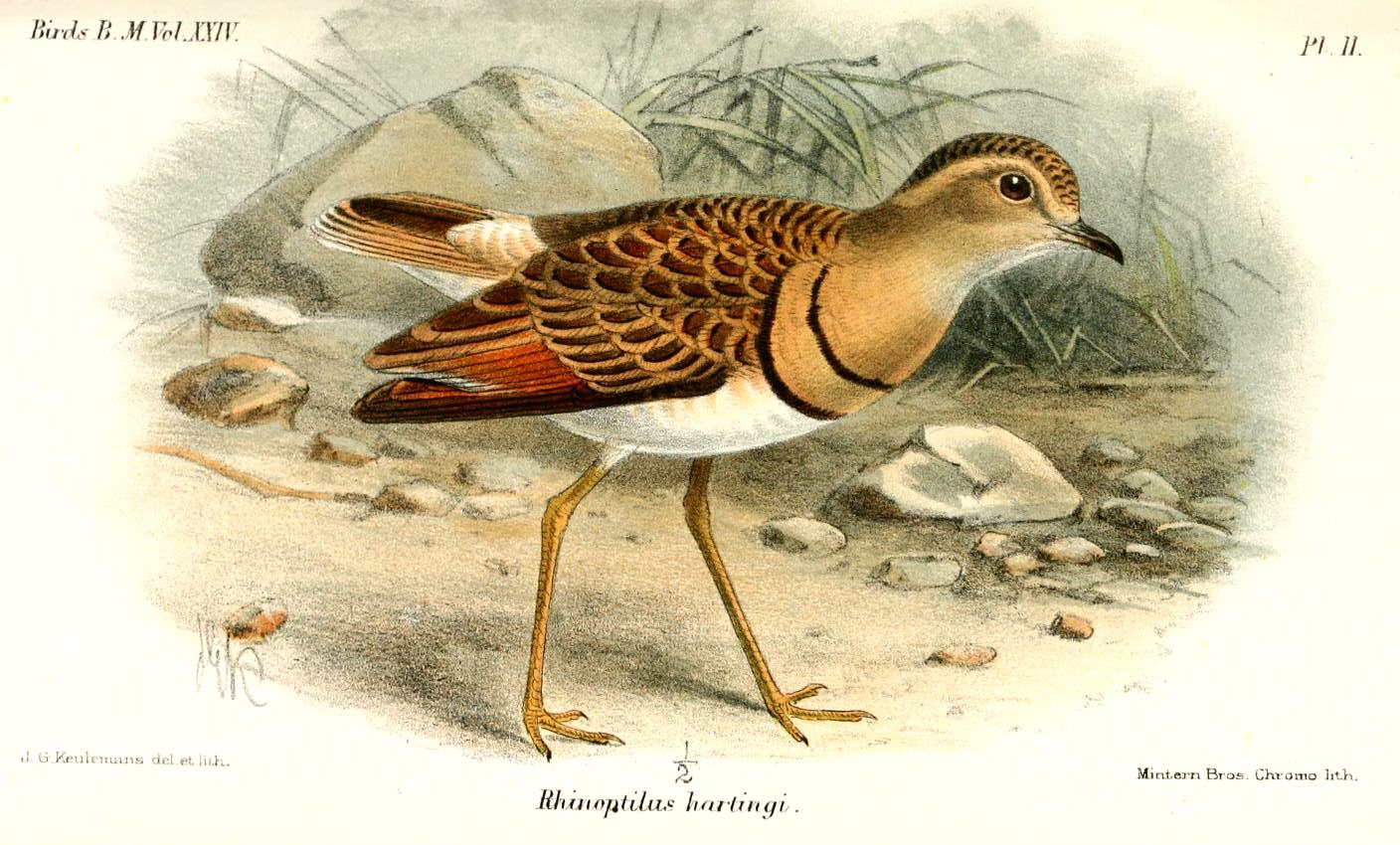
R. a. hartingi
