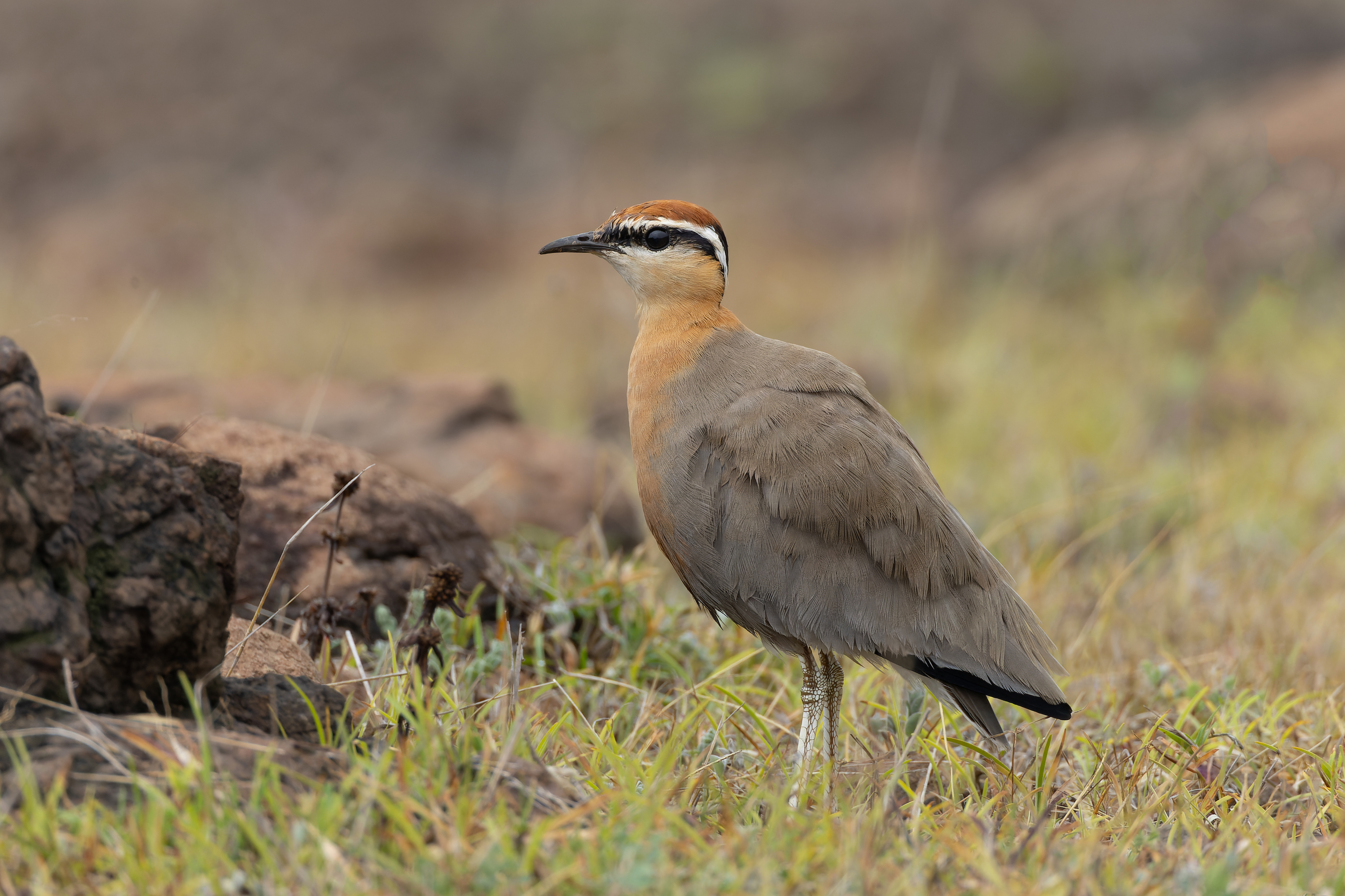
- Indian courser (Cursorius coromandelicus) in Bhigwan, Maharashtra, India

Conservation status
- Near Threatened (IUCN 3.1)

Scientific classification
- Kingdom: Animalia
- Phylum: Chordata
- Class: Aves
- Order: Charadriiformes
- Family: Glareolidae
- Genus: Cursorius
- Species: C. coromandelicus

Binomial name
- Cursorius coromandelicus (Gmelin, JF, 1789)
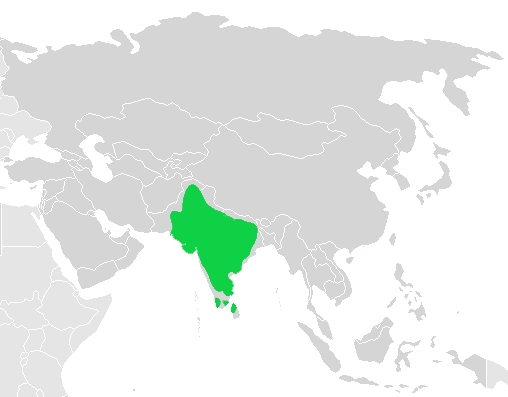
- Range of C. coromandelicus

= Indian courser =

Species of bird

The Indian courser (Cursorius coromandelicus) is a species of courser found in mainland South Asia, mainly in the plains bounded by the Ganges and Indus river system. Like other coursers, it is a ground bird that can be found in small groups as they forage for insects in dry open semi-desert country.

== Taxonomy ==
The Indian courser was formally described in 1789 by the German naturalist Johann Friedrich Gmelin in his revised and expanded edition of Carl Linnaeus's Systema Naturae. He placed it with the plovers in the genus Charadrius and coined the binomial name Charadrius coromandelicus. Gmelin based his description on the "Coromandel plover" that had been described in 1785 by the English ornithologist John Latham in his A General Synopsis of Birds. Latham in turn based his own description on a hand-coloured print that accompanied Comte de Buffon's Histoire Naturelle des Oiseaux. The Indian courser is now placed in the genus Cursorius that was introduced by Latham in 1790. The genus name is from Latin cursor meaning "runner", from currere, "to run". The specific epithet is from the Coromandel Coast of India, the type locality. The species is monotypic: no subspecies are recognised.

== Description ==
This courser is widespread in South Asia and overlaps with some other species such as the similar looking cream-coloured courser. This species is however brighter coloured than the cream-coloured courser and has a broader black eye-stripe that begins at the base of the beak. The crown is chestnut and the breast is rufous. The nape has a dark black patch where the long longer feathers forming the white stripe meet. In flight, the rump appears white and the wing tip is not as contrastingly black as in the cream-coloured courser. The sexes are alike.

The long legs are whitish and as in other coursers have only three forward pointing toes.

The species is closely related to other coursers in the region and are considered to form a superspecies with Cursorius cursor, Cursorius rufus and Cursorius temminckii.

== Distribution and habitat ==
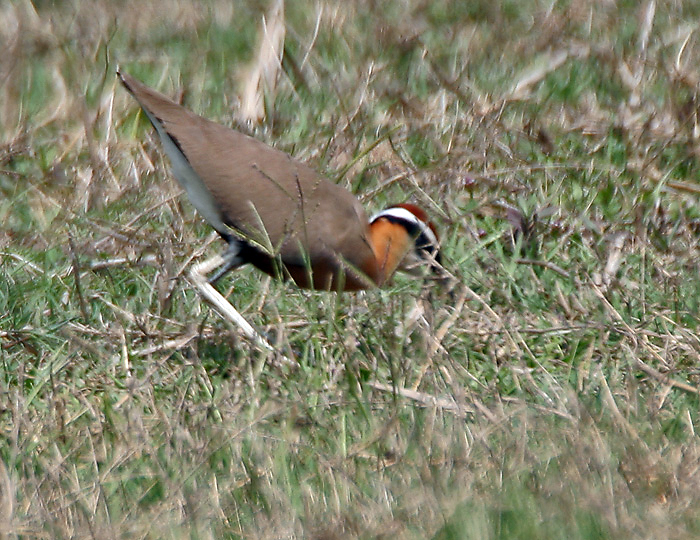
At Keoladeo National Park

This species occurs in dry stony, scrubby or rocky country but rarely on sandy terrain from the Indus valley east short of Bangladesh and south to the tip of Peninsular India. It sometimes occurs in the dry zone of northern Sri Lanka. The wet forest zones are avoided. In southern India, the drier zone on the east coast, the Coromandel region, where it is not uncommon gives it the species name. It is also found patchily distributed in other parts of the peninsula. Other areas where they are commonly seen include the Deccan plateau and the arid regions of northwestern India in Rajasthan and Gujarat. It is resident in some areas but makes local movements.

== Behaviour and ecology ==
These birds are usually seen in small flocks. They are usually found where the grass is not taller than them, since the tall grass blocks their view. They feed on insects mainly termites, beetles, crickets and grasshoppers picked up from the ground in stubbly or uncultivated fields. They run in spurts on the ground but take to flight with a hoarse creaky gwaat call. The flight is strong with rapid wing beats. They fly low and begin to run after landing.

They breed mainly from March to August. Records exist from mid May in southern India and Sri Lanka and mid April in Darbhanga. They nest in a scrape on bare stony ground laying 2 or 3 speckled and well-camouflaged eggs that are very spherical. The chicks are protectively coloured and on alarm crouch and remain immobile making them extremely difficult to spot. Adults do not call or display when the nest or chicks are approached. The chicks are able to move upon hatching but are initially fed by the parents and begin to forage on their own after a week.

== Threats ==
The arid and open habitats used by the Indian courser are threatened by human activities such as construction and agriculture. In parts of Gujarat, the species was very common in short-grass covered open and fallow lands but has vanished in many areas. In some areas, vehicular activity and industrialization have destroyed habitats where they formerly occurred.

== Gallery ==
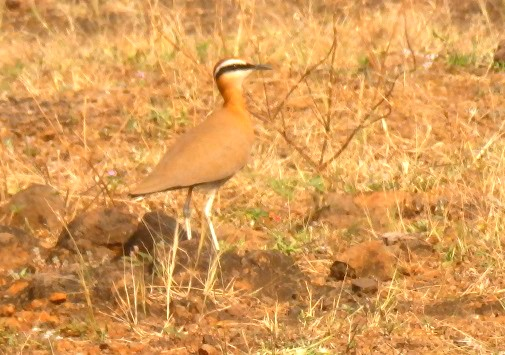
Indian courser at Mayureshwar, Maharashtra, India

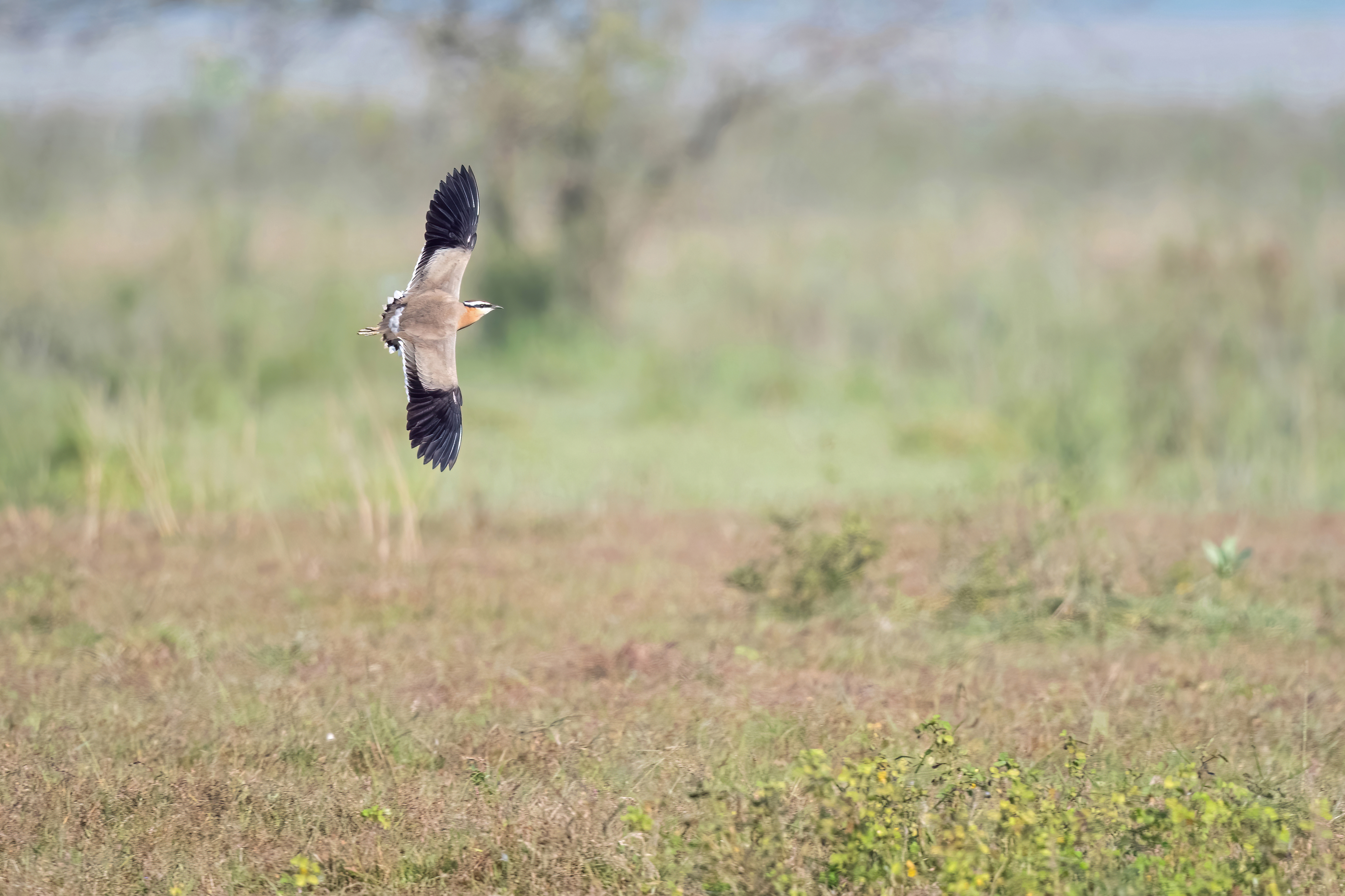
In flight at Koshi Tappu Wildlife Reserve, Nepal
