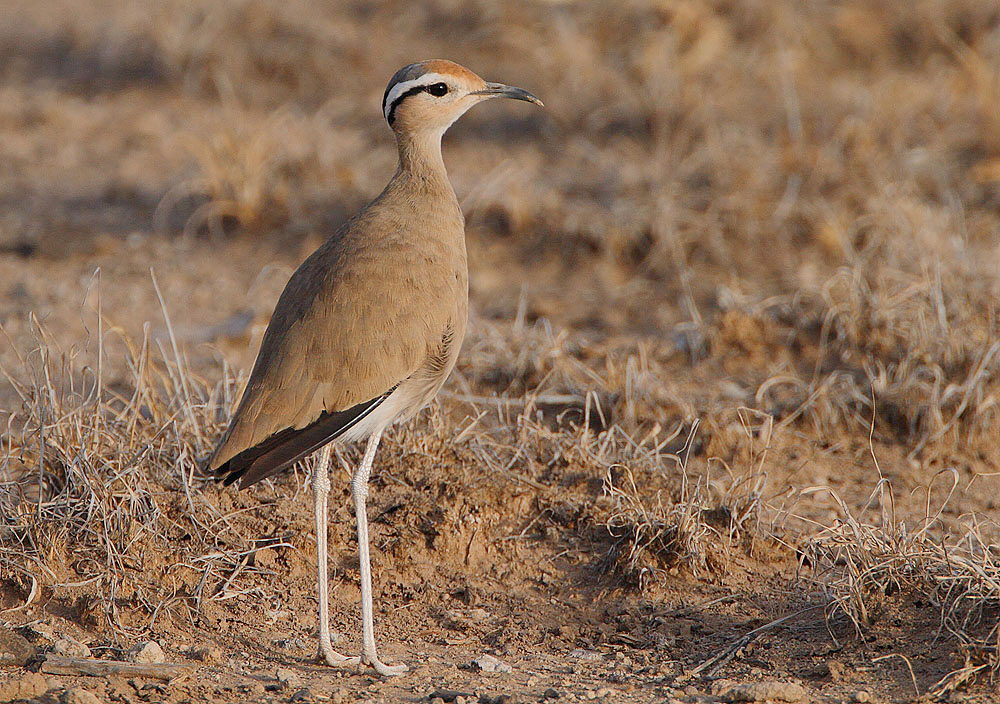

Conservation status
- Least Concern (IUCN 3.1)

Scientific classification
- Kingdom: Animalia
- Phylum: Chordata
- Class: Aves
- Order: Charadriiformes
- Family: Glareolidae
- Genus: Cursorius
- Species: C. somalensis

Binomial name
- Cursorius somalensis Shelley, 1885

= Somali courser =

Species of bird

The Somali courser (Cursorius somalensis) is a wader in the pratincole and courser family Glareolidae, native to eastern Africa in Eritrea, eastern Ethiopia, Somalia, extreme southeast South Sudan, and northern and eastern Kenya. It is unusual among waders in being a bird of open dry country, preferably semi-desert, short grasslands, and burnt grass, where it typically hunts its insect prey by running on the ground.

It is 19–22 cm long, very similar to cream-coloured courser in most characteristics, but differing from it in having a darker, more greyish-brown body colour, and most obviously when in flight, in having only the outer half of the wing black underneath (the whole underwing is black in cream-coloured courser); the inner underwing being the same sandy-brown as the body. Like cream-coloured courser, it has a black stripe and white eyebrow behind its eyes, which when seen from behind look like a "V".

== Taxonomy ==
Two subspecies are accepted:

- C. s. somaliensis Shelley, 1885 — Eritrea, eastern Ethiopia, and Somalia.
- C. s. littoralis Erlanger, 1905 — extreme southeast South Sudan, northern and eastern Kenya, and southern Somalia.

Acceptance as a distinct species is relatively recent, since near the end of the 20th century; previously, its two subspecies had been considered as either subspecies of cream-coloured courser by some authors, or by others as subspecies of the Southern African Burchell's courser.

In the north of its range, it overlaps to a small extent with non-breeding (wintering) cream-coloured coursers; here, care is needed in identification.
