= G. nuchalis =

G. nuchalis may refer to:

- Garrulax nuchalis
- Glareola nuchalis
- Gobius nuchalis
- Grallaria nuchalis
