= Koozhavali =

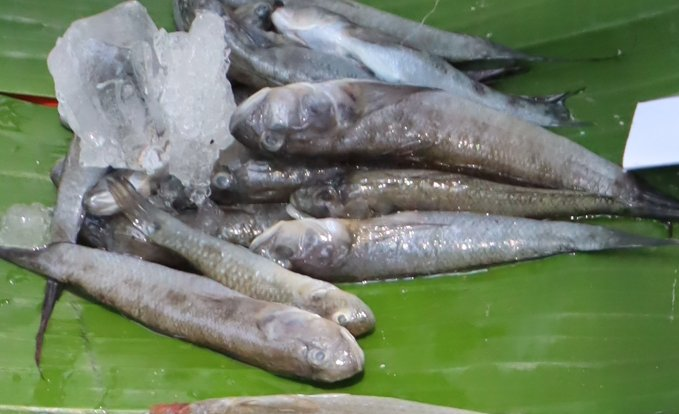
Koozhavali

Koozhavali (or Koozhali) is a fish endemic to the Ashtamudi Lake system located in the Kollam district of Kerala. A special type of net called a 'koozhali net' is used by fishermen to catch it.

Koozhavali are specialized benthic fish that inhabit the soft mud, silt, and sandy substrates of estuarine environments. A study published in Zootaxa by researchers from the University of Kerala and KUFOS has corrected a long-standing misidentification in Ashtamudi Lake's "koozhavali" fishery, revealing it is primarily composed of Oxyurichthys ophthalmonema rather than Oxyurichthys tentacularis. ‘Koozhavali' fishery in Ashtamudi Lake consists of multiple species. The dominant species in the fishery is the eyebrow goby (Oxyurichthys ophthalmonema) then the arrowfin goby (Oxyurichthys tentacularis).
