= O. microlepis =

O. microlepis may refer to:

- Ophisops microlepis
- Opsaridium microlepis
- Oxyurichthys microlepis
- Oxyurichthyes microlepis
