= G. longicauda =

G. longicauda may refer to:

- Glyptothorax longicauda
- Gobius longicauda
