= Oxyurichthys petersii =

Conservation status
- Least Concern (IUCN 3.1)

Scientific classification
- Kingdom: Animalia
- Phylum: Chordata
- Class: Actinopterygii
- Order: Gobiiformes
- Family: Oxudercidae
- Genus: Oxyurichthys
- Species: O. petersii

Binomial name
- Oxyurichthys petersii (Klunzinger, 1871)

Synonyms
- Apocryptes petersii Klunzinger, 1871; Oxyurichthys petersi (Klunzinger, 1871)

Species of fish

Oxyurichthys petersii, commonly known as Peters' goby, is a species of ray-finned fish, a goby, from the family Oxudercidae. It is native to the Red Sea, and has now colonised the eastern Mediterranean Sea by Lessepsian migration through the Suez Canal.

== Taxonomy ==
Oxyurichthys petersii was first formally described in 1871 as Apocryptes petersii by the German zoologist Carl Benjamin Klunzinger with the type locality given as Al-Qusair in the Red Sea Governorate of Egypt. The specific name honours the German naturalist and explorer Wilhelm Peters (1815-1883) who was a curator at the Berlin Zoological Museum and who allowed the author of this species liberal access to the museum's collection.

== Description ==
Oxyurichthys petersii is grey-blue in colour marked with blue spots and streaks on the head and the body. It does not have the vertical bars seen in Oxyurichthys papuensis, with which it has been confused. The caudal fin is reddish with a dark edge and there is a dark spot on the caudal peduncle. The pelvic fins are bluish marked with yellow spots and lines and the pectoral fins are yellowish in colour with white spots while the dorsal and anal fins are either transparent or have a reddish hue and have blue lines. Caudal fin reddish with dark margin. The ventral surface is whitish. The first dorsal fin is low with the tips of the spines extending beyond the membrane and these may be longer in males than in females.

== Distribution ==
Oxyurichthys petersii was endemic to the Red Sea, and was first recorded in the Mediterranean Sea in 1982 off Ashdod (Israel). It is now caught in large quantities in trawl fisheries in the eastern Basin.

== Habitat and biology ==
Oxyurichthys petersii lives on soft bottoms and is a carnivorous species which has been found to have sand and mud in their intestinal tract which suggest they feed on the bottom. Animals found in samples include foraminiferans, harpactoid copepods, tanaidaceans, amphipods, isopods, ostracods, molluscs and echinoderms. The gonads of fish sampled in August and November off Israel were well developed.
