= G. cristatus =

G. cristatus may refer to:

- Germanodactylus cristatus
- Gobius cristatus
