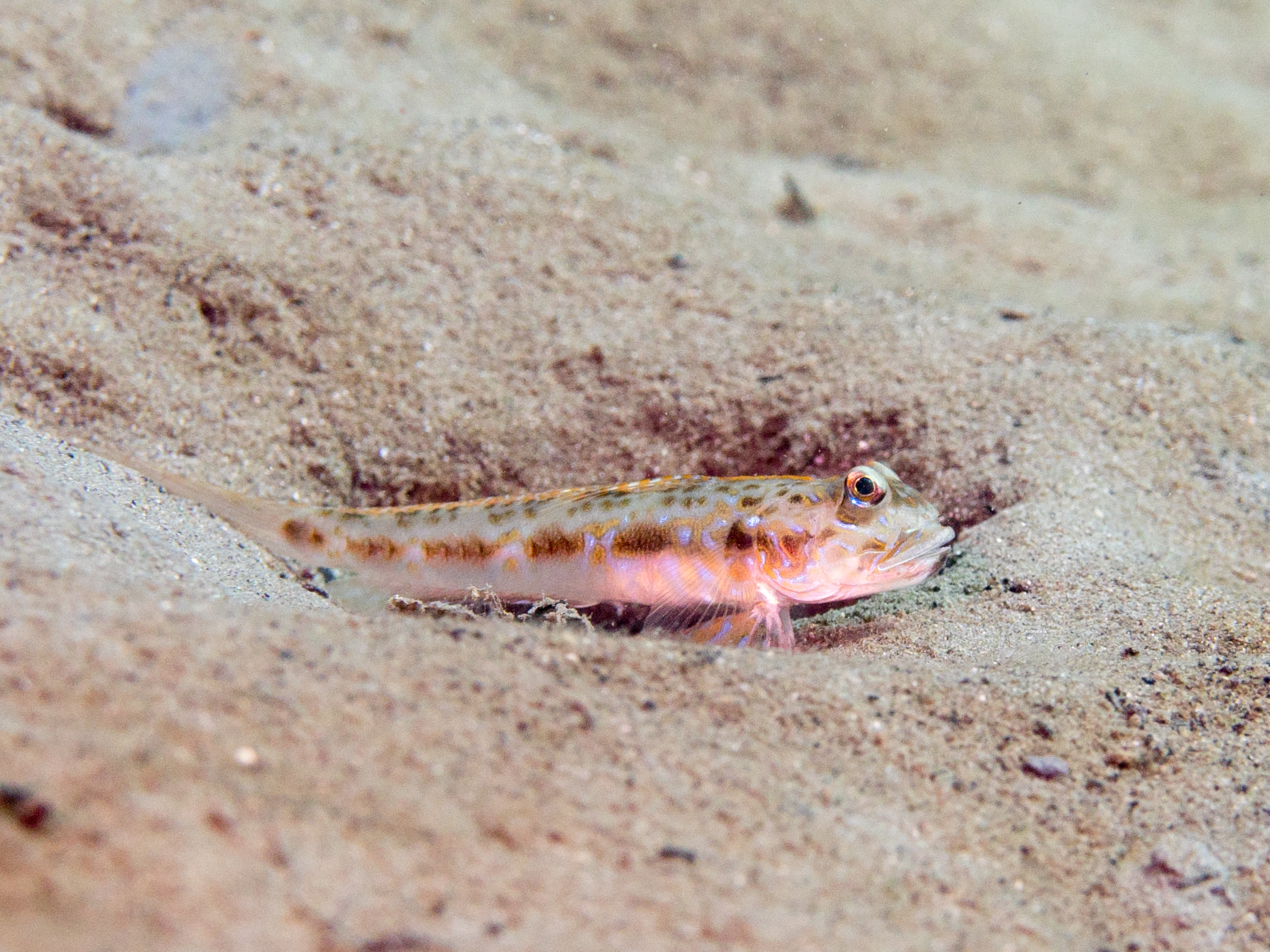

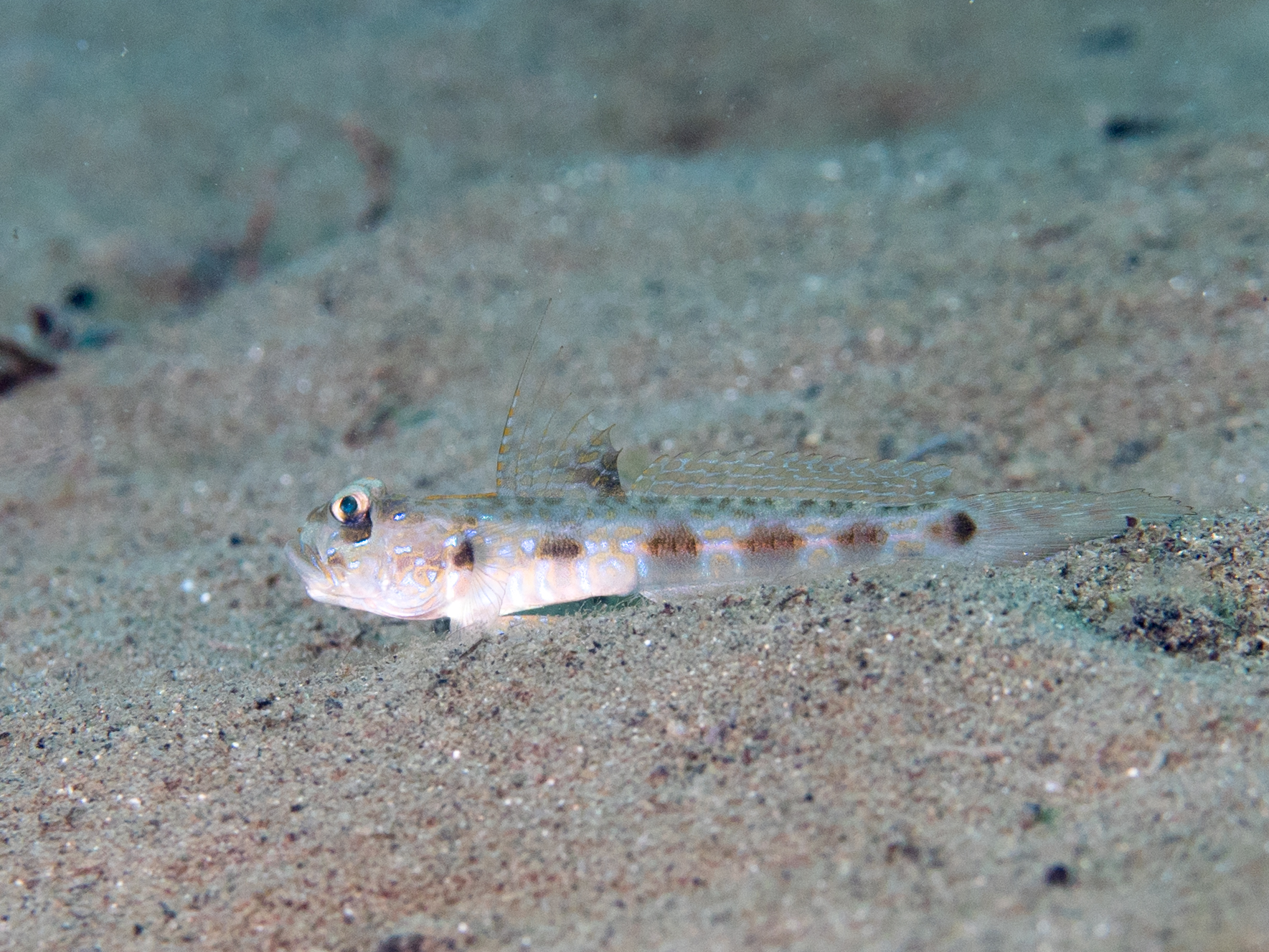

Conservation status
- Least Concern (IUCN 3.1)

Scientific classification
- Kingdom: Animalia
- Phylum: Chordata
- Class: Actinopterygii
- Order: Gobiiformes
- Family: Oxudercidae
- Genus: Oxyurichthys
- Species: O. notonema

Binomial name
- Oxyurichthys notonema (M. C. W. Weber, 1909)

Synonyms
- Gobius notonema Weber, 1909

= Oxyurichthys notonema =

Species of goby

Oxyurichthys notonema, commonly known as the threadfin mudgoby, is a species of goby endemic to the Indo-West Pacific. This species reaches a length of 7.5 cm (3.0 in).
