= Oxyurichthys rapa =

Conservation status
- Data Deficient (IUCN 3.1)

Scientific classification
- Kingdom: Animalia
- Phylum: Chordata
- Class: Actinopterygii
- Order: Gobiiformes
- Family: Oxudercidae
- Genus: Oxyurichthys
- Species: O. rapa

Binomial name
- Oxyurichthys rapa Pezold & Larson, 2015

Species of fish

Oxyurichthys rapa is a species of goby found in the Eastern Pacific: Rapa (French Polynesia). This species reaches a length of 5.7 cm (2.2 in).
