= Mioglareola =

Mioglareola Temporal range: Miocene

Scientific classification
- Kingdom: Animalia
- Phylum: Chordata
- Class: Aves
- Order: Charadriiformes
- Family: Glareolidae
- Genus: †Mioglareola; Mayr & Smith, 2001

Type species
- †Mioglareola gregaria Ballmann, 1979

Other species
- †Mioglareola dolnicensis (Švec, 1980)

Extinct genus of birds

Mioglareola is an extinct genus of glareolid shorebird (order Charadriiformes) that lived during the Early and Middle Miocene of Europe. The genus contains two species: Mioglareola gregaria, known from the Czech Republic and Germany, and Mioglareola dolnicensis, previously placed in the genus Larus, known from the Czech Republic.
