= Oxyurichthys viridis =

Scientific classification
- Domain: Eukaryota
- Kingdom: Animalia
- Phylum: Chordata
- Class: Actinopterygii
- Order: Gobiiformes
- Family: Oxudercidae
- Genus: Oxyurichthys
- Species: O. viridis

Binomial name
- Oxyurichthys viridis Herre, 1927

Species of goby

Oxyurichthys viridis is a species of goby found in the western central Pacific near the Philippines. This species reaches a length of 8.7 cm (3.4 in).
