= Oxyurichthys lemayi =

Scientific classification
- Kingdom: Animalia
- Phylum: Chordata
- Class: Actinopterygii
- Order: Gobiiformes
- Family: Oxudercidae
- Genus: Oxyurichthys
- Species: O. lemayi

Binomial name
- Oxyurichthys lemayi (J. L. B. Smith, 1947)

Synonyms
- Gobiichthys lemayi J. L. B. Smith, 1947

Species of fish

Oxyurichthys lemayi, commonly known as the lace goby, is a species of goby found in the western Indian Ocean (Delagoa Bay, Mozambique). This species reaches a length of 16 cm (6.3 in).
