= Oxyurichthys limophilus =

Conservation status
- Least Concern (IUCN 3.1)

Scientific classification
- Kingdom: Animalia
- Phylum: Chordata
- Class: Actinopterygii
- Order: Gobiiformes
- Family: Oxudercidae
- Genus: Oxyurichthys
- Species: O. limophilus

Binomial name
- Oxyurichthys limophilus Pezold & Larson, 2015

Species of fish

Oxyurichthys limophilus is a species of goby found in the western Indian Ocean off Kenya. This species reaches a length of 9.5 cm (3.7 in).
