= Glareola neogena =

Glareola neogena Temporal range: Middle Miocene

Scientific classification
- Kingdom: Animalia
- Phylum: Chordata
- Class: Aves
- Order: Charadriiformes
- Family: Glareolidae
- Genus: Glareola
- Species: †G. neogena

Binomial name
- †Glareola neogena Ballmann, 1979

Extinct species of bird

Glareola neogena is an extinct species of Glareola that was extant during the Middle Miocene.

== Distribution ==
Glareola neogena fossils are known from Germany.
