= Kei goby =

Conservation status
- Least Concern (IUCN 3.1)

Scientific classification
- Kingdom: Animalia
- Phylum: Chordata
- Class: Actinopterygii
- Order: Gobiiformes
- Family: Oxudercidae
- Genus: Oxyurichthys
- Species: O. keiensis

Binomial name
- Oxyurichthys keiensis (J. L. B. Smith, 1938)

Synonyms
- List: Gobius keiensis Smith, 1938; Ctenogobius keiensis (Smith, 1938); Gobionellus keiensis (Smith, 1938); Oligolepis keiensis (Smith, 1938); Ctenogobius acutipennis (non Valenciennes, 1837); Gobius acutipinnis (non Valenciennes, 1837)

Species of fish

The Kei goby (Oxyurichthys keiensis) is a species of goby native to marine and brackish waters along the coasts of Mozambique, South Africa, Madagascar and the Seychelles. This species can reach a length of 7 centimetres (2.8 in) TL.
