= Oxyurichthys visayanus =

Scientific classification
- Domain: Eukaryota
- Kingdom: Animalia
- Phylum: Chordata
- Class: Actinopterygii
- Order: Gobiiformes
- Family: Oxudercidae
- Genus: Oxyurichthys
- Species: O. visayanus

Binomial name
- Oxyurichthys visayanus Herre, 1927

Species of goby

Oxyurichthys visayanus is a species of goby found in the western Pacific from Amami Ōshima to Iriomotejima and the Philippines.
