= Oxyurichthys chinensis =

Conservation status
- Data Deficient (IUCN 3.1)

Scientific classification
- Kingdom: Animalia
- Phylum: Chordata
- Class: Actinopterygii
- Order: Gobiiformes
- Family: Oxudercidae
- Genus: Oxyurichthys
- Species: O. chinensis

Binomial name
- Oxyurichthys chinensis Pezold & Larson, 2015

Species of goby

Oxyurichthys chinensis is a species of goby found in the Northwest Pacific: China. This species reaches a length of 4.4 cm (1.7 in).
