= Oxyurichthys mindanensis =

Scientific classification
- Domain: Eukaryota
- Kingdom: Animalia
- Phylum: Chordata
- Class: Actinopterygii
- Order: Gobiiformes
- Family: Oxudercidae
- Genus: Oxyurichthys
- Species: O. mindanensis

Binomial name
- Oxyurichthys mindanensis (Herre, 1927)

Synonyms
- Parapocryptes mindanensis (Herre, 1927)

Species of fish

Oxyurichthys mindanensis is a species of goby found in the western Pacific (Japan and the Philippines). This species reaches a length of 7.0 cm (2.8 in).
