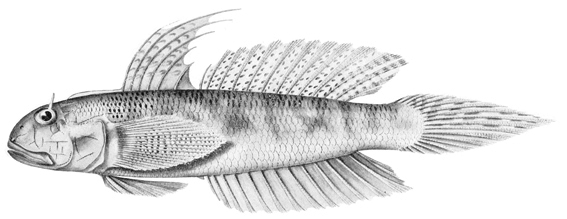
- Oxyurichthys cornutus

Scientific classification
- Kingdom: Animalia
- Phylum: Chordata
- Class: Actinopterygii
- Order: Gobiiformes
- Family: Oxudercidae
- Subfamily: Gobionellinae
- Genus: Oxyurichthys; Bleeker, 1857

Type species
- Gobius belosso Bleeker, 1854

Synonyms
- Gobiichthys Klunzinger, 1871; Paeneapocryptes Herre, 1927; Pselaphias Jordan & Seale, 1906

= Oxyurichthys =

Genus of fishes

Oxyurichthys is a genus of fish in the subfamily Gobionellinae, commonly known as arrowfin gobies. They are distributed in the tropical and subtropical Indian and Pacific Oceans; one species is also known from the western Atlantic Ocean. Most species live in shallow waters under 10 meters deep over fine substrates such as silt.

== Species ==
The following 22 species are recognized in the genus Oxyurichthys:

- Oxyurichthys auchenolepis Bleeker, 1876 (scaly-nape tentacle goby)
- Oxyurichthys chinensis Pezold & Larson, 2015
- Oxyurichthys cornutus McCulloch & Waite, 1918 (horned tentacle goby)
- Oxyurichthys heisei Pezold, 1998
- Oxyurichthys keiensis (J. L. B. Smith, 1938) (Kei goby)
- Oxyurichthys limophilus Pezold & Larson, 2015
- Oxyurichthys lonchotus (O. P. Jenkins, 1903) (speartail mudgoby)
- Oxyurichthys longicauda (Steindachner, 1893)
- Oxyurichthys microlepis (Bleeker, 1849) (maned goby)
- Oxyurichthys notonema (M. C. W. Weber, 1909) (threadfin mudgoby)
- Oxyurichthys nuchalis (Barnard, 1927)
- Oxyurichthys omanensis Zarei, Al Jufaili and Esmaeili, 2022
- Oxyurichthys ophthalmonema (Bleeker, 1856) (eyebrow goby)
- Oxyurichthys papuensis (Valenciennes, 1837) (frogface goby)
- Oxyurichthys paulae Pezold, 1998 (jester goby)
- Oxyurichthys petersii (Klunzinger, 1871)
- Oxyurichthys rapa Pezold & Larson, 2015
- Oxyurichthys saru Tomiyama, 1936
- Oxyurichthys stigmalophius (Mead & J. E. Böhlke, 1958) (spotfin goby)
- Oxyurichthys takagi Pezold, 1998
- Oxyurichthys tentacularis (Valenciennes, 1837)
- Oxyurichthys zeta Pezold & Larson, 2015

Synonyms

- Oxyurichthys guibei J. L. B. Smith, 1959; valid as O. lonchotus
- Oxyurichthys lemayi (J. L. B. Smith, 1947); valid as O. notonema (lace goby)
- Oxyurichthys mindanensis (Herre, 1927); valid as O. notonema
- Oxyurichthys uronema (M. C. W. Weber, 1909); valid as O. longicauda (longtail tentacle goby)
- Oxyurichthys viridis Herre, 1927; valid as O. ophthalmonema
- Oxyurichthys visayanus Herre, 1927; valid as O. lonchotus
