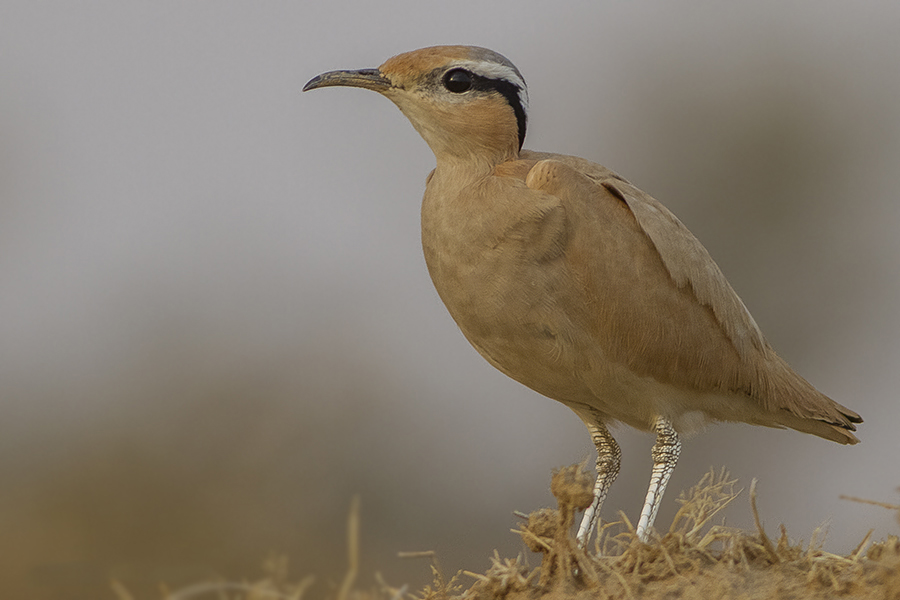
- Cream-coloured courser (Cursorius cursor)

Scientific classification
- Kingdom: Animalia
- Phylum: Chordata
- Class: Aves
- Order: Charadriiformes
- Family: Glareolidae
- Subfamily: Cursoriinae

Genera
- Cursorius; Rhinoptilus; Smutsornis

= Courser =

Subfamily of birds

The coursers are a subfamily Cursoriinae of birds which, together with the pratincoles, make up the family Glareolidae in the order Charadriiformes. They have, compared to pratincoles, longer legs, shorter wings and longer pointed bills which curve downwards. They inhabit deserts and similar arid regions, and have cryptic plumage and crouch down when alarmed to avoid detection by predators.

Like the pratincoles, the coursers are found in warmer parts of the Old World. They hunt insects by running.

Their 2–3 eggs are laid on the ground.

== Taxonomy ==
Although traditionally thought to be waders, particularly closely related to plovers, genetic studies now classify the coursers and pratincoles in the suborder Lari, more closely related to gulls and terns, and closest of all to the crab-plover.

=== Species ===
Nine species in three genera are accepted:

- Genus Cursorius
  - Indian courser Cursorius coromandelicus
  - Temminck's courser Cursorius temminckii
  - Burchell's courser Cursorius rufus
  - Cream-coloured courser Cursorius cursor
  - Somali courser Cursorius somalensis
- Genus Rhinoptilus
  - Bronze-winged courser or violet-tipped courser Rhinoptilus chalcopterus
  - Three-banded courser or Heuglin's courser Rhinoptilus cinctus
  - Jerdon's courser Rhinoptilus bitorquatus
- Genus Smutsornis (monotypic genus)
  - Double-banded courser or two-banded courser Smutsornis africanus (syn. Rhinoptilus africanus)
