= Oxyurichthys auchenolepis =

Conservation status
- Least Concern (IUCN 3.1)

Scientific classification
- Kingdom: Animalia
- Phylum: Chordata
- Class: Actinopterygii
- Order: Gobiiformes
- Family: Oxudercidae
- Genus: Oxyurichthys
- Species: O. auchenolepis

Binomial name
- Oxyurichthys auchenolepis Bleeker, 1876

Synonyms
- Gobius petersenii Steindachner, 1893; Oxyurichthys amabalis Seale, 1914; Oxyurichthys petersenii (Steindachner, 1893)

Species of goby

Oxyurichthys auchenolepis, commonly known as the scaly-nape tentacle goby, is a species of goby found in the western central Pacific (China, Japan, Philippines, Thailand, Singapore, Indonesia, northern Australia). This species reaches a length of 13 cm (5.1 in).
