= Oxyurichthys takagi =

Conservation status
- Least Concern (IUCN 3.1)

Scientific classification
- Kingdom: Animalia
- Phylum: Chordata
- Class: Actinopterygii
- Order: Gobiiformes
- Family: Oxudercidae
- Genus: Oxyurichthys
- Species: O. takagi

Binomial name
- Oxyurichthys takagi Pezold, 1998

Species of fish

Oxyurichthys takagi is a species of goby is found in the Western Pacific: known only from Palau. This species reaches a length of 6.4 cm (2.5 in).

== Etymology ==
The fish is named in honor of Kazunori Takagi, of the Tokyo University of Fisheries, whose studies of gobioid oculoscapular canals showed their significance to gobioid systematics.
