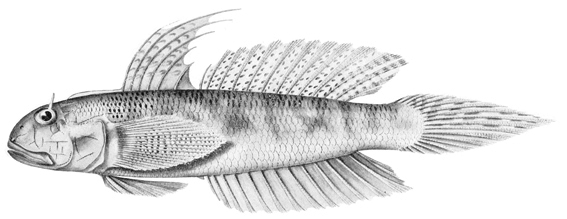

Conservation status
- Least Concern (IUCN 3.1)

Scientific classification
- Kingdom: Animalia
- Phylum: Chordata
- Class: Actinopterygii
- Order: Gobiiformes
- Family: Oxudercidae
- Genus: Oxyurichthys
- Species: O. cornutus

Binomial name
- Oxyurichthys cornutus McCulloch & Waite, 1918

= Oxyurichthys cornutus =

Species of fish

Oxyurichthys cornutus, commonly known as the horned tentacle goby, is a species of goby is found in Fiji, Australia, Papua New Guinea, Indonesia, Philippines, Japan, Palau, Solomon Islands, Samoa.
