= Oxyurichthys uronema =

Scientific classification
- Domain: Eukaryota
- Kingdom: Animalia
- Phylum: Chordata
- Class: Actinopterygii
- Order: Gobiiformes
- Family: Oxudercidae
- Genus: Oxyurichthys
- Species: O. uronema

Binomial name
- Oxyurichthys uronema (M. C. W. Weber, 1909)

Synonyms
- Gobius uronema M. C. W. Weber, 1909

Species of goby

Oxyurichthys uronema, commonly known as the longtail tentacle goby, is a species of goby found in Indonesia.
