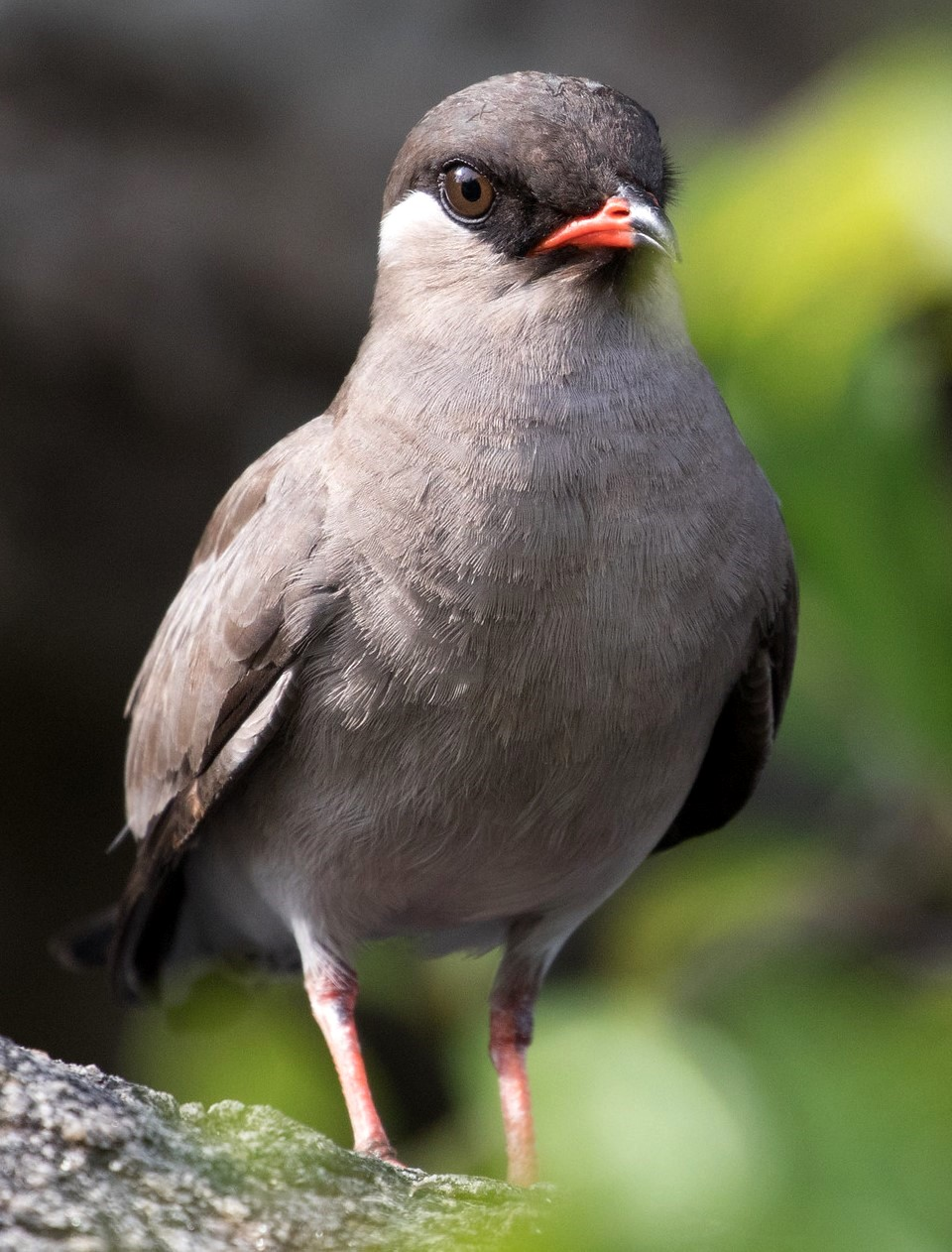
- Nominate subspecies at Murchison Falls National Park in Uganda

Conservation status
- Least Concern (IUCN 3.1)

Scientific classification
- Kingdom: Animalia
- Phylum: Chordata
- Class: Aves
- Order: Charadriiformes
- Family: Glareolidae
- Genus: Glareola
- Species: G. nuchalis

Binomial name
- Glareola nuchalis Gray, 1849
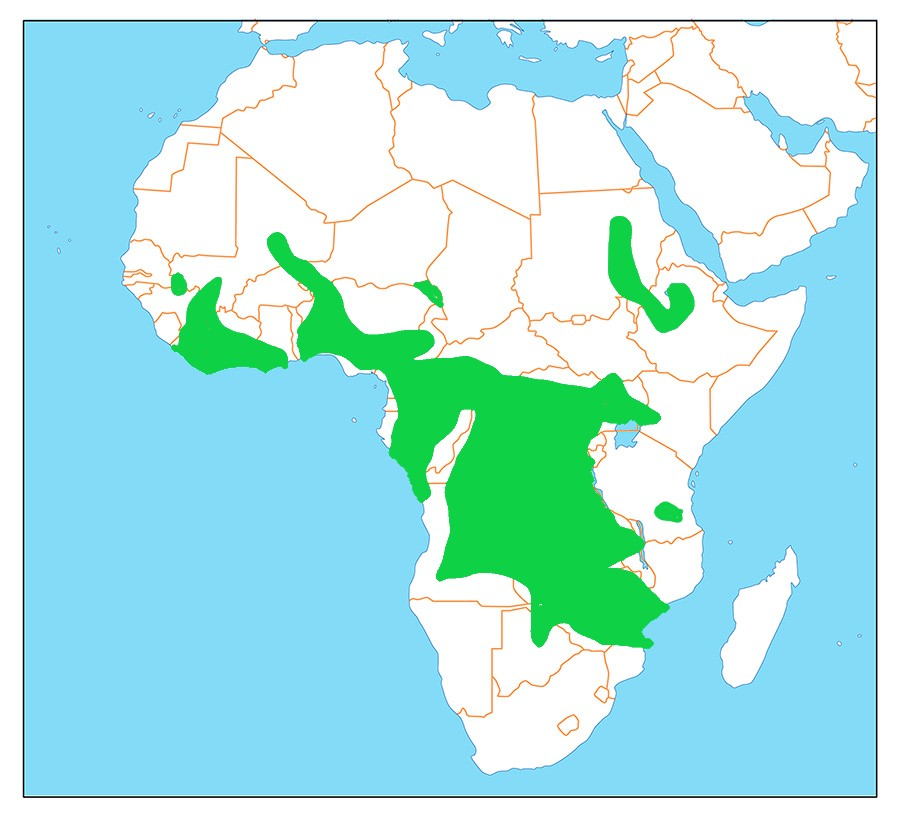
- native range

Synonyms
- Galactochrysea liberiae; Galactochrysea emini

= Rock pratincole =

Species of bird

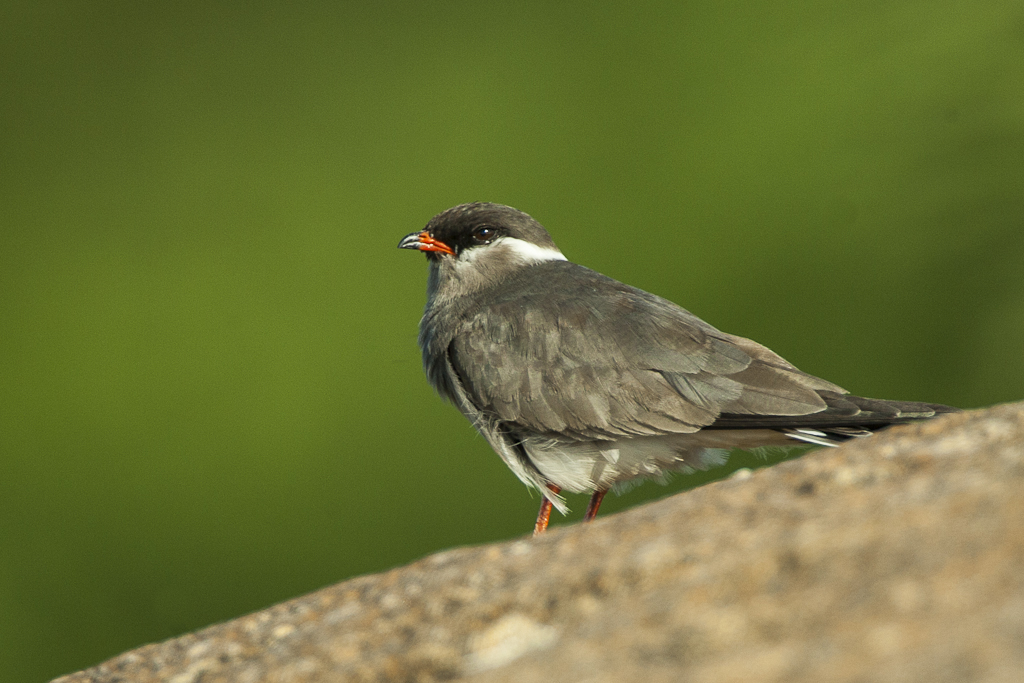
Rock pratincole in Kenya

The rock pratincole (Glareola nuchalis) is a species of bird in the family Glareolidae.

== Distribution and habitat ==
There are two subspecies of rock pratincole:

- G. n. liberiae (Schlegel, 1881), – rufous-collared pratincole – from Sierra Leone to western Cameroon
- G. n. nuchalis (Gray, 1849), – white-collared pratincole – Chad to Ethiopia, south to southern Angola & northeast Namibia to western Zambia & Mozambique

== Identification ==
The rock pratincole (Glareola nuchalis) is a native African wading bird. Mature adults have dark gray or brown plumage with a white line beginning beneath the eye extending to the back of the neck like a collar. Their wings are long and dark with a distinct white patch on the underwing. Their tail is forked and they usually have a white belly. The bill is black with a red base and the legs and eyes are coral red. Both sexes emit a faint whistling contact call and musical purring but can become very noisy when aggressive. Glareola nuchalis measurements: length: 16.5–19.5 cm; wing: 14.3–16.0 cm; bill: 10-12 mm; tail: 5–6 cm; mass: 43–52 grams.

== Habitat ==
Glareola nuchalis associates with the rocks along the embankments of rivers and lakes as its seasonal movements are determined by local water levels. These intra-African migrants occur peripherally along the coast of South Africa in the equatorial regions. They migrate when areas are flooded and arrive when rocks emanate during drought. They live in flocks of about 26 pairs in and on the rocks feeding upon insects in the morning and evening and wading in the cool waters during the heat of the day. They will feed during day if overcast is present and can be routinely seen perched on a hippopotamus scavenging for insects. Its diet consists mostly of flies, moths, ants, beetles, grasshoppers and cicadas. Their prey is attacked aerially.

== Breeding ==
An elaborate courtship occurs in flight with wings held high over the back with neck feathers flared to emphasize their collar. They are monogamous and keep the same mate for life. Breeding pairs withdraw from the flock and become territorial of their nest and only breed in times of drought. The female lays 1–2 eggs in the depression of a smooth rock in sites surrounded by water. Both sexes incubate the nest and frequently return to the nest with wet feathers to keep their eggs cool. Chicks are born camouflaged with brown feathers and white spots and have no white collar until it matures. They quickly take refuge in the crevices of rocks and begin swimming well quickly.
