= Oxyurichthys heisei =

Scientific classification
- Domain: Eukaryota
- Kingdom: Animalia
- Phylum: Chordata
- Class: Actinopterygii
- Order: Gobiiformes
- Family: Oxudercidae
- Genus: Oxyurichthys
- Species: O. heisei

Binomial name
- Oxyurichthys heisei Pezold, 1998

Species of fish

Oxyurichthys heisei, commonly known as the ribbon goby, is a species of goby is found in the eastern central Pacific (Hawaii). This species reaches a length of 6.4 cm (2.5 in).
