= Oxyurichthys guibei =

Scientific classification
- Kingdom: Animalia
- Phylum: Chordata
- Class: Actinopterygii
- Order: Gobiiformes
- Family: Oxudercidae
- Genus: Oxyurichthys
- Species: O. guibei

Binomial name
- Oxyurichthys guibei J. L. B. Smith, 1959

Synonyms
- Cryptopterus filifer (non Valenciennes, 1837); Gobius filifer (non Valenciennes, 1837)

Species of fish

Oxyurichthys guibei is a species of goby endemic to Reunion Island in the western Indian Ocean. This species reaches a length of 13 cm (5.1 in).
