= Oxyurichthys zeta =

Conservation status
- Least Concern (IUCN 3.1)

Scientific classification
- Kingdom: Animalia
- Phylum: Chordata
- Class: Actinopterygii
- Order: Gobiiformes
- Family: Oxudercidae
- Genus: Oxyurichthys
- Species: O. zeta

Binomial name
- Oxyurichthys zeta Pezold & Larson, 2015

Species of fish

Oxyurichthys zeta is a species of goby. It is found in the Pacific Ocean from Japan, Palau, Indonesia, Papua New Guinea and the Solomon Islands. This species reaches a length of 4.9 cm (1.9 in).
