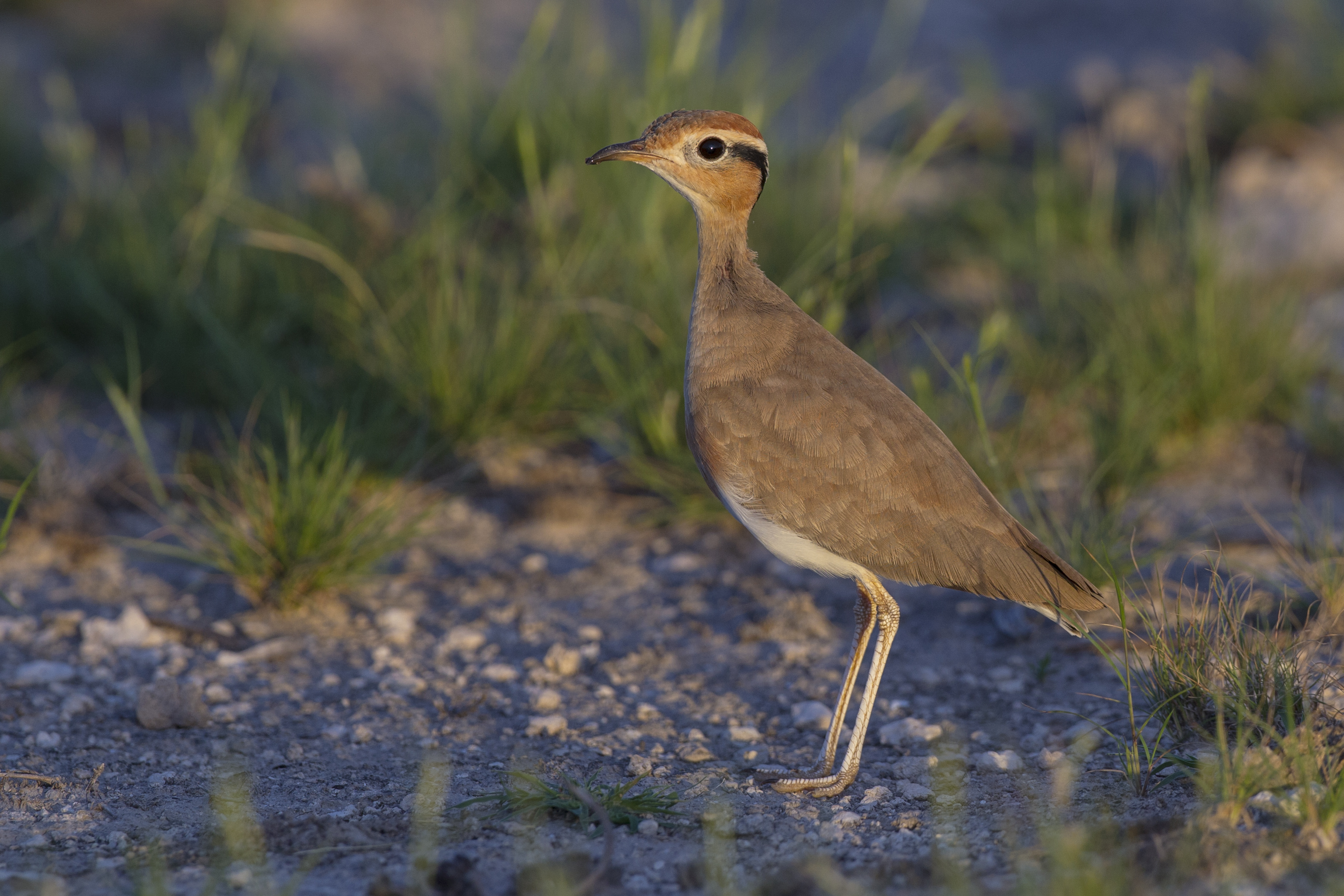
- Burchell's courser (Cursorius rufus)

Scientific classification
- Kingdom: Animalia
- Phylum: Chordata
- Class: Aves
- Order: Charadriiformes
- Family: Glareolidae
- Subfamily: Cursoriinae
- Genus: Cursorius; Latham, 1790

Type species
- Cursorius europaeus = Charadrius cursor Latham, 1790

Species
- C. cursor C. somalensis C. rufus C. temminckii C. coromandelicus

= Cursorius =

Genus of birds

Cursorius is a genus of coursers, a group of birds in the pratincole family Glareolidae, in the order Charadriiformes. The genus name derive from Latin cursor meaning "runner".

There are five species which breed in Africa and South Asia. They have, compared to pratincoles, longer legs, shorter wings and longer pointed bills which curve downwards. They inhabit deserts and similar arid regions. Like the related pratincoles, the coursers are found in warmer parts of the Old World. They hunt insects by sight, pursuing them on foot.

Their 2–3 eggs are laid on the ground.

== Taxonomy ==
Although traditionally thought to be waders, particularly closely related to plovers, genetic studies now classify the coursers and pratincoles in the suborder Lari, more closely related to gulls and terns, and closest of all to the crab-plover.

The genus Cursorius was introduced in 1790 by the English ornithologist John Latham. The type species was subsequently designated as the cream-coloured courser. The genus name is derive from Latin cursor meaning "runner", from currere, "to run".

The genus contains five species:

- Cream-coloured courser (Cursorius cursor)
- Somali courser (Cursorius somalensis)
- Burchell's courser (Cursorius rufus)
- Temminck's courser (Cursorius temminckii)
- Indian courser (Cursorius coromandelicus)
