= Oxyurichthys stigmalophius =

Conservation status
- Least Concern (IUCN 3.1)

Scientific classification
- Kingdom: Animalia
- Phylum: Chordata
- Class: Actinopterygii
- Order: Gobiiformes
- Family: Oxudercidae
- Genus: Oxyurichthys
- Species: O. stigmalophius

Binomial name
- Oxyurichthys stigmalophius (Mead & J. E. Böhlke 1958)

Synonyms
- Gobionellus stigmalophius Mead & J. E. Böhlke, 1958; Ctenogobius stigmalophius (Mead & Böhlke, 1958)

Species of fish

Oxyurichthys stigmalophius, commonly known as the spotfin goby, is a species of goby found in the western central Atlantic (Florida, Bahamas and the southern Gulf of Mexico to Suriname). This species reaches a length of 16.5 cm (6.5 in).
