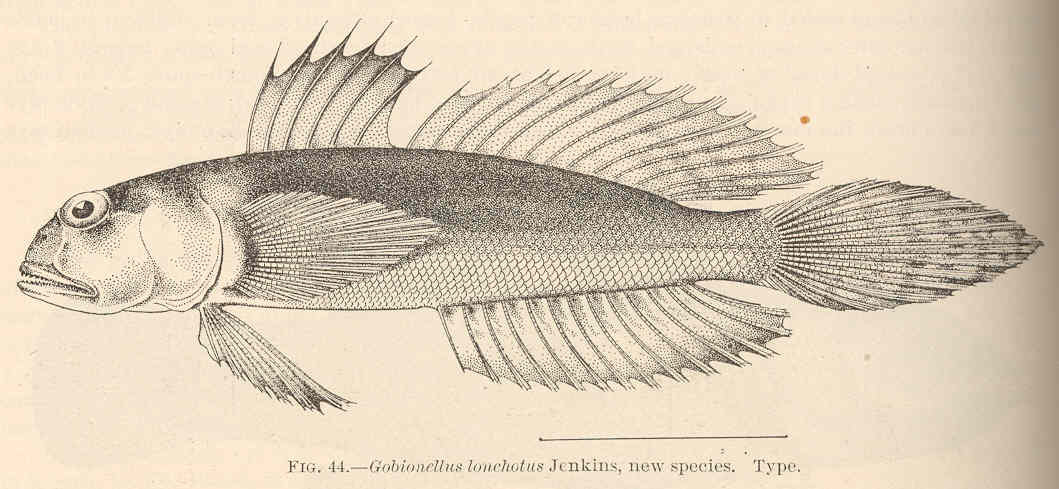

Conservation status
- Least Concern (IUCN 3.1)

Scientific classification
- Kingdom: Animalia
- Phylum: Chordata
- Class: Actinopterygii
- Division: Teleostei
- Order: Gobiiformes
- Family: Oxudercidae
- Genus: Oxyurichthys
- Species: O. lonchotus

Binomial name
- Oxyurichthys lonchotus (O. P. Jenkins, 1903)

Synonyms
- Gobionellus lonchotus Jenkins, 1903

= Oxyurichthys lonchotus =

Species of goby

Oxyurichthys lonchotus, commonly known as the speartail mudgoby, is a species of goby found in Hawaii and Indonesia. This species reaches a length of 4.7 cm (1.9 in).
