= Oxyurichthys paulae =

Conservation status
- Data Deficient (IUCN 3.1)

Scientific classification
- Kingdom: Animalia
- Phylum: Chordata
- Class: Actinopterygii
- Order: Gobiiformes
- Family: Oxudercidae
- Genus: Oxyurichthys
- Species: O. paulae

Binomial name
- Oxyurichthys paulae Pezold, 1998

Species of fish

Oxyurichthys paulae, commonly known as the jester goby, is a species of goby known only from Cochin, India. This species reaches a length of 6.8 cm (2.7 in).
