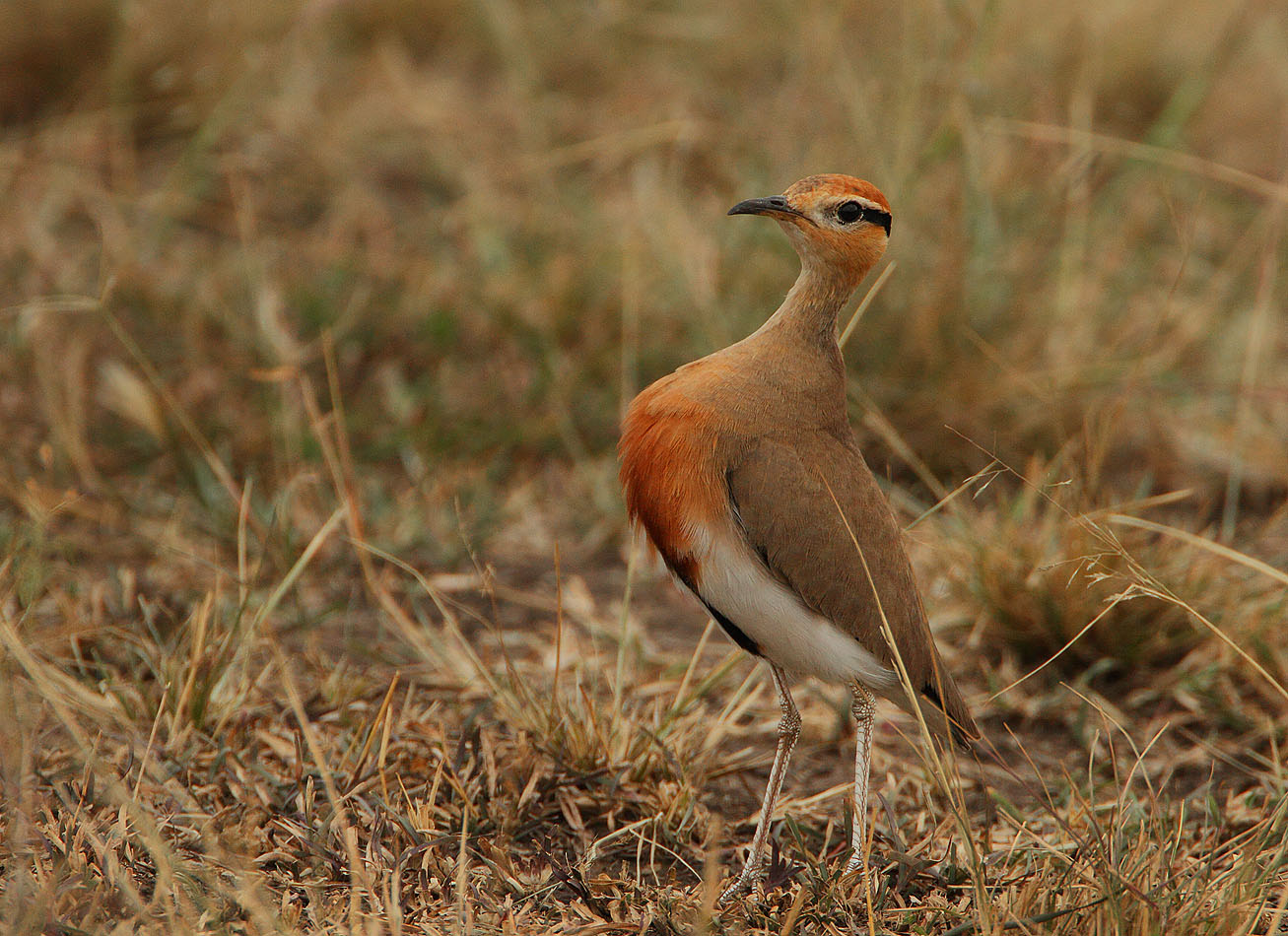

Conservation status
- Least Concern (IUCN 3.1)

Scientific classification
- Kingdom: Animalia
- Phylum: Chordata
- Class: Aves
- Order: Charadriiformes
- Family: Glareolidae
- Genus: Cursorius
- Species: C. temminckii

Binomial name
- Cursorius temminckii Swainson, 1822

= Temminck's courser =

Species of bird

Temminck's courser (Cursorius temminckii) is a bird in the pratincole and courser family, Glareolidae. It is a wader which lives in sub-Saharan Africa. It is noted for laying its dark ash-black eggs in the burnt bushes and grass of the African savannah.

== Subspecies ==
There are three subspecies of Temminck's courser:

- C. t. temminckii, (Swainson, 1822): Senegal to Ethiopia, Kenya and northern Tanzania
- C. t. ruvanensis, (Madarász, 1915): southern Tanzania to Angola, Mozambique & northeast South Africa
- C. t. aridus, (Clancey, 1989): northern Namibia to western Zimbabwe

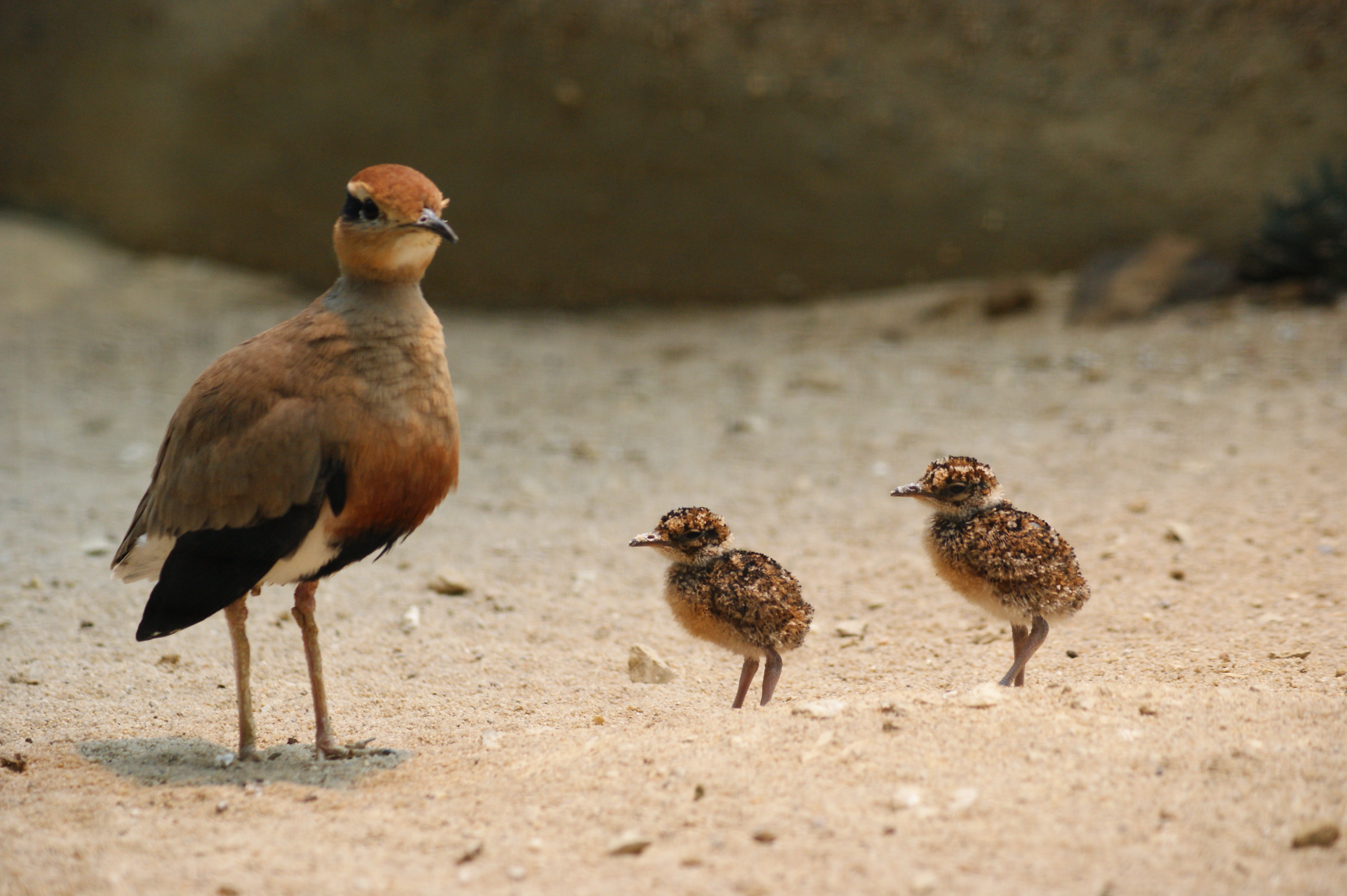

This bird's common name and Latin binomial commemorate the Dutch naturalist Coenraad Jacob Temminck.
