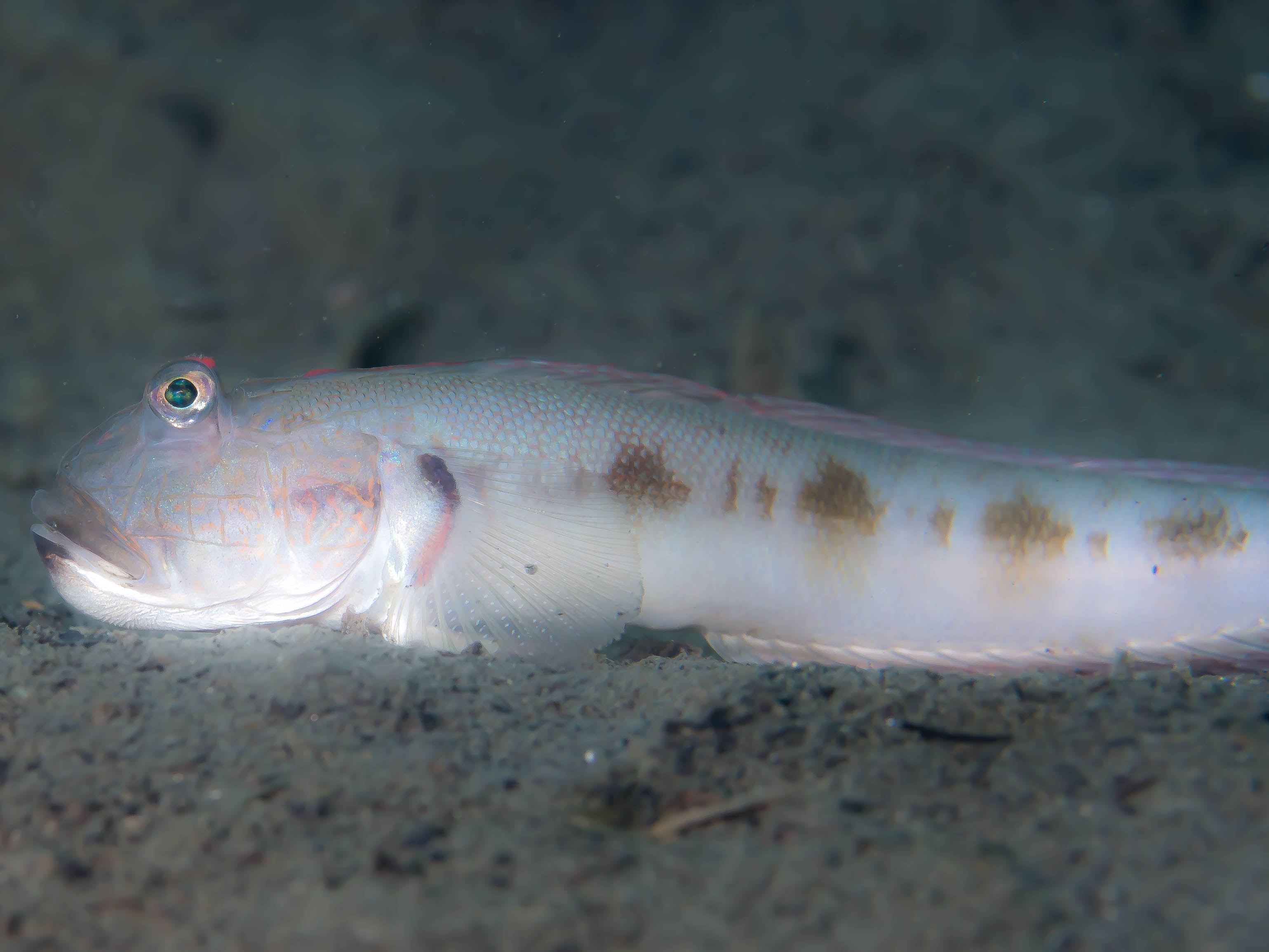

Conservation status
- Least Concern (IUCN 3.1)

Scientific classification
- Kingdom: Animalia
- Phylum: Chordata
- Class: Actinopterygii
- Order: Gobiiformes
- Family: Oxudercidae
- Genus: Oxyurichthys
- Species: O. papuensis

Binomial name
- Oxyurichthys papuensis (Valenciennes, 1837)

Synonyms
- Gobius papuensis Valenciennes, 1837; Gobius belosso Bleeker, 1854; Oxyurichthys oculomirus Herre, 1927

= Oxyurichthys papuensis =

Species of goby

Oxyurichthys papuensis, commonly known as the frogface goby, is a species of goby found in the Indo-West Pacific, the Red Sea south to Natal, South Africa and east to the tropical western Pacific. This species reaches a length of 20 cm (7.9 in).
