= Oxyurichthys ophthalmonema =

Conservation status
- Least Concern (IUCN 3.1)

Scientific classification
- Kingdom: Animalia
- Phylum: Chordata
- Class: Actinopterygii
- Order: Gobiiformes
- Family: Oxudercidae
- Genus: Oxyurichthys
- Species: O. ophthalmonema

Binomial name
- Oxyurichthys ophthalmonema (Bleeker, 1856)

Synonyms
- Gobius ophthalmonema Bleeker, 1856; Euctenogobius andamanensis Day, 1871; Oxyurichthys talwari Mehta, Rema Devi & Mehta, 1989; Oxyurichthys viridis Herre, 1927; Oxyurichthys tentacularis (non Valenciennes, 1837)

Species of fish

Oxyurichthys ophthalmonema, the eyebrow goby, is a species of goby is found in the Indo-West Pacific and western central Pacific. This species reaches a length of 18 cm (7.1 in).
