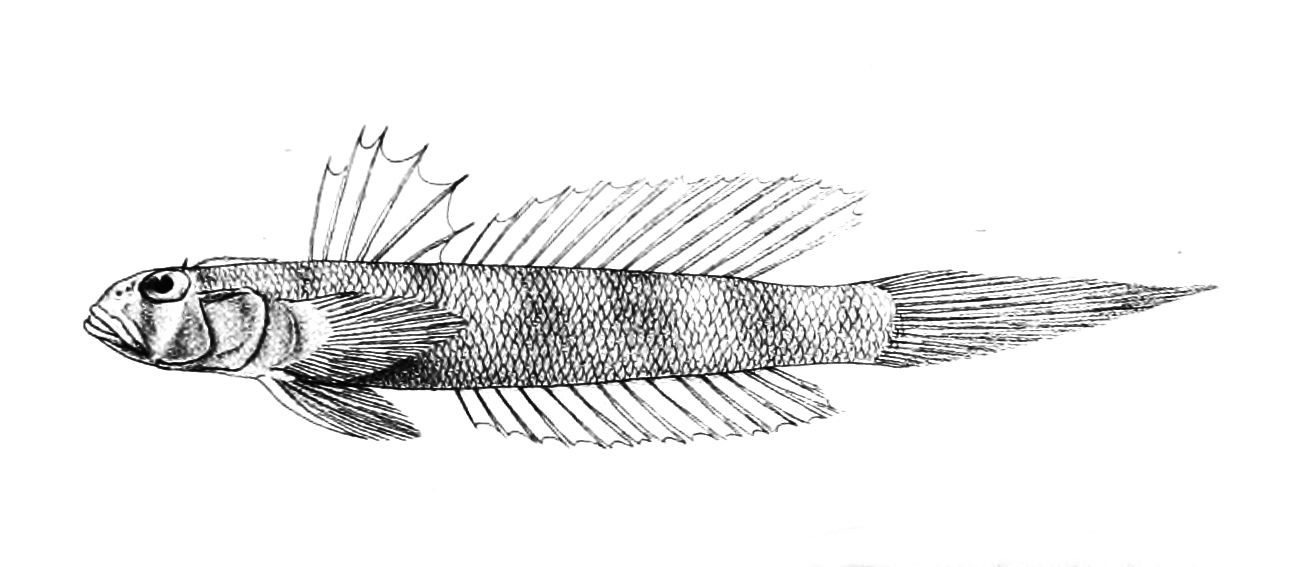

Conservation status
- Data Deficient (IUCN 3.1)

Scientific classification
- Kingdom: Animalia
- Phylum: Chordata
- Class: Actinopterygii
- Order: Gobiiformes
- Family: Oxudercidae
- Genus: Oxyurichthys
- Species: O. tentacularis

Binomial name
- Oxyurichthys tentacularis (Valenciennes, 1837)

Synonyms
- Gobius tentacularis Valenciennes, 1837

= Oxyurichthys tentacularis =

Species of goby

Oxyurichthys tentacularis is a species of goby found in the Indo-West Pacific from the Transkei northwards, Zanzibar, and Madagascar to the tropical West Pacific. This species reaches a length of 17.0 cm (6.7 in).
