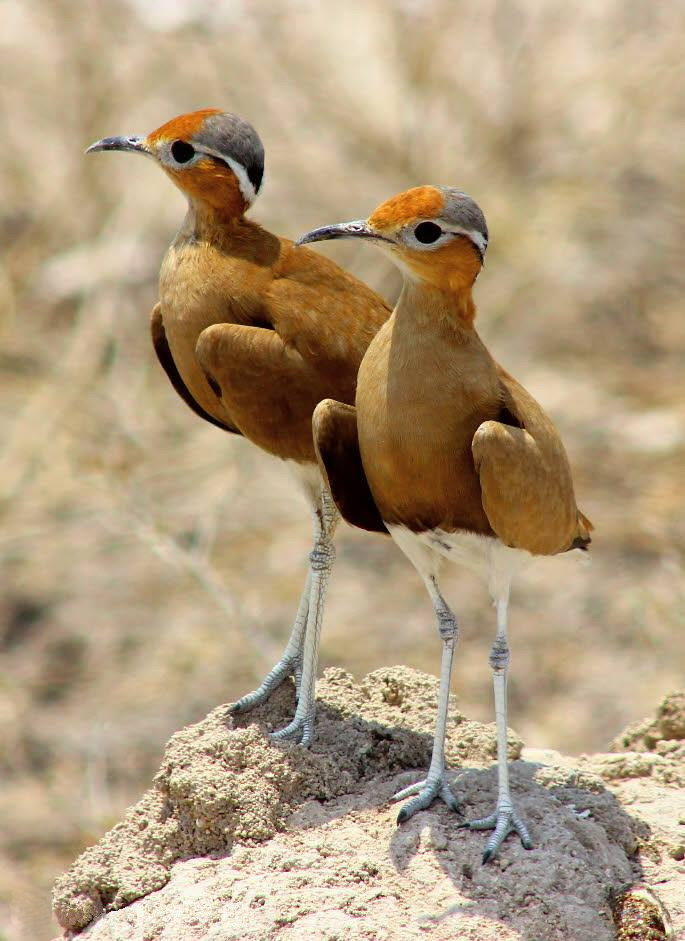
- C. rufus pair in Namibia

Conservation status
- Least Concern (IUCN 3.1)

Scientific classification
- Kingdom: Animalia
- Phylum: Chordata
- Class: Aves
- Order: Charadriiformes
- Family: Glareolidae
- Genus: Cursorius
- Species: C. rufus

Binomial name
- Cursorius rufus Gould, 1837
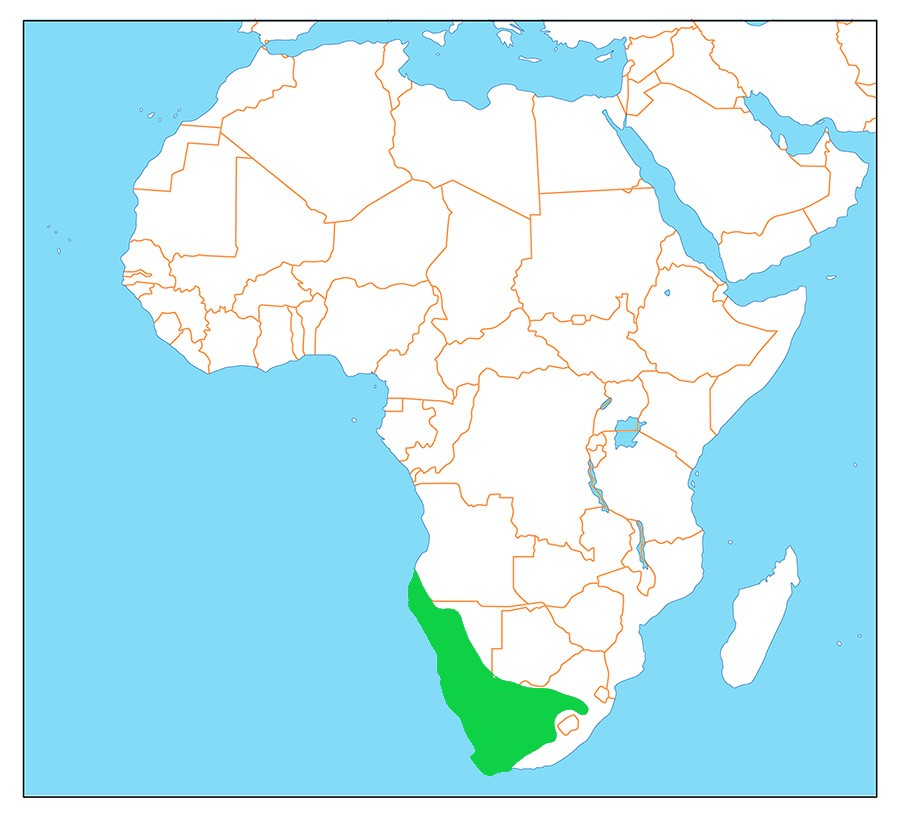

= Burchell's courser =

Species of bird

Burchell's courser (Cursorius rufus) is a wader in the pratincole and courser family, Glareolidae. The name of this bird commemorates the English naturalist William John Burchell.

Native to Africa, Burchell's courser is a small, diurnal, and terrestrial bird that lives in the western parts of southern Africa. Although classed as waders, these are birds of dry open country, preferably semi-desert, where they typically hunt their insect prey (usually Harvester Termites) by running on the ground. It principally feeds off of insects and lives in open, short grasslands and burnt veld. It grows up to 22 cm (8.7 in) and on average weighs about 75 g (2.6 oz) as an adult.

== Description ==
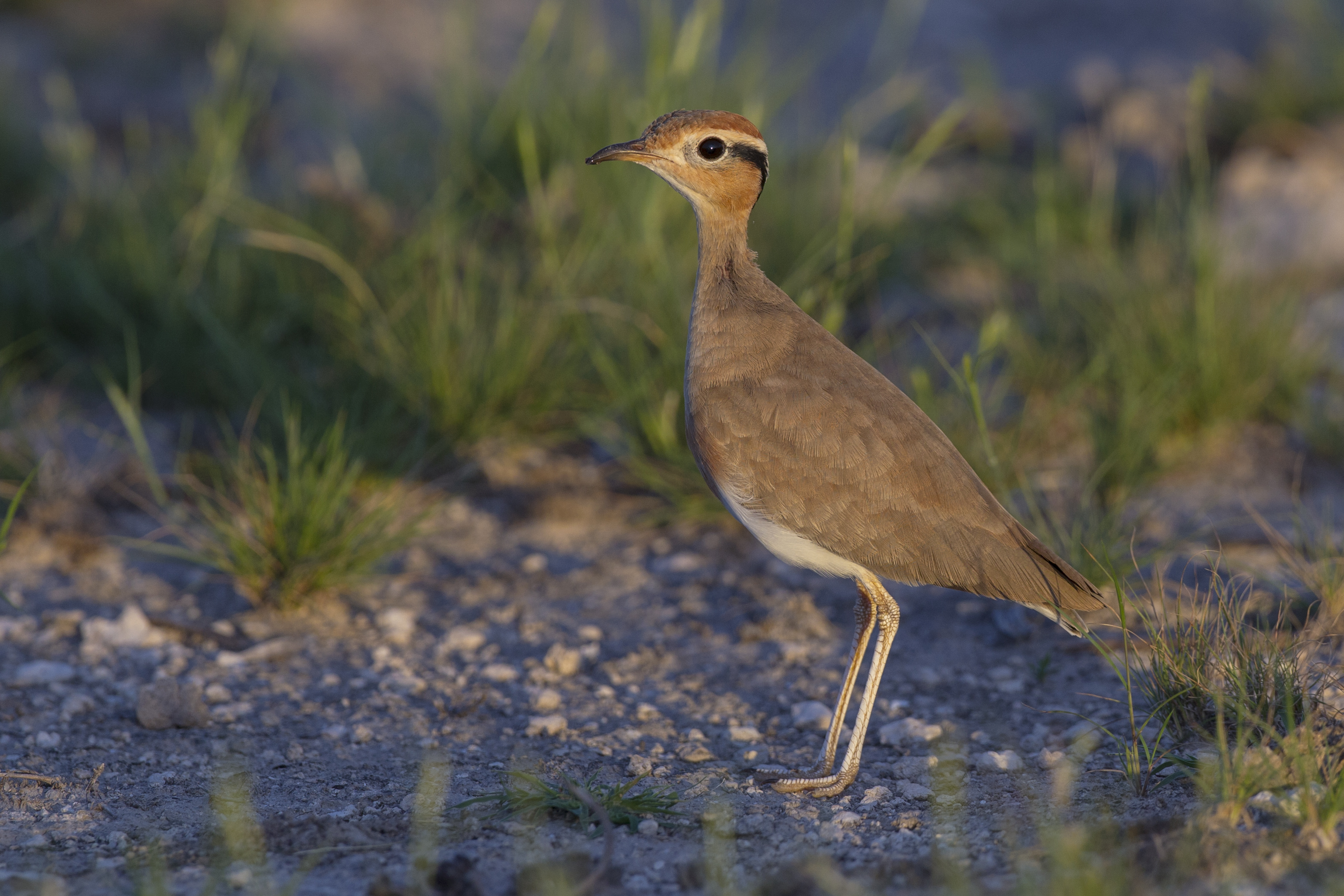
Close-up of C. rufus

Burchell's courser has a graceful figure and an upright posture. It has a blue-grey hind crown which is mainly how it differs from the similar Temminck's courser. It also has a horizontal black band demarcating a white underbelly, and an overall pale rufous colour. Its face features white supercilia above black eye lines, all ending at the back of the neck to form a double V. In terms of feathers, its secondaries are mostly white with a black underwing and brown to grey coverts. Typical of coursers, its bill is long, arched down, and of a dark colour like its eyes. Similar to the underbelly, the legs are of a distinctive creamy white. While flying, the Burchell's courser's feet extend past its tail.

Females and males look similar, while juveniles lack the rufous colouring, the facial stripes, and the grey hind crown of the adults. They also are mottled, with black and beige barring. Overall, the Burchell's courser, with its camouflage appearance, blends in with the landscape making it challenging to spot.

Biometrics
	Measurements (mm)
height	200-225
bill	19-24
wing	123-145
tail	45-53
tarsus	43-58

== Taxonomy ==
Burchell's courser belongs to the order Charadriiformes which mainly refers to birds living near water. Characterized by a curved beak and nostrils located at the base of the nose, the Burchell's courser is part of the Glareolidae family, specifically belonging to the courser group. Its genus, Cursorius, contains five species, all of which live in the arid parts of the Old World and display distinctive features such as long legs and short wings.

Burchell's courser and its close relative, C. cursor, have at times been referred to as the same species. However, although they have a direct common ancestor, they should not be considered as such. C. rufus is monotypic and does not have any subspecies.

== Distribution and habitat ==
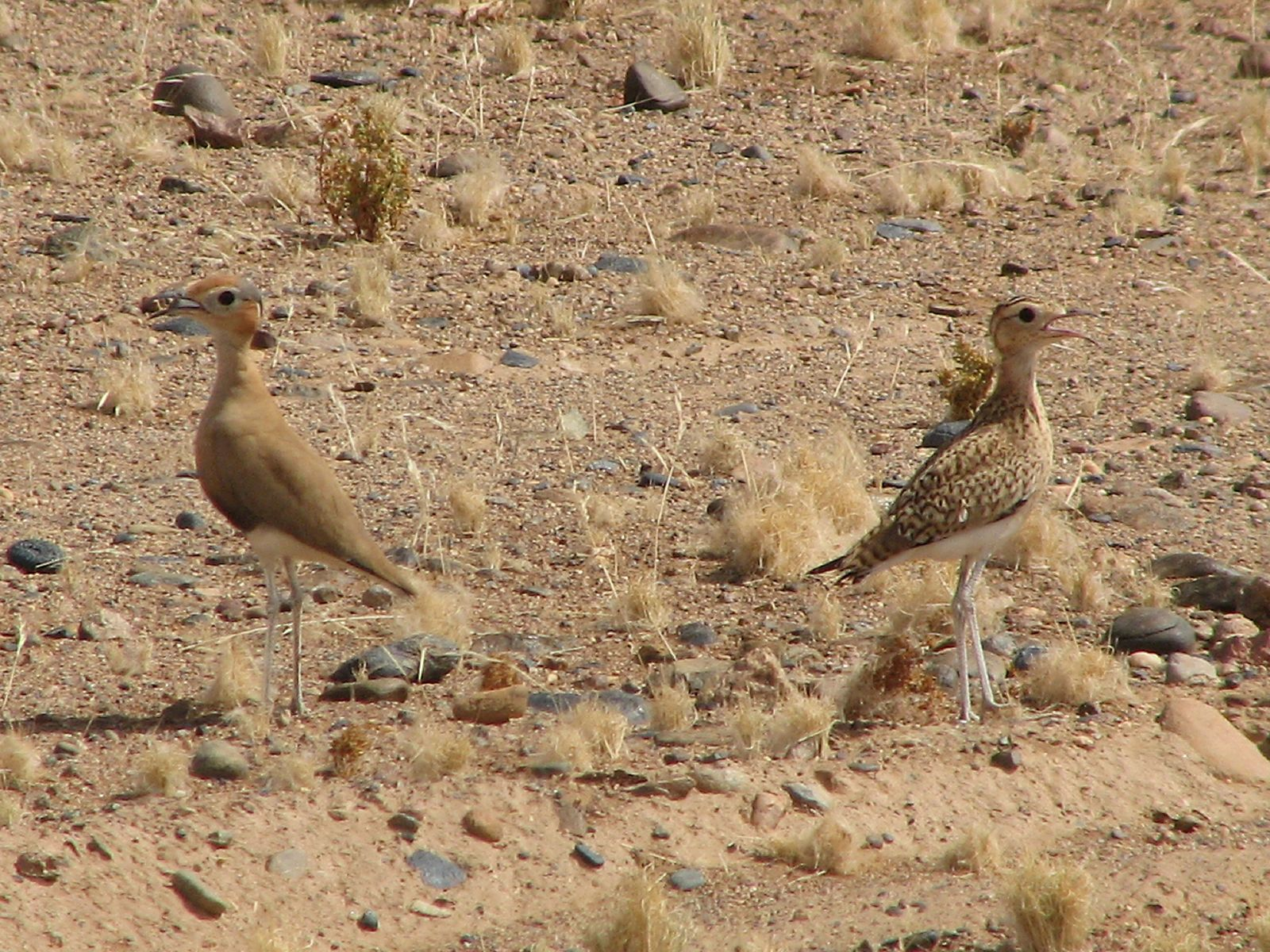
C. rufus in a gravelly desert

Endemic to Africa, Burchell's courser prefers the warm and dry areas of Southern Africa. Specifically, it is found in most of South Africa and Namibia, and in parts of Angola (Southwest) and Botswana (Kalahari Basin). Its distribution range occasionally coincides with that of the Temminck's courser.

Burchell's courser inhabits deserts or semi deserts with gravel rather than just sand, but also open grasslands with short grass, and sparse, burnt, or overgrazed vegetation. It is often referred as locally nomad based on its movements at the landscape level, possibly travelling due to fluctuations in rainfall. Although it is classified as least concern, Its population is declining, potentially due to its habitat loss on arable lands, inadequate farming practices such as intense irrigation and overuse of pesticides, and other anthropogenic disturbances.

== Behaviour ==
The adults have developed a diversionary display as a strategy against predators. They perform "displacement brooding" to distract any potential threats from the nesting area. Even though the chicks are considered precocial, they lack the heat-loss mechanisms present in the adults to survive the hot climate, and thus need shade to avoid overheating.

=== Voice ===
Burchell's courser often prefers to run rather than fly, and will most likely take to the air only when the disturbance is significant. Often referred to as inconspicuous, this bird is mostly quiet on the ground, but becomes vocal when flying, producing a loud flight call. Thus far, three types of vocalizations it produces have been identified: one throaty "chuk" as it launches in the air, a few "chuk chuk" grunts while flying, and a contact call consisting of a "kwirrt-kwirrt" or a "kok-kok-kwich". If threatened by a predator, the Burchell's courser may run away from its nest, emitting an alarm call in order to divert the predator.

=== Feeding ===
Burchell's courser is predominantly an insectivore. It uses its long bill to forage the ground and dig up insects. This bird also runs to catch its prey. It has been found to frequently eat from the Coleoptera group, especially curculionidae beetles as its main food source. However, the Burchell's courser tends to have a preference for harvester termites (Hodotermes mossambicus) when available, which can constitute over 50% of its diet. It almost never chooses seeds as a source of nutrition. The yearly frequency of rainfalls affects the food availability and quality, which is the main reason the Burchell's courser travels around.

=== Breeding ===
Burchell's coursers may occur in small flocks but are mostly solitary, monogamous birds. They have developed an all-year-round breeding strategy due to their nomadic movements, although they often breed just before the wet season between July and December.

With a small clutch size, the Burchell's courser only lays two eggs directly on the ground, sometimes surrounded by stools of antelopes, small rocks, or dried up organic matter. The eggs have an oval shape, and look black from afar, but they are actually of a buff colour with many dark markings. There is a lot of uncertainty when it comes to the hatching and fledging times, but it is believed that both parents participate in the incubation period.
