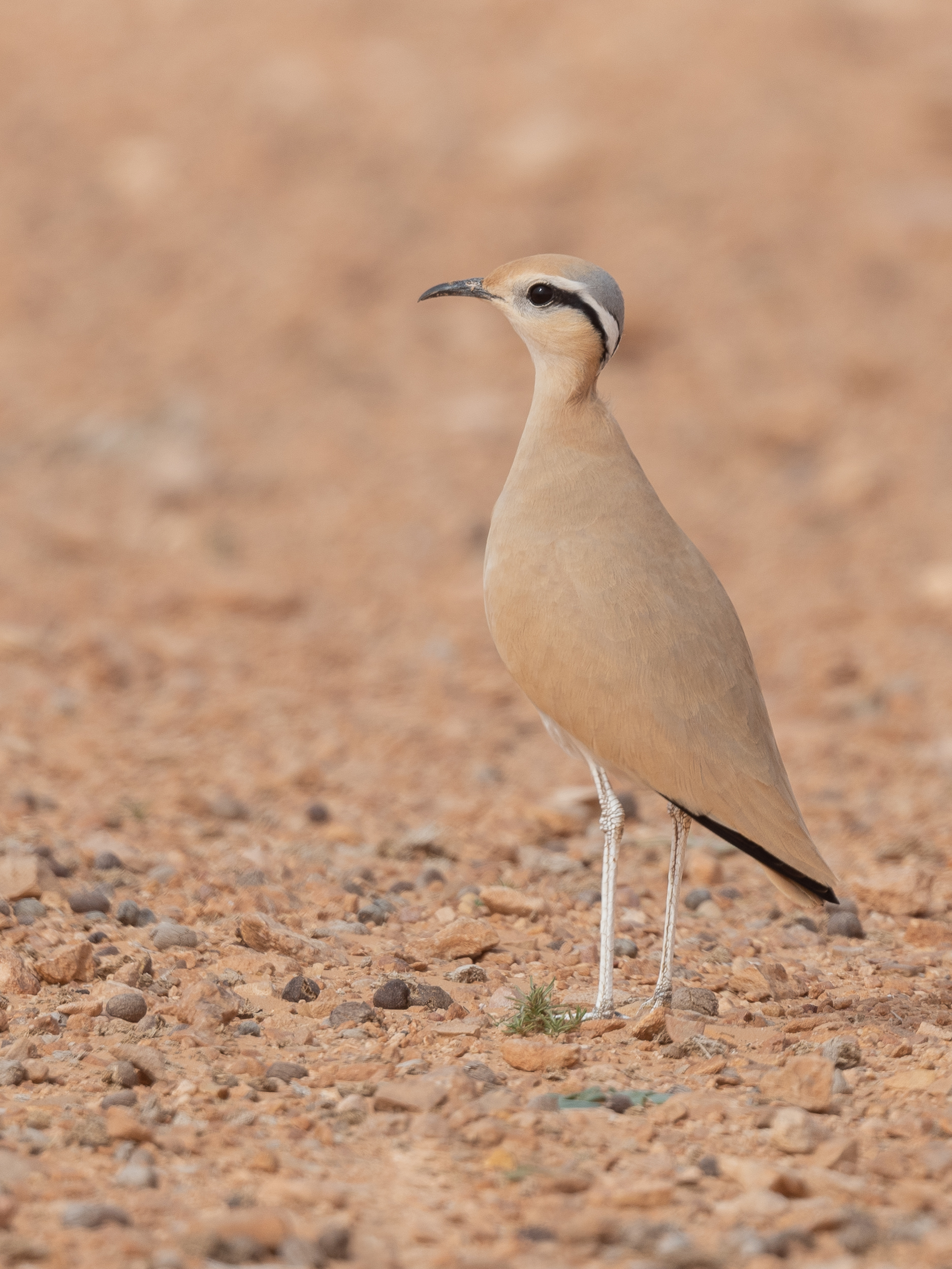
- Adult in Tunisia

Conservation status
- Least Concern (IUCN 3.1)

Scientific classification
- Kingdom: Animalia
- Phylum: Chordata
- Class: Aves
- Order: Charadriiformes
- Family: Glareolidae
- Genus: Cursorius
- Species: C. cursor

Binomial name
- Cursorius cursor (Latham, 1787)
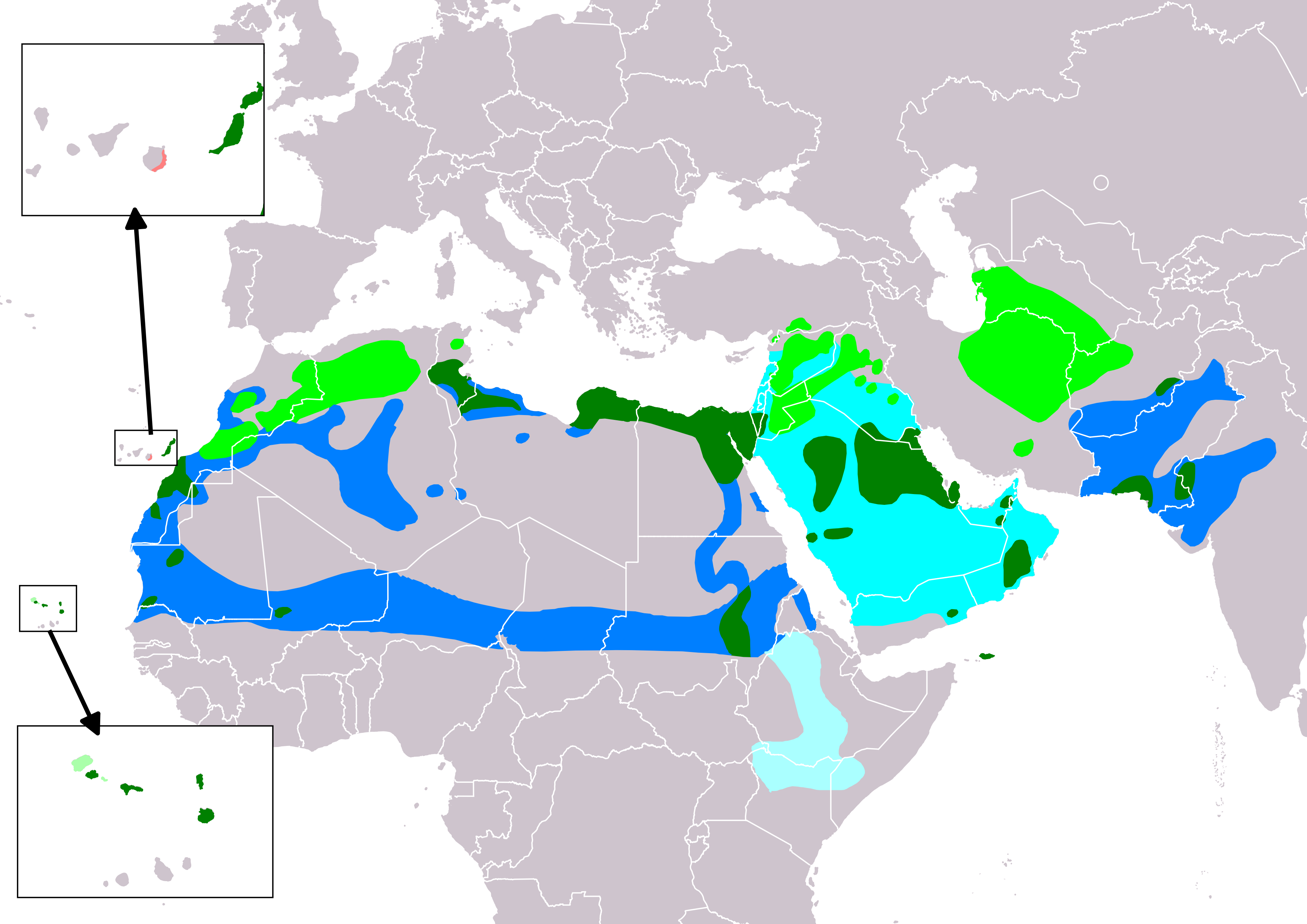
- Range of C. cursor Breeding Resident Non-breeding Passage Probably extinct Possibly Extant (resident) Possibly Extant (non-breeding)

= Cream-coloured courser =

Species of bird

The cream-coloured courser (Cursorius cursor) is a species of wader in the pratincole and courser family, Glareolidae. Both parts of the scientific name derive from Latin cursor, "runner", from currere, "to run" which describes their usual habit as they hunt their insect prey on the ground in dry open semi-desert regions of the Middle East and northern Africa.

== Range ==
Cream-coloured coursers are found in the Canary Islands, Cape Verde, North Africa and Southwest Asia. Their two eggs are laid in a ground scrape. The breeding season extends from February to September, but they may also breed in autumn and winter when local conditions (especially rainfall) are favourable. They are partially migratory, with northern and northwestern birds wintering across the southern edge of the Sahara, in Arabia, and in northwestern India. The species also breeds in the southern desert regions in northwestern India and Pakistan, and has bred occasionally in southern Spain.

They are rare north of the breeding range, but this species has occurred as far north as Finland, Norway and Great Britain; they are more regular on Malta, with flocks of up to 30 recorded there.

== Description ==
Cream-coloured coursers are variously cited as 19–21 cm, 21–24 cm, or 24–27 cm long; the wingspan is 51–57 cm. They have long (7–8 cm) legs, long wings, and slightly downcurved bills. The body plumage is sandy in colour, fading to whitish on the lower belly. The outer upperwing and the underwing are black. The crown is grey, grading to blue-grey on the nape, and there is a black eyestripe and a conspicuous white supercilium. The legs are pale grey. Juveniles are mottled dark above, and have a duller head pattern than adults. In flight, this species resembles a pratincole with its relaxed wingbeats, pointed wings and black underwings.

== Subspecies ==
Three subspecies are currently accepted:

- C. c. cursor (Latham, 1787) — Canary Islands, North Africa, and the Arabian Peninsula to Iraq. Smaller, weighing 102–119 g. Migratory or dispersive.
- C. c. bogolubovi (Zarudny, 1885) — southeast Turkey to Iran, Afghanistan, southern Pakistan to northwest India. Larger, weighing 115–156 g. Migratory or dispersive.
- C. c. exsul (Hartert, 1920) — Cape Verde Islands. Similar size to nominate, but slightly darker plumage. Nonmigratory.

Birds on the eastern Canary Islands were formerly sometimes treated as a fourth subspecies C. c. bannermani, but are now included in nominate C. c. cursor.

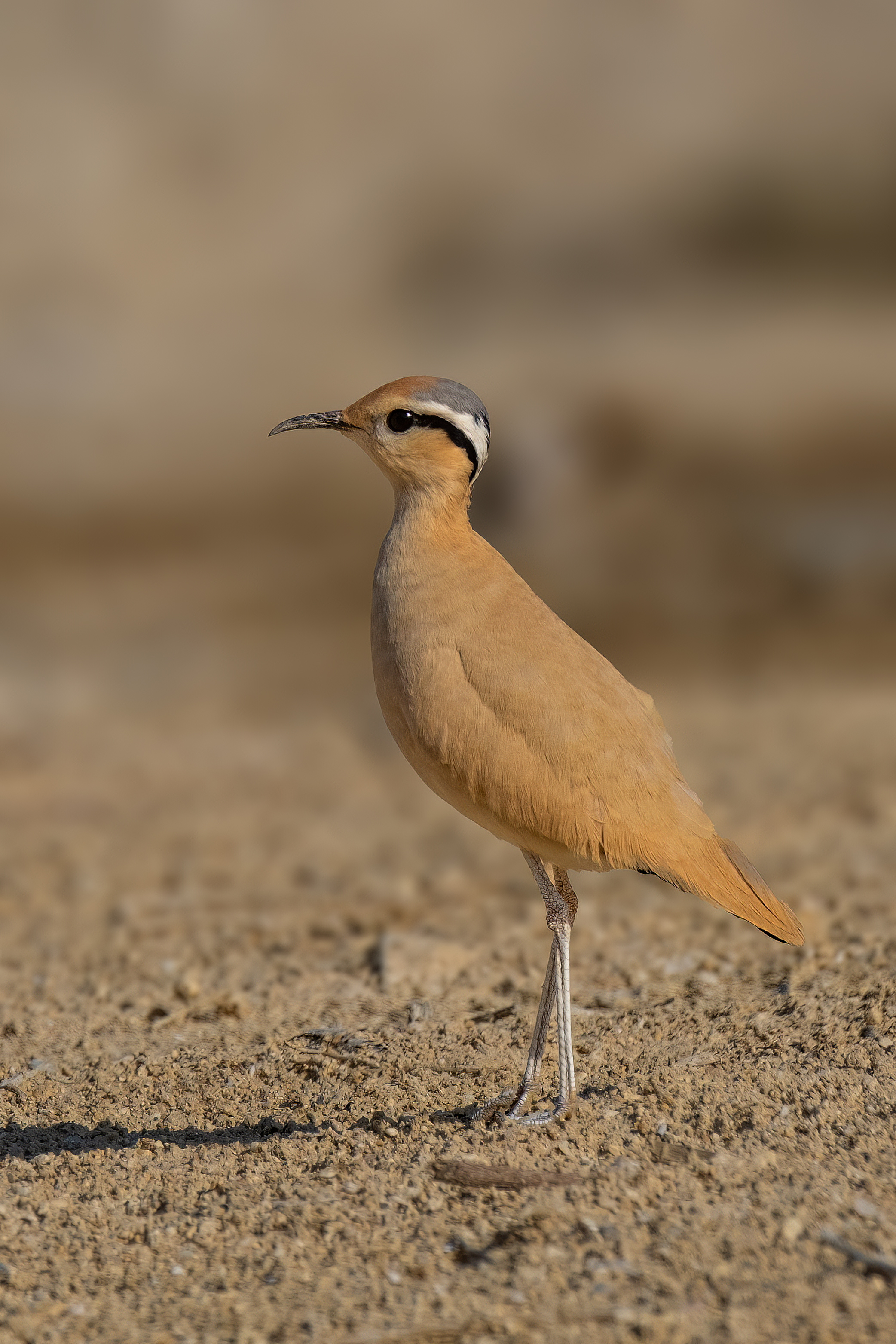
Adult C. c. cursor in Wadi Degla, Egypt

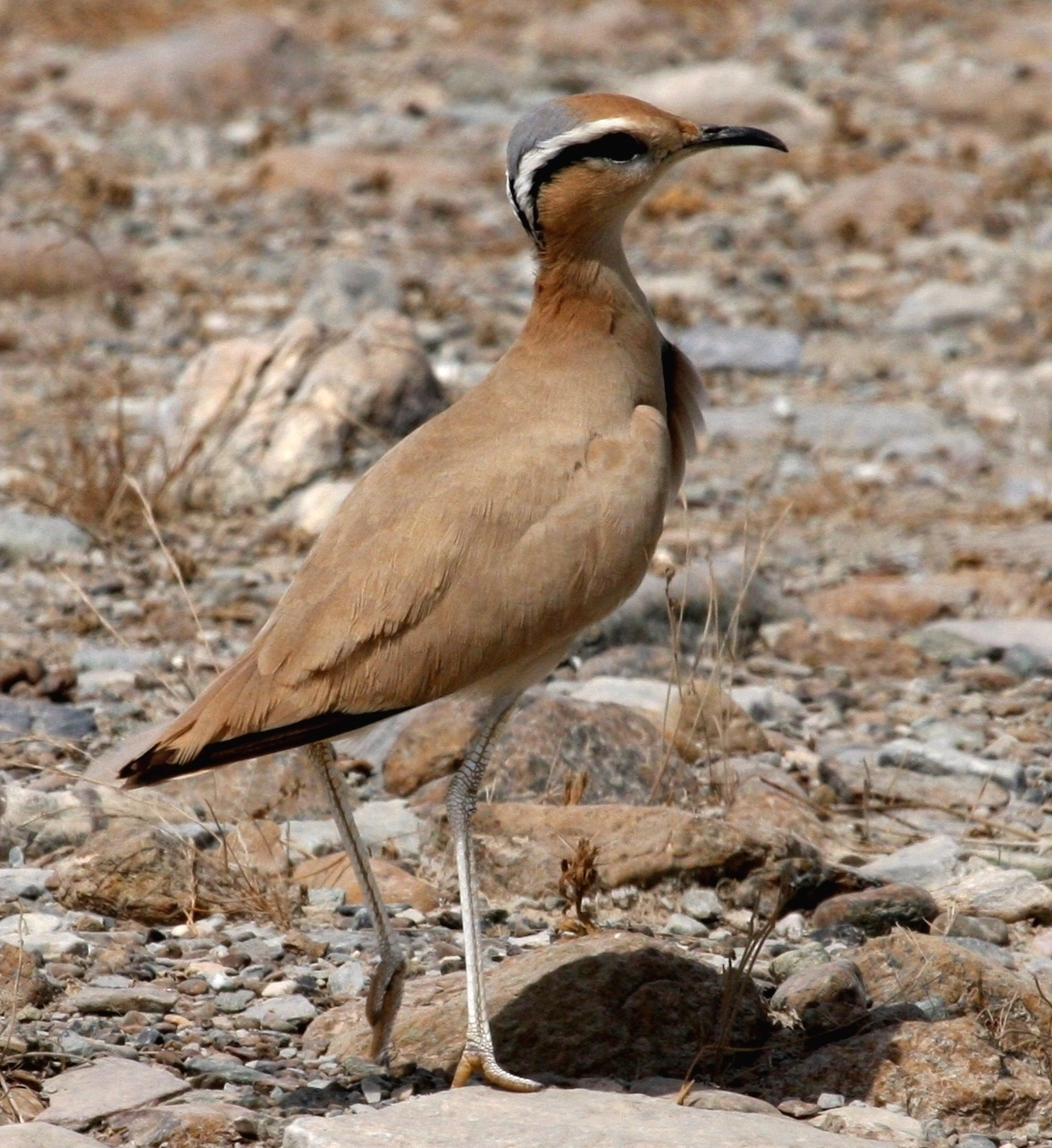
Adult C. c. cursor in Dibba, United Arab Emirates

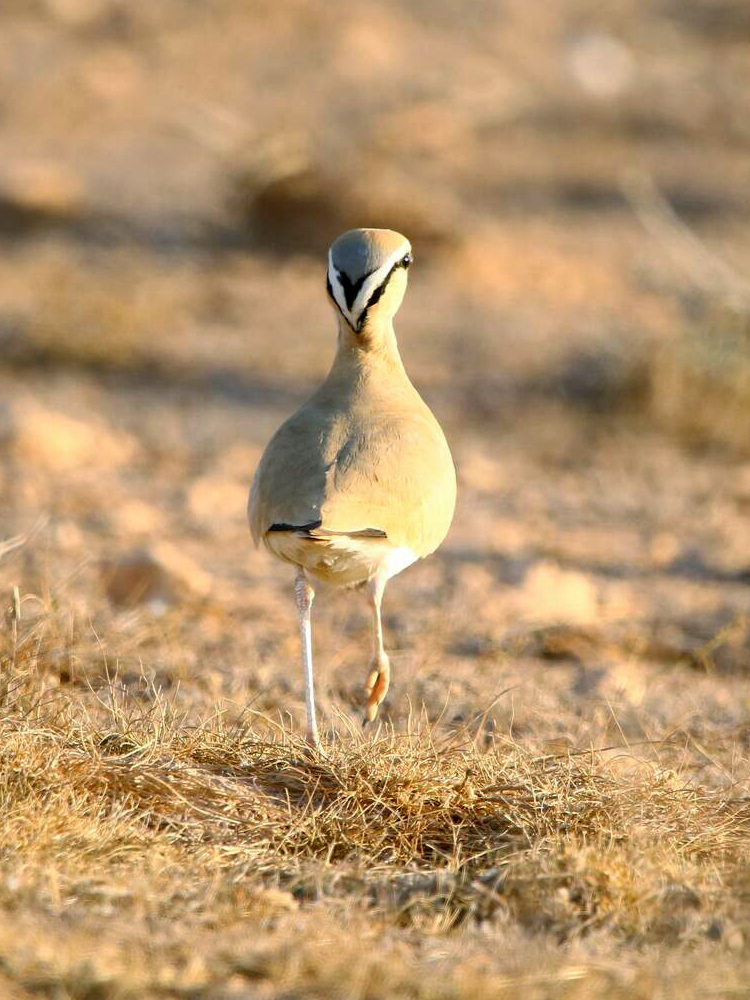
Adult C. c. cursor, rear view showing the white supercilia meeting on the nape

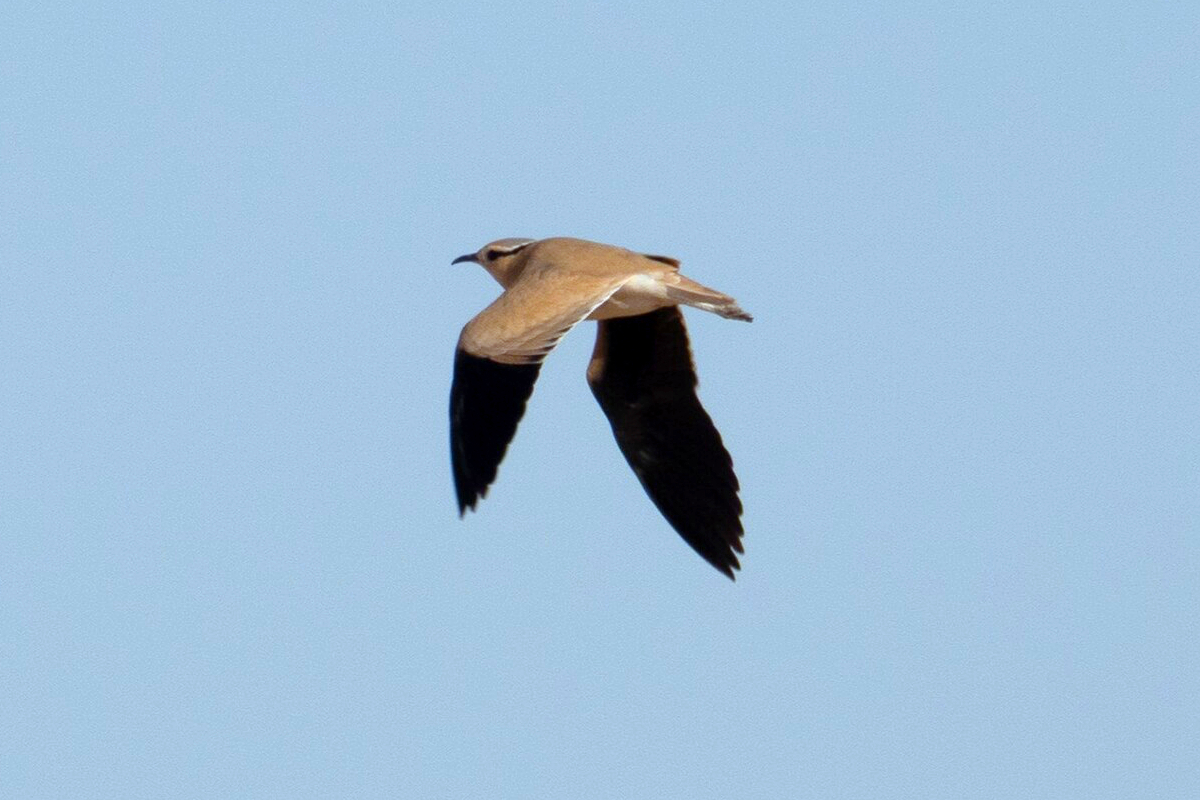
Adult C. c. cursor in flight, showing the black outer upperwing and entirely black underwing; Western Sahara

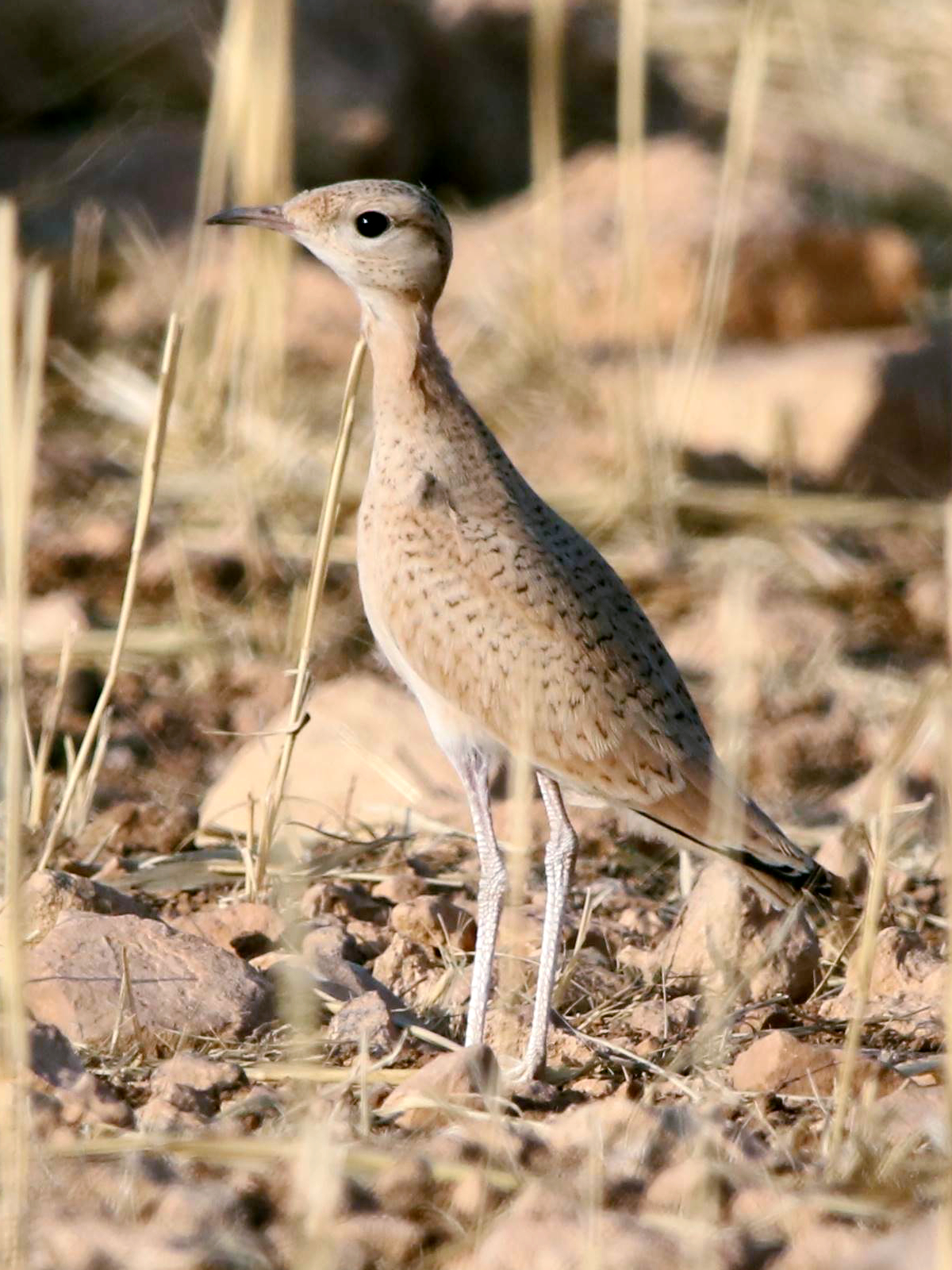
Juvenile C. c. cursor, El Achir, Algeria

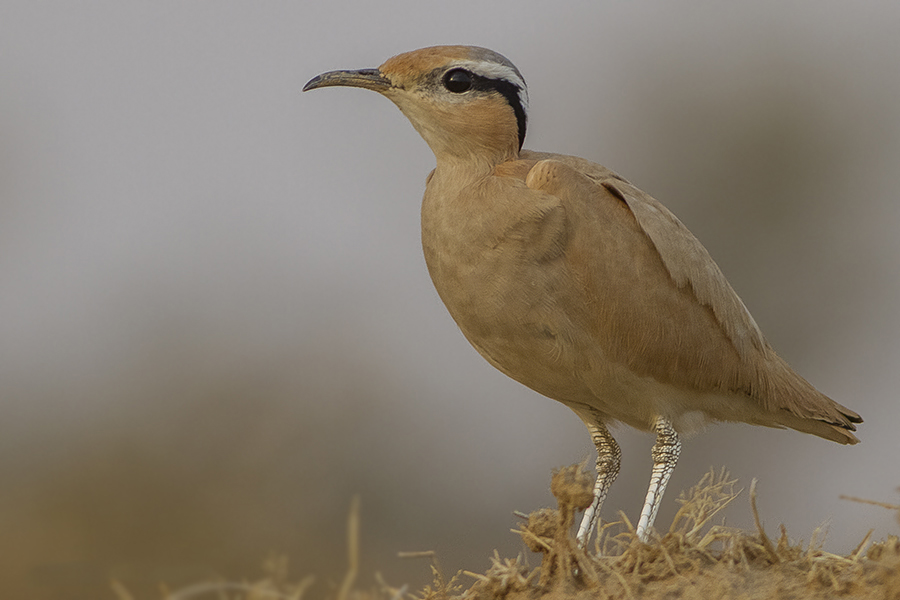
Adult C. c. bogolubovi, Tal Chhapar Sanctuary, Churu, Rajasthan, India

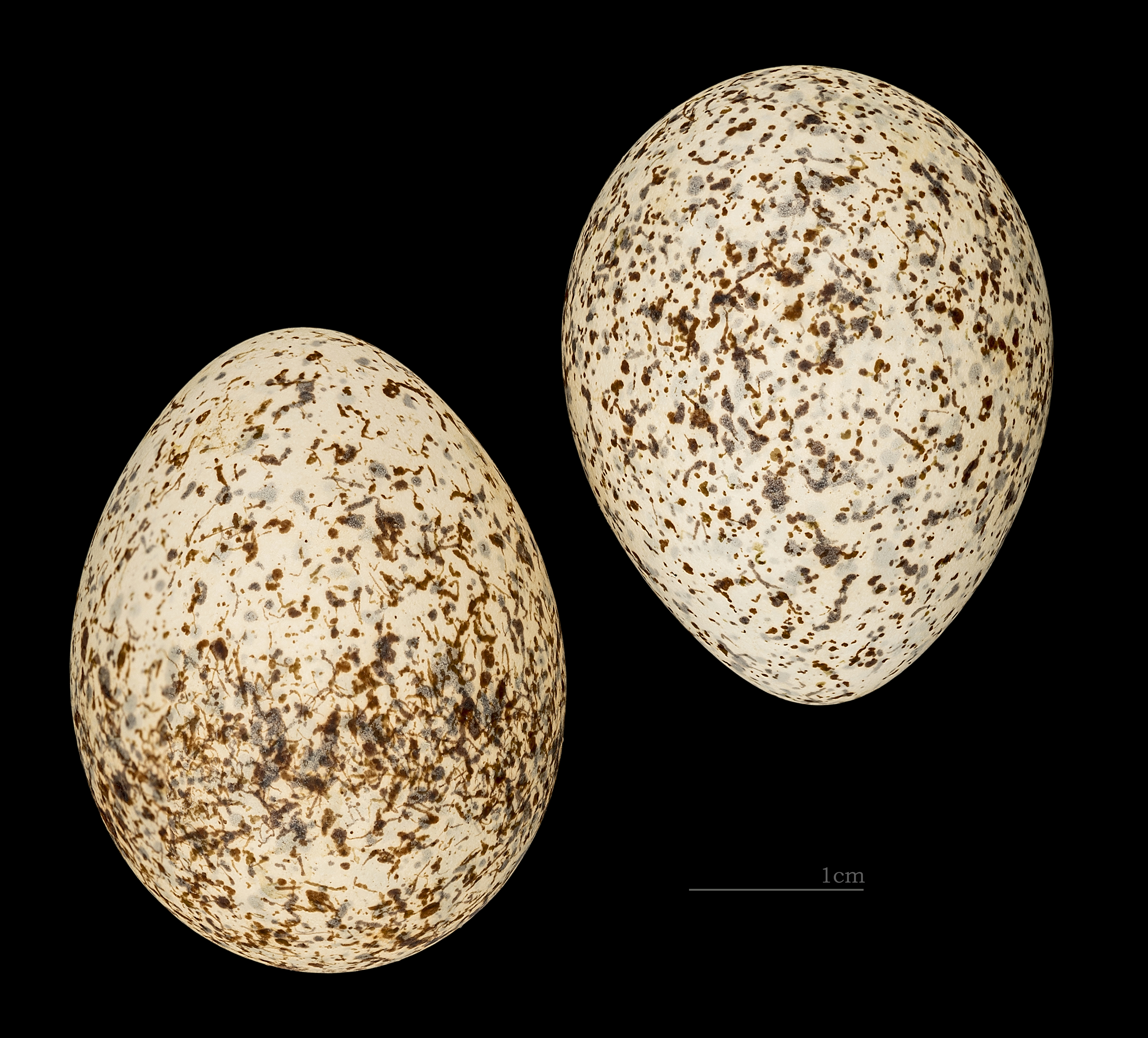
Eggs collected from Tunisia, in the Muséum de Toulouse collection

== Taxonomic note ==
The East African taxa littoralis and somalensis, currently treated as a separate species Somali courser, have in the past been considered as subspecies of cream-coloured courser by some authors, or by others as subspecies of the Southern African Burchell's courser.
