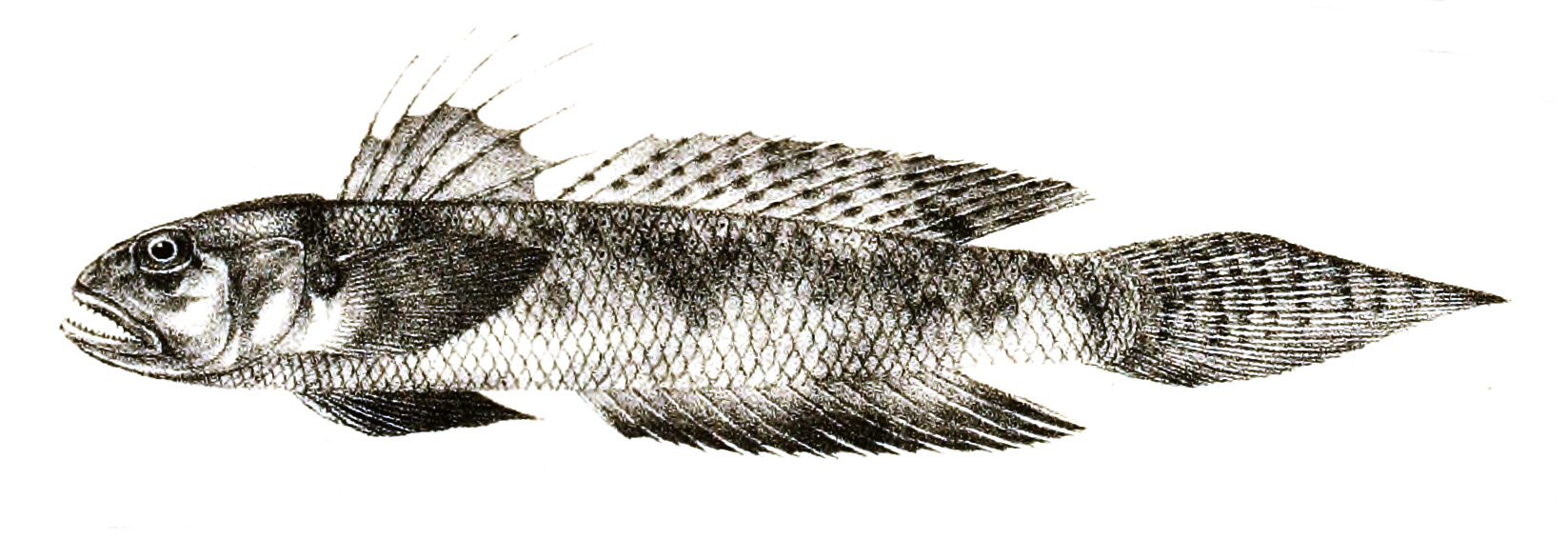

Conservation status
- Least Concern (IUCN 3.1)

Scientific classification
- Kingdom: Animalia
- Phylum: Chordata
- Class: Actinopterygii
- Order: Gobiiformes
- Family: Oxudercidae
- Genus: Oxyurichthys
- Species: O. microlepis

Binomial name
- Oxyurichthys microlepis (Bleeker, 1849)

Synonyms
- Gobius microlepis Bleeker, 1849; Oxyurichthyes microlepis (Bleeker, 1849); Oxyuricthyes microlepis (Bleeker, 1849); Euctenogobius cristatus F. Day, 1873; Gobius cristatus (F. Day, 1873); Gobius longicauda Steindachner, 1893; Oxyurichthys longicauda (Steindachner, 1893); Gobius nuchalis Barnard, 1927

= Oxyurichthys microlepis =

Species of fish

Oxyurichthys microlepis, commonly known as the maned goby, is a species of goby native to tropical marine and brackish waters along the coasts of the Indian Ocean from Africa to the western Pacific Ocean where it occurs in estuaries and inshore waters to depths of about 75 metres (246 ft). It occurs in the Mekong Delta and is suspected to use the tidal flow up the river to reach as far inland as Cambodia. This species can reach a length of 13.5 centimetres (5.3 in) TL. It is of minor importance to local commercial fisheries and can also be found in the aquarium trade.
