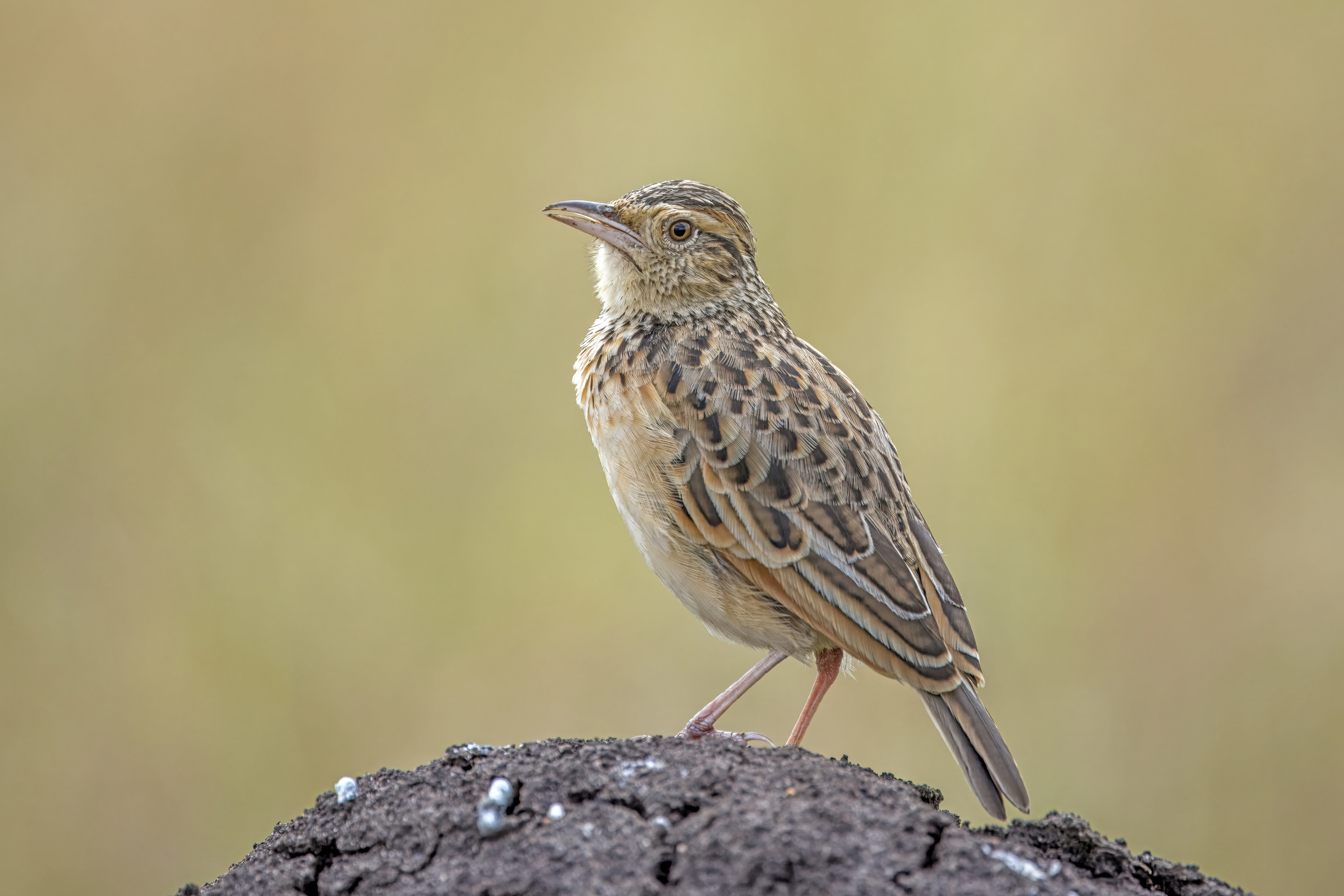
- M. a. tropicalis Serengeti National Park, Tanzania

Conservation status
- Least Concern (IUCN 3.1)

Scientific classification
- Kingdom: Animalia
- Phylum: Chordata
- Class: Aves
- Order: Passeriformes
- Family: Alaudidae
- Genus: Corypha
- Species: C. africana

Binomial name
- Corypha africana (Smith, 1836)

Audio
- Song recorded in Kiboko, Kenya

= Rufous-naped lark =

Species of bird

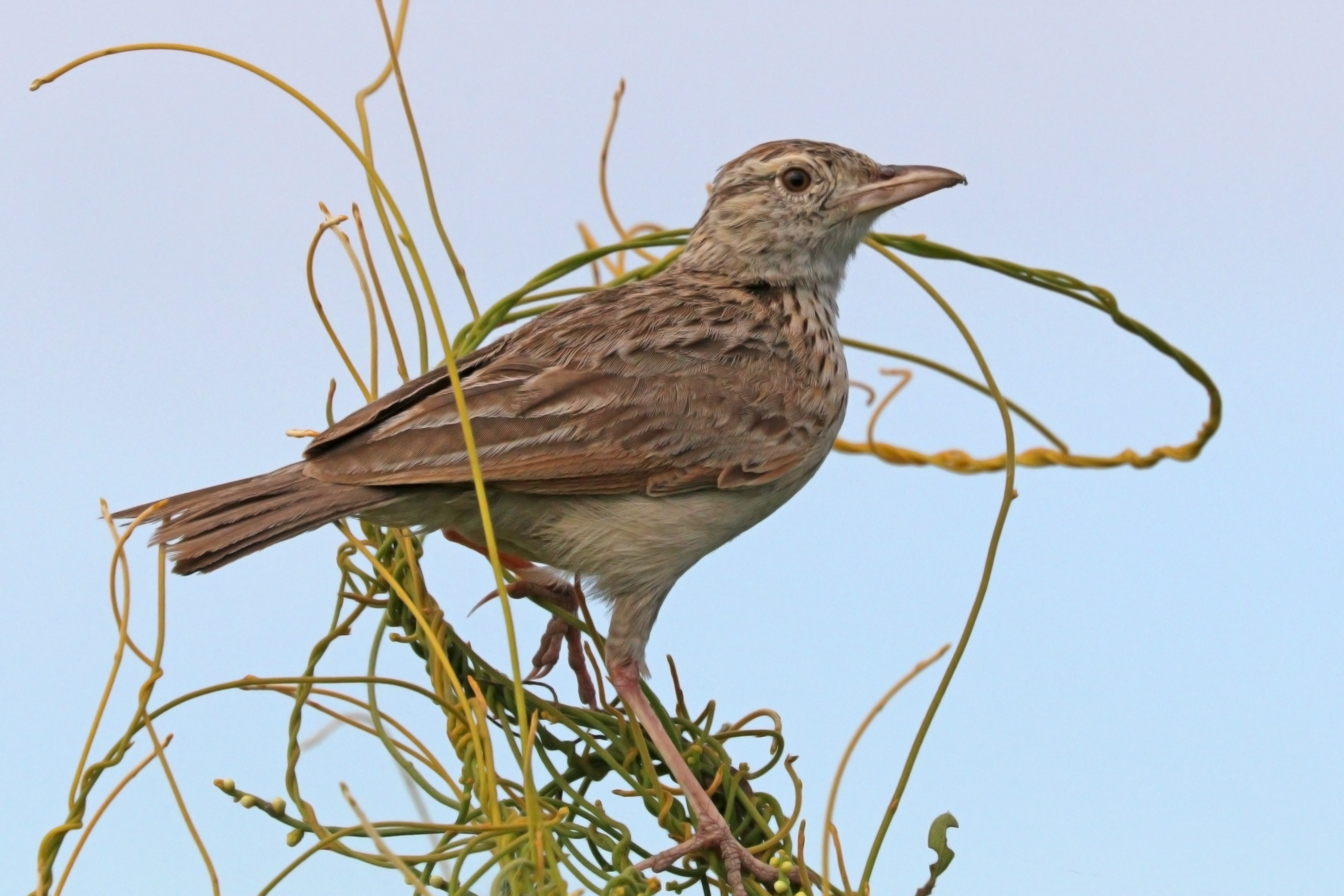
M. a. ghansiensis in Namibia

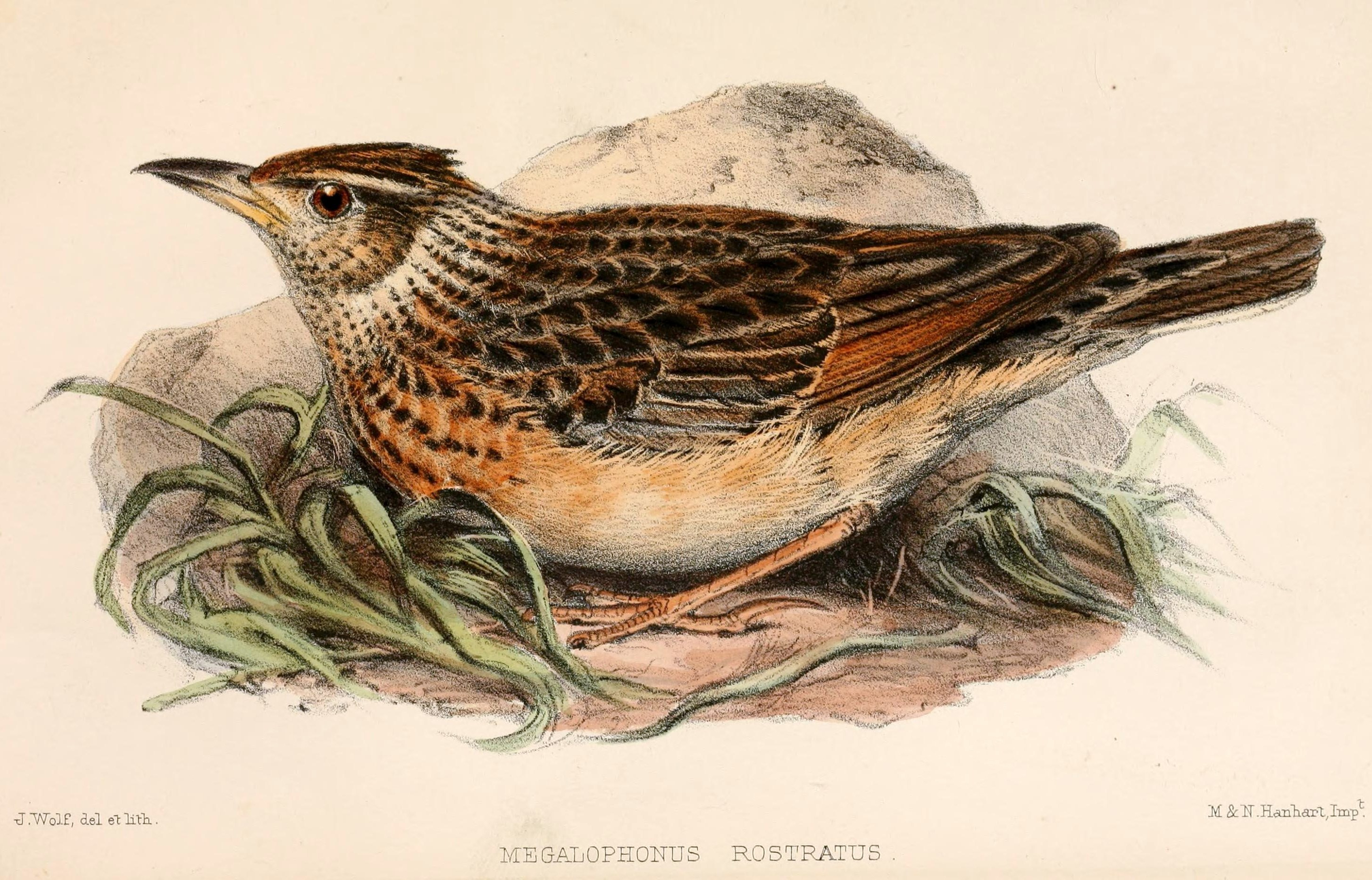
Nominate race M. a. africana is native to the Eastern Cape, South Africa

The rufous-naped lark (Corypha africana) or rufous-naped bush lark is a widespread and conspicuous species of lark in the lightly wooded grasslands, open savannas and farmlands of the Afrotropics. Males attract attention to themselves by a bold and often repeated wing-fluttering display from a prominent perch, which is accompanied by a melodious and far-carrying whistled phrase. This rudimentary display has been proposed as the precursor to the wing-clapping displays of other bush lark species. They have consistently rufous outer wings and a short erectile crest, but the remaining plumage hues and markings are individually and geographically variable. It has a straight lower, and longish, curved upper mandible.

== Taxonomy and systematics ==
The rufous-naped lark was formerly placed in the genus Mirafra. It is one of several species that were moved to the resurrected genus Corypha based on the results of a large molecular genetic study by the Swedish ornithologist Per Alström and collaborators that was published in 2023.

In 2024 a comprehensive study of taxa placed in the genus Corypha was published that combined the analysis of the plumage, morphology, vocalization and phylogenetics. Based on the conclusions, the rufous-naped lark was split into six species.

The rufous-naped lark is geographically very variable, and is taken to form a species complex with the allopatric red-winged lark of East Africa, and perhaps with the Somali lark. It is a smaller version of the first, with a finer bill and shorter tail, but their morphological and vocal features do not intergrade where their ranges meet. The rufous nape is an equivocal field character, being absent in the tropical races and in some individuals.

Due to the inherent variability of the species, some of the 23–25 odd races are perhaps insufficiently distinct or clinal. Consequently, M. a. rostrata and M. a. zuluensis are sometimes merged with M. a. africana, and M. a. okahandjae with M. a. pallida. On the other hand, a few taxa are arguably incipient or full species. The distinctly plumaged blackish lark comprises races M. a. nyikae and M. a. nigrescens, and is altitudinally isolated from M. a. transvaalensis in nearby Tanzania. Malbrant's lark, M. (a.) malbranti, which ranges from Gabon to Angola, has a fairly distinct display flight, but may intergrade with M. a. kabalii in Zambia.

Sharpe's lark, M. (a.) sharpii, of northwestern Somalia, has almost plain, coppery red upper parts and is sometimes (e.g., by Sibley and Monroe) regarded as a separate and endangered species. Its small range of some 21,200 km^{2} is impacted by overgrazing and conversion to croplands. It may however be conspecific with Somali lark, M. (a.) somalica, which differs by its very long bill and white edges to the outer tail feathers. The Somali lark is sometimes considered a race of rufous-naped lark, but is alternatively deemed a full species in Mirafra or Certhilauda.

=== Subspecies ===
Eleven subspecies are recognized:

- C. a. tropicalis (Hartert, EJO, 1900) – east Uganda and west Kenya to northwest Tanzania
- C. a. ruwenzoria (Kinnear, 1921) – east DR Congo to southwest Uganda
- C. a. chapini (Grant, CHB & Mackworth-Praed, 1939) – southeast DR Congo and northwest Zambia
- C. a. occidentalis (Hartlaub, 1857) – west Angola
- C. a. gomesi (White, CMN, 1944) – east Angola and west Zambia
- C. a. grisescens (Sharpe, 1902) – west Zambia, north Botswana and northwest Zimbabwe
- C. a. pallida (Sharpe, 1902) – southwest Angola and northwest Namibia
- C. a. ghansiensis (Roberts, 1932) – east Namibia and west Botswana
- C. a. isolata (Clancey, 1956) – southeast Malawi
- C. a. transvaalensis (Hartert, EJO, 1900) – Tanzania to north South Africa
- C. a. africana (Smith, A, 1836) – southeast South Africa

The following five species were formerly considered to be subspecies:

- Highland lark (Corypha kurrae) (including bamendae, stresemanni, batesi, henrici)
- Sentinel lark (Corypha athi) (including harterti)
- Plains lark (Corypha kabalii) (including malbranti, irwini)
- Plateau lark (Corypha nigrescens) (including nyikae)
- Russet lark (Corypha sharpii)

== Description ==
The rufous-naped lark is a fairly large and robust lark species, with rather heavy flight. The sexes are similar, but males average larger and heavier. Adults are individually and geographically variable. It measures 15–18 cm from bill tip to tail tip and weighs 40-44 g. The streaked upper parts, short erectile crest, creamy-buff eyebrow that merges with the lore, and the rufous flight feathers are easily discernible features. The hindcrown and nape are streaked along the feather centers while the margins vary from chestnut, rufous or pinkish buff to greyish brown. The wings appear conspicuously rufous in flight, while the outer edges of the primaries show up as a rufous panel on the closed wing. The underwing coverts are rufous, and upper coverts are broadly edged tawny or buff (or grey in race grisescens). The tail is dark brown, but the outer webs of the outer tail feathers vary from buff (cf. africana and sharpii) to tawny or bright rufous. The mantle is lighter brown than the back, and the rump still darker brown. The flanks are a shade darker than the rufous-buff belly, but regionally the plumage may also be stained red by soil. The throat is unmarked but the pale rufous upper breast is streaked and spotted darker brown. The eyes are hazel brown, the longish bill is blackish and pinkish, and the feet pink to pinkish brown. Juveniles have bold black spotting on the crown, mantle and wing coverts, all edged with buff, while the breast spotting is more blotchy or diffuse.

=== Geographic variation ===
M. a. athi of the Kenyan highlands is typically coloured, but like other tropical races, lacks the rufous nape. Most accepted races are distinguished based on the colour of the back or underpart plumage, or the amount of streaking on the ear coverts and flanks. High altitude races M. a. nyikae and M. a. nigrescens, which occur above 2,000 meters, have very dark upper part plumages and increased flank streaking. M. a. tropicalis which is found above 1,000 meters has a solid rufous wash over the underparts. Of the southern African races, those in the southeast are the largest and darkest (cf. M. a. africana and M. a. rostrata), with a cline towards lightly streaked and pale pinkish plumages in the northwest.

== Distribution and habitat ==
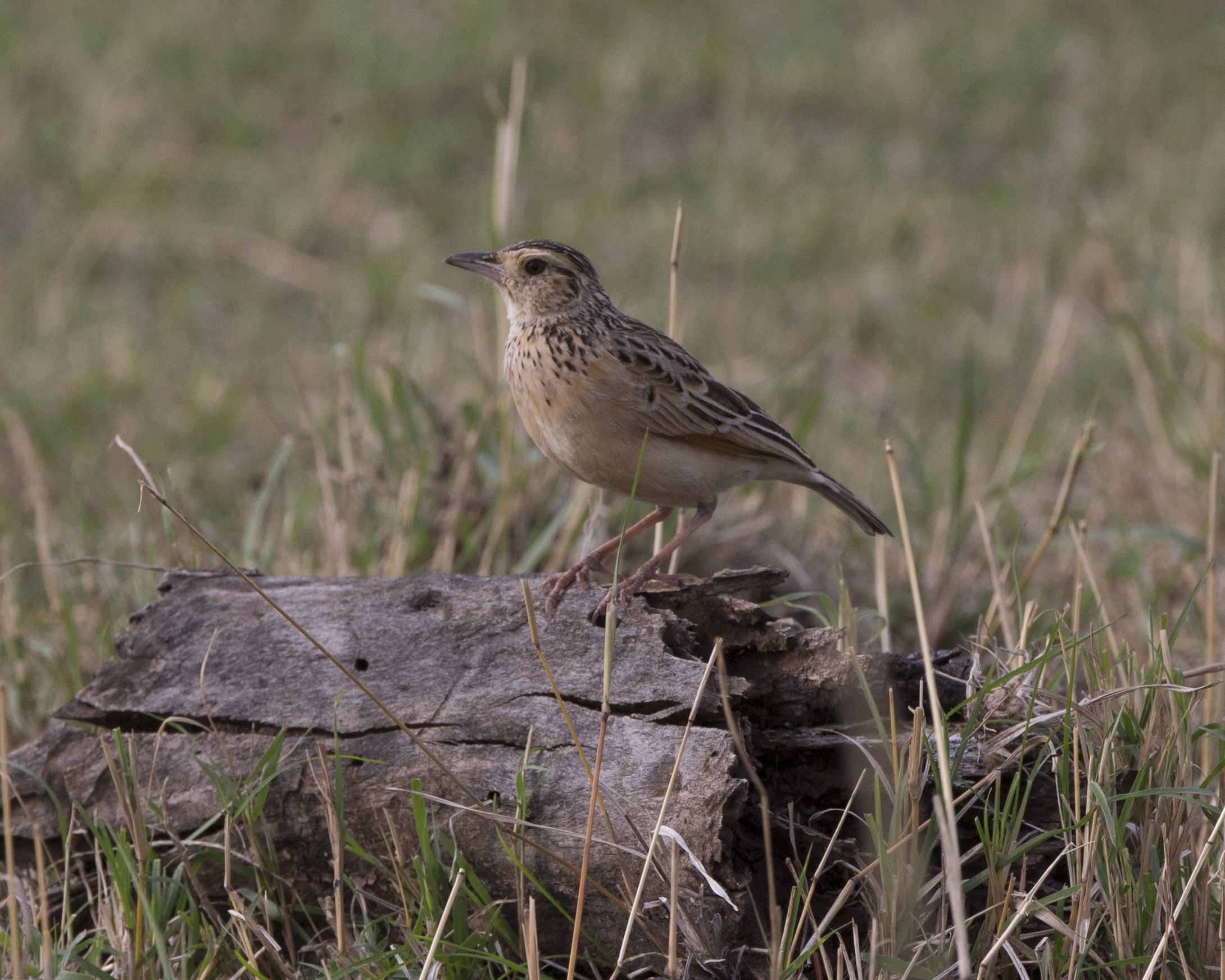
M. a. tropicalis in the Maasai Mara, Kenya

The rufous-naped lark is found in many parts of sub-Saharan Africa. It has a very large but discontinuous range, with an estimated global extent of occurrence of 5,600,000 km^{2}. Its range is believed to be increasingly fragmented in the north, from which a declining population is inferred. The southern African population has not contracted in range or abundance, save for areas of extensive cultivation or urbanization. Livestock ranching is believed to have created bare patches in grasslands, which they favour. The populations of southern Mozambique and Eswatini have been estimated at >50,000 and 100,000 individuals respectively.

It tolerates a range of dry or mesic habitats, typically bushy grassland or sparsely wooded savannah. It also occurs along the fringes of marshes, in woodland clearings or in the fragmented ecotone of woodland and grassland. It is present from near sea level in the south, to about 3,000 meters near the equator. In Zimbabwe it occurs from 900 to 1,800 meters, and in East Africa from 1,000 to 3,000 meters. Termitaria, bushes, small trees or fence posts provide perches for display, while a combination of tall and short grass provides cover and foraging space. In southern Africa it occurs only sparsely in grassy fynbos, grassy karoo and upland sour grasslands, but has high reporting rates in the Eastern Highlands of Zimbabwe, in miombo and in sweet or mixed grasslands.

== Behaviour and ecology ==
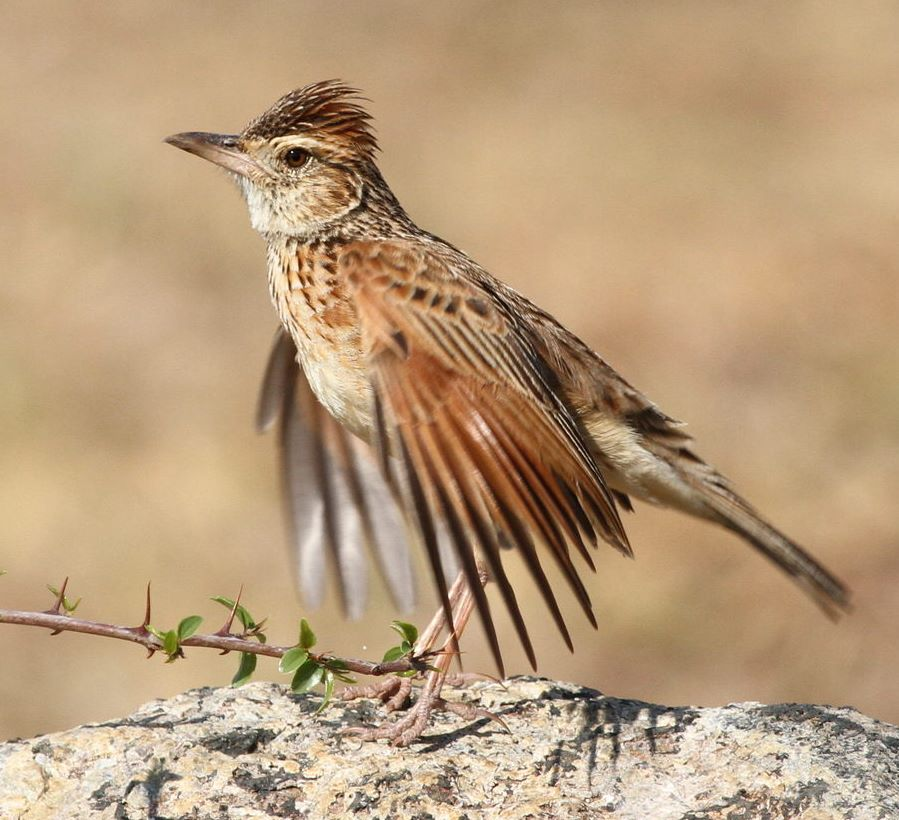
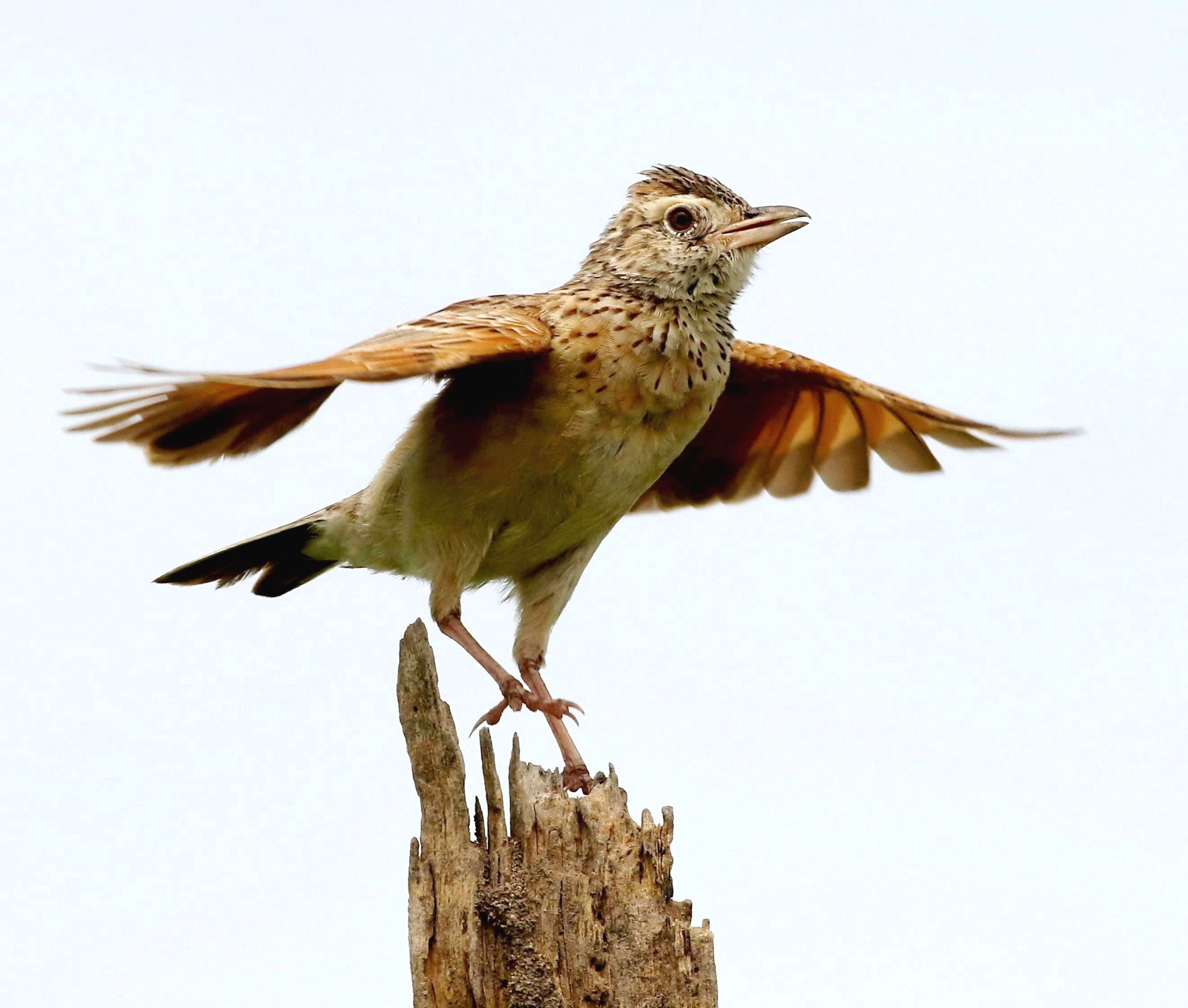
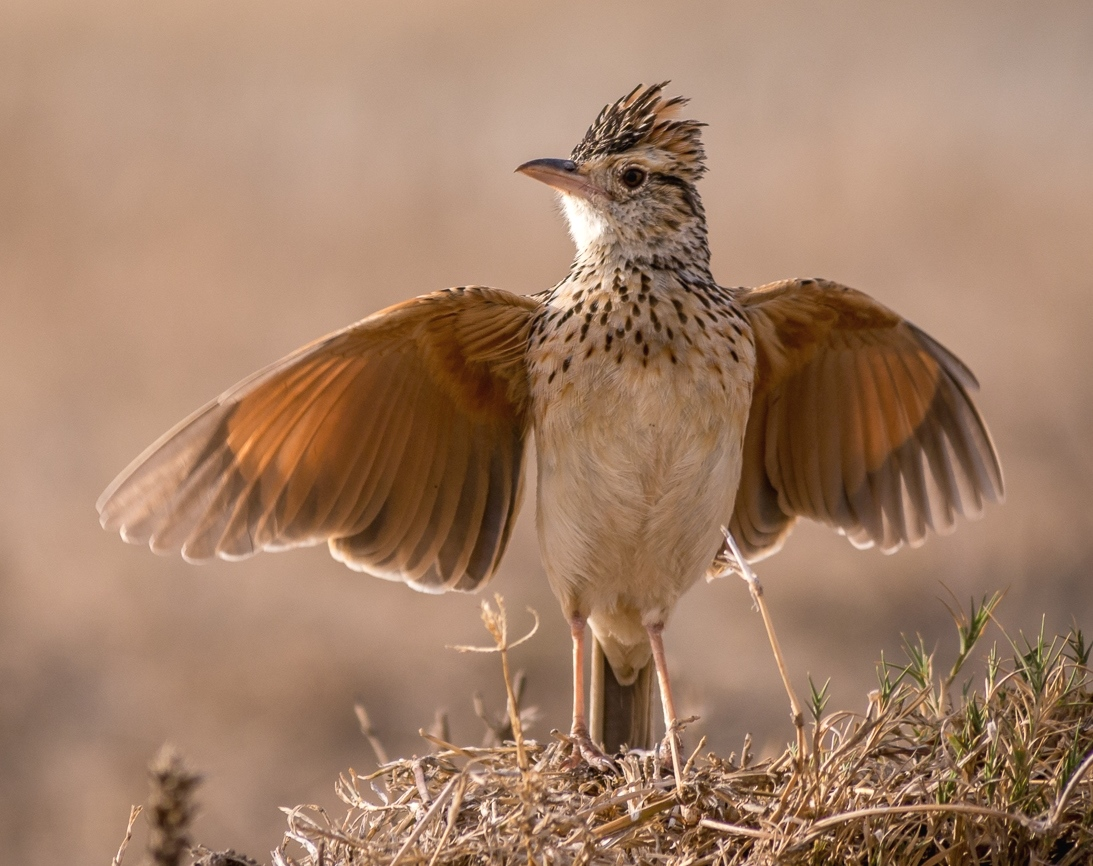
Males of M. a. transvaalensis, M. a. grisescens and M. a. tropicalis fluttering wings in display

The rufous-naped lark is sedentary, territorial and monogamous. It is often sluggish, allowing a close approach. Short distances are covered in low, level or undulating flight, or it may flee an intruder by running and dodging through grass haphazardly. It may be difficult to flush from grass, and is easily overlooked when not singing.

At any time of the year, but especially when the rains commence, a male will spend hours calling from a conspicuous perch. A clear, somewhat variable, whistled phrase of three to five syllables is typical, which may be rendered as tseep-tseeoo, teeoo-teewee or chiwiki-chiwi. The song may be changed after each 20 or so repetitions. During some intermissions the wings are audibly fluttered in the few seconds between phrases. This results in a quick prrrrt or phrrrp rattle, and may lift the bird off its perch. The crest is also lifted during display. It may alternatively sing a rudimentary song consisting of whistles, tweets and trills (distinguishable as imitated calls), during short flights over the grass or during an upward spiraling flight, before it planes down. Race malbranti in particular, may sing during a straight and direct display flight and clap its wings above its back. Perched males may also string together fragments of the songs of various grassland birds. It utters peewit, tweekiree or pree, pree notes in alarm.

=== Breeding ===
The male will courtship feed the female to reinforce their pair-bond or to secure a mating opportunity. The nest is a well concealed cup of dry grass that is positioned in a deep scrape at the base of a grass tuft or against a shrub. A flimsy or substantial grass dome (typical of Mirafra and related genera) covers the nest while leaving a front entrance. The cup is lined with finer plant material, and 2 to 3 (rarely 4) eggs are laid. The eggs are white, cream or pink in colour, and speckled brown and grey, especially near the blunter end. The chicks have bright yellow gapes, three black tongue spots, and a spot near the tip of the lower mandible. They are covered in pale grey to buff down, and are brooded by the female only. The incubation period is about 14 to 15 days, and singing by the male decreases as incubation commences. The young are fed by both parents, though mainly by the female. Surviving chicks leave the nest after about 12 days, before they are able to fly. Post-breeding moult has been recorded in mid December in Botswana and from July to August in Kenya.

=== Food and feeding ===
It forages at the bases of grass tufts, on bare ground including cultivated lands and fallow fields, and between ungulate droppings. It may also catch termite alates in the air or as they emerge from termitaria, or glean insects from plants. Food includes insects of various groups, spiders, solifugids, millipedes, earthworms, and in winter some seeds of grasses and forbs. It may forage in burnt grassland immediately after fires.
