= Clapper lark =

The clapper lark has been split into two species:

- Cape clapper lark, Mirafra apiata
- Eastern clapper lark, Mirafra fasciolata
