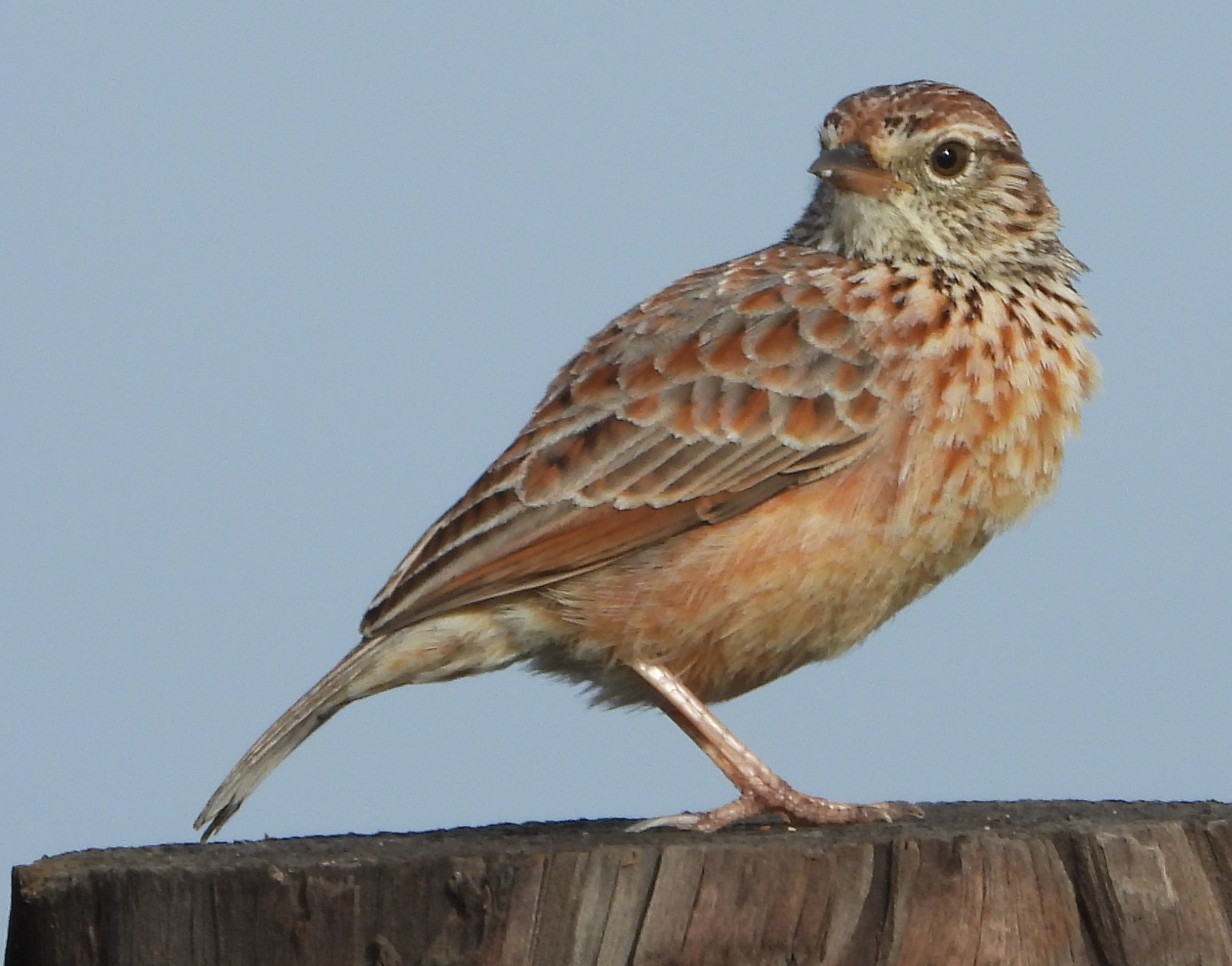
- Cape clapper lark (Amirafra apiata marjoriae)

Scientific classification
- Kingdom: Animalia
- Phylum: Chordata
- Class: Aves
- Order: Passeriformes
- Family: Alaudidae
- Genus: Corypha; Gray, GR, 1840

Type species
- Alauda apiata Cape clapper lark Vieillot, 1816

= Corypha (bird) =

Genus of birds

Corypha is a genus of larks in the family Alaudidae. These species were formerly placed in the genus Mirafra. They are widely distributed in open savannah-type habitats across sub-Saharan Africa.

== Taxonomy ==
A 2023 molecular phylogenetic study of the lark family Alaudidae by the Swedish ornithologist Per Alström and his collaborators found that the genus Mirafra contained deep internal genetic divergences. They therefore split Mirafra into four genera, each corresponding to a major clade. For one of these clades they resurrected the genus Corypha that had originally been introduced in 1840 by the English zoologist George Gray with Alauda apiata Vieillot, 1816, the Cape clapper lark, as the type species. The name Corypha is from Ancient Greek κορυφος/koruphos, an unknown bird mentioned by the Greek author Hesychius of Alexandria that is usually assumed to be a lark.

A comprehensive integrated study of the genus, published in 2024, combined analyses of the plumage, morphology, vocalization and phylogenetics. This led to a substantial revision of the specific boundaries and an increase in the number of recognised species.

The phylogeny shown below is based on the 2024 study by Per Alström and collaborators.

- Corypha
  - - Cape clapper lark (Corypha apiata)
    - Eastern clapper lark (Corypha fasciolata)
  - - Highland lark (Corypha kurrae)
    - - Plains lark (Corypha kaballi)
      - - - Plateau lark (Corypha nigrescens)
          - Rufous-naped lark (Corypha africana)
        - - Sentinel lark (Corypha athi)
          - - Somali lark (Corypha somalica)
            - - Red-winged lark (Corypha hypermetra)
              - - Kidepo lark (Corypha kidepoensis)
                - Russet lark (Corypha sharpii)

The genus contains the following eleven species:

Image	Common name	Scientific name	Distribution
	Cape clapper lark	Corypha apiata	Southwest Namibia and west South Africa (nominate); southwest South Africa (subspecies marjoriae).
	Eastern clapper lark	Corypha fasciolata (split from C. apiata)	Zambia, Namibia, Botswana, Lesotho, and South Africa.
	Kidepo lark	Corypha kidepoensis (split from C. hypermetra)	South Sudan and Uganda.
	Red-winged lark	Corypha hypermetra	Ethiopia, Kenya, Somalia, South Sudan, Tanzania, and Uganda.
	Highland lark	Corypha kurrae (split from C. africana)	Guinea to southwest Ivory Coast; central Nigeria to southeast Niger and west Chad; central north Cameroon; west Cameroon; and west Sudan.
	Rufous-naped lark	Corypha africana	Many parts of sub-Saharan Africa, with a very large but discontinuous range.
	Sentinel lark	Corypha athi (split from C. africana)	Kenya and Tanzania.
	Plains lark	Corypha kabalii (split from C. africana)	Gabon, Democratic Republic of the Congo, Angola, and northwest Zambia.
	Plateau lark	Corypha nigrescens (split from C. africana)	East Zambia, north Malawi, and south Tanzania.
	Russet lark	Corypha sharpii (split from C. africana)	Somalia.
	Somali lark	Corypha somalica	Endemic to Somalia.
