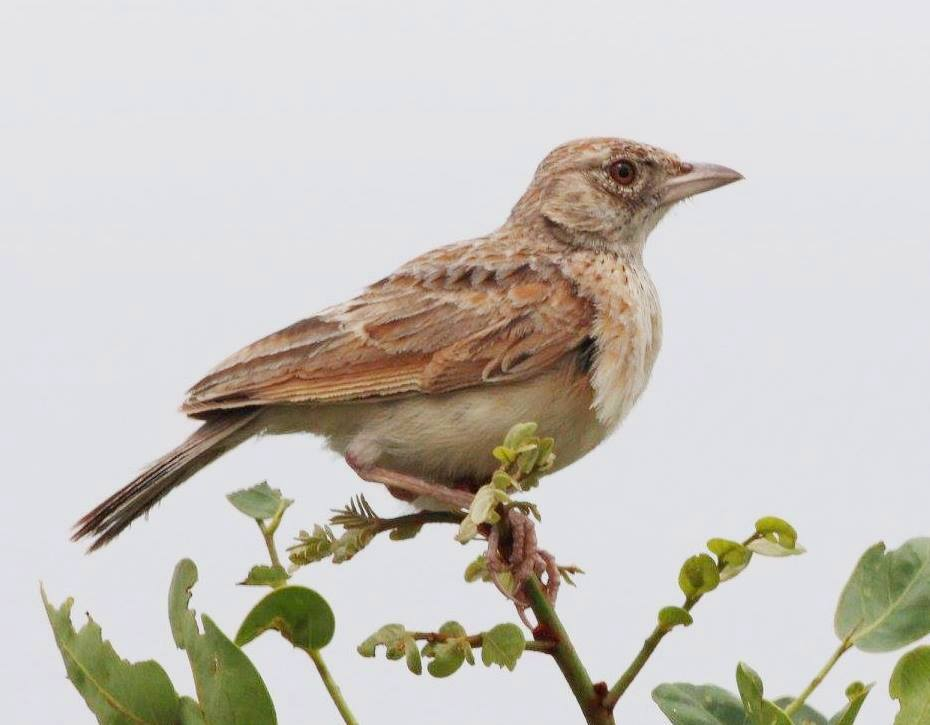
- Subspecies (Corypha kabalii irwini) in south-central Angola

Conservation status
- Not evaluated (IUCN 3.1)

Scientific classification
- Kingdom: Animalia
- Phylum: Chordata
- Class: Aves
- Order: Passeriformes
- Family: Alaudidae
- Genus: Corypha
- Species: C. kabalii

Binomial name
- Corypha kabalii (White, CMN, 1943)

= Plains lark =

Species of bird

The plains lark (Corypha kabalii) is a species of lark in the family Alaudidae found in Gabon, Democratic Republic of the Congo, Angola and northwest Zambia. It was formerly treated as a subspecies of the rufous-naped lark.

== Taxonomy ==
The plains lark was formally described in 1943 by the English ornithologist Charles M.N. White based on a specimen collected near Balovale (now the town of Zambezi) in northwest Zambia near the border with Angola. He considered it to be a subspecies of the rufous-naped lark and coined the trinomial name Mirafra africana kabalii. He chose the specific epithet to honour a local collector and hunter Kabali Muzeya. The plains lark is now treated as a separate species and placed in the genus Corypha. This is based on the results of two molecular phylogenetic studies by a team of ornithologists led by Per Alström that were published in 2023 and 2024.

Three subspecies are recognised:

- C. k. malbranti (Chapin, 1946) – Gabon to south DR Congo
- C. k. kabalii (White, CMN, 1943) – northeast Angola and northwest Zambia
- C. k. irwini (da Rosa Pinto, 1968) – southeast Angola (previously synonymized with C. africana pallida)
