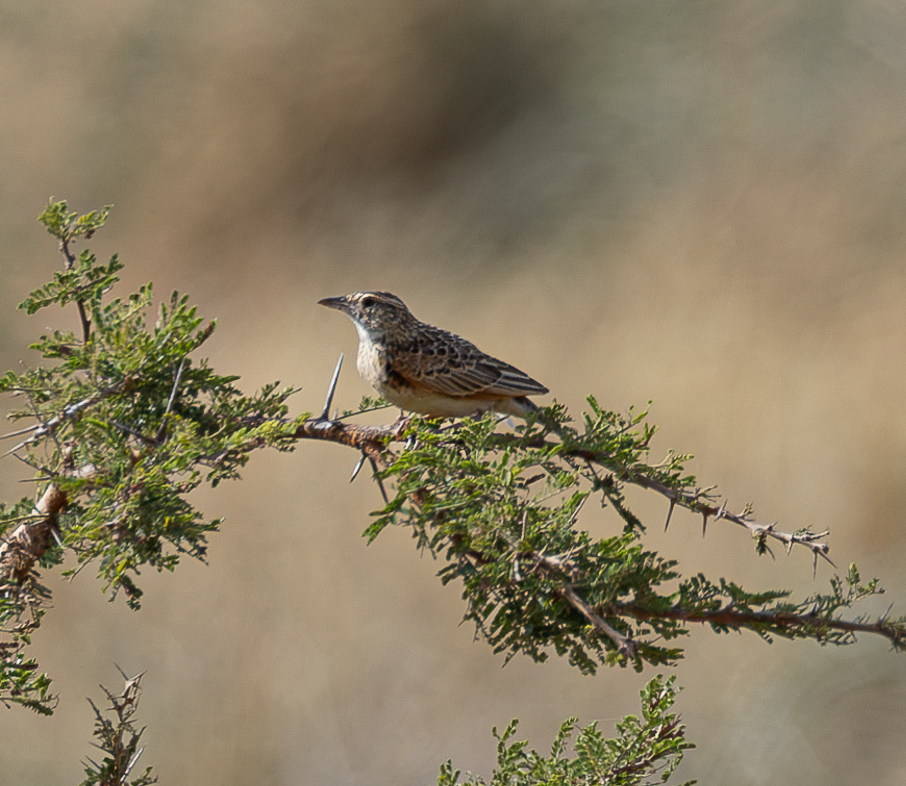

Conservation status
- Not evaluated (IUCN 3.1)

Scientific classification
- Kingdom: Animalia
- Phylum: Chordata
- Class: Aves
- Order: Passeriformes
- Family: Alaudidae
- Genus: Corypha
- Species: C. kidepoensis

Binomial name
- Corypha kidepoensis (Macdonald, 1940)

= Kidepo lark =

Species of bird

The Kidepo lark (Corypha kidepoensis) is a species of lark in the family Alaudidae found in South Sudan and Uganda. It was formerly treated as a subspecies of the red-winged lark.

== Taxonomy ==
The Kidepo lark was formally described in 1940 by the Scottish-Australian ornithologist James Macdonald based on a specimen that he had collected in southern South Sudan at Ero on the boundary of Didinga Hills with the plain of the Kidepo River. He considered it as a subspecies of the red-winged lark and coined the trinomial name Mirafra hypermetra kidepoensis. The Kidepo lark is now treated as a separate species and placed in the genus Corypha based on the results of molecular phylogenetic studies by a team of ornithologists led by Per Alström that were published in 2023 and 2024.

Two subspecies are recognised:

- C. k. kathangorensis (Cave, 1940) – southeast South Sudan
- C. k. kidepoensis (Macdonald, 1940) – south South Sudan and northeast Uganda
