= John Ash (ornithologist) =

English ornithologist (1925–2014)

John Sidney Ash (1925 – 2014) was an English ornithologist. He had a strong interest in the avifauna from the Horn of Africa, in particular Somalia, Eritrea and Ethiopia.

== Career ==
Ash was born in Gosforth, Northumberland on 26 May 1925 as son of Sidney and Kathleen Ash né Denley. In 1945, he graduated with a Bachelor of Science from the Newcastle wing of the University of Durham. He received the D.I.C. at the Imperial College London in 1948 and promoted there to Ph.D. in 1952. He was co-author of two fieldguides, The Birds of Somalia (with John E. Miskell) in 1998, and Birds of Ethiopia and Eritrea (with John Atkins) in 2009. Ash discovered several new bird taxa, including the Ankober serin (Serinus ankoberensis), Turdoides squamulata carolinae (a subspecies of the scaly babbler) which he named for his daughter Caroline, Hippolais pallida alulensis (a subspecies of the eastern olivaceous warbler), Acrocephalus scirpaceus avicenniae (a subspecies of the common reed warbler), the Ash's lark (Mirafra ashi) which was named after him by Peter Colston in 1982, and Ploceus victoriae, which is now thought to be a hybrid between the black-headed weaver and the northern brown-throated weaver. In May 1968, he co-discovered the Sidamo lark along with Christian Érard who described this species in 1975 but is now considered as conspecific with Archer's lark. He died on 6 January 2014. In November 1951, Ash married Jonquil Gudgeon, a zoologist, who died three days before him. The couple had one daughter, Caroline Penelope-Jane.
