= Highland lark =

Conservation status
- Not evaluated (IUCN 3.1)

Scientific classification
- Kingdom: Animalia
- Phylum: Chordata
- Class: Aves
- Order: Passeriformes
- Family: Alaudidae
- Genus: Corypha
- Species: C. kurrae

Binomial name
- Corypha kurrae (Lynes, 1923)

Species of bird

The highland lark (Corypha kurrae) is a species of small passerine bird in the lark family Alaudidae found in Africa from Guinea to west Sudan. It was formerly treated as a subspecies of the rufous-naped lark (Corypha africana).

== Taxonomy ==
The highland lark was formally described in 1923 by the British Admiral Hubert Lynes based on a specimen collected near Kurra in the Darfur region of southwest Sudan. He considered it to be a subspecies of the rufous-naped lark and coined the trinomial name Mirafra africana kurrae. The highland lark is now treated as a separate species and placed in the genus Corypha based on the results of two molecular phylogenetic studies by a team of ornithologists led by Per Alström that were published in 2023 and 2024.

Five subspecies are recognised:

- C. k. henrici (Bates, GL, 1930) – Guinea to southwest Ivory Coast
- C. k. batesi (Bannerman, 1923) – central Nigeria to southeast Niger and west Chad
- C. k. stresemanni (Bannerman, 1923) – central north Cameroon
- C. k. bamendae (Serle, 1959) – west Cameroon
- C. k. kurrae (Lynes, 1923) – west Sudan
