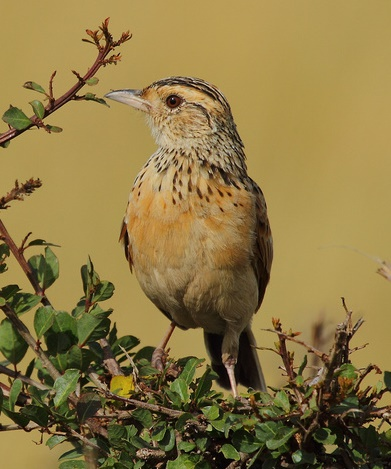

Conservation status
- Least Concern (IUCN 3.1)

Scientific classification
- Kingdom: Animalia
- Phylum: Chordata
- Class: Aves
- Order: Passeriformes
- Family: Alaudidae
- Genus: Corypha
- Species: C. hypermetra

Binomial name
- Corypha hypermetra (Reichenow, 1879)

Subspecies
- See text
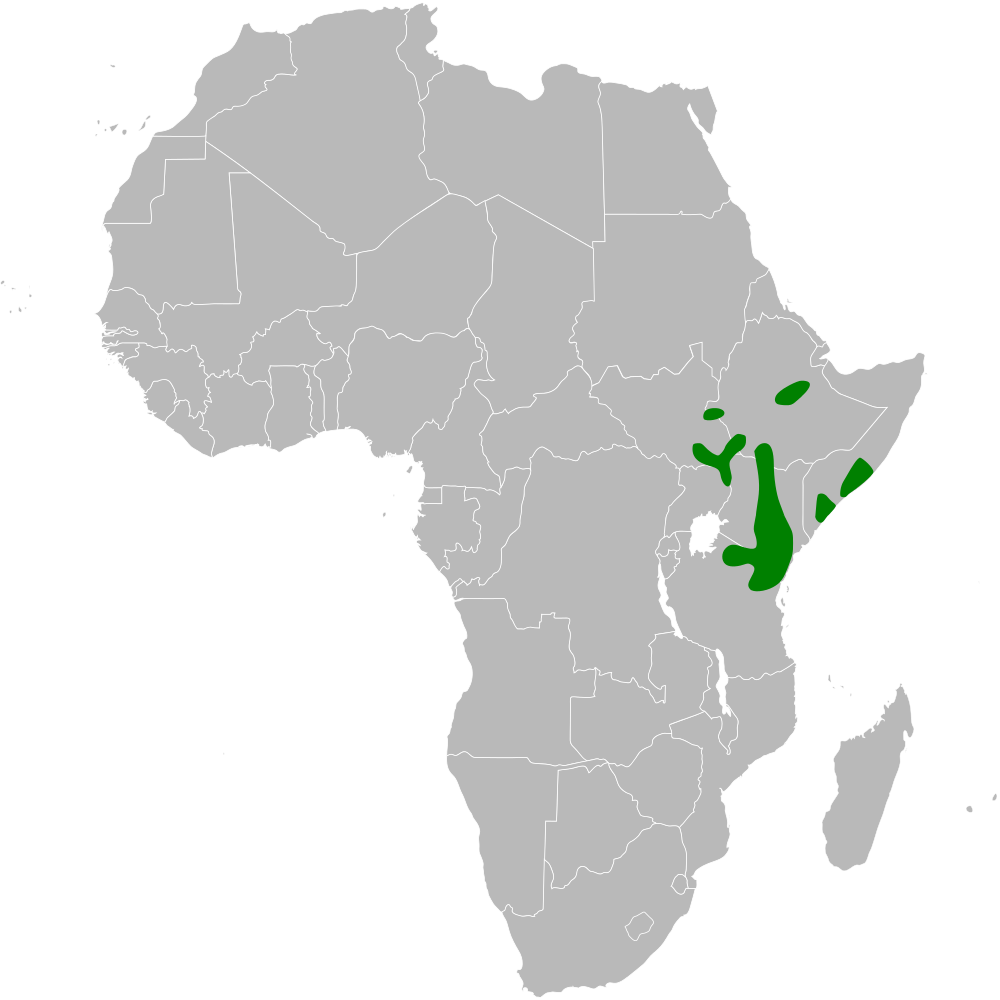
- resident range

Synonyms
- Spilocorydon hypermetrus

= Red-winged lark =

Species of bird

The red-winged lark (Corypha hypermetra) is a species of lark in the family Alaudidae found in eastern Africa. It was formerly treated as conspecific with the Kidepo lark.

== Taxonomy and systematics ==
The red-winged lark was formerly placed in the genus Mirafra. It is one of several species that were moved to the resurrected genus Corypha based on the results of a large molecular genetic study by the Swedish ornithologist Per Alström and collaborators that was published in 2023.

The red-winged lark is taken to form a species complex with the allopatric rufous-naped lark, and perhaps with the Somali lark. The name "red-winged lark" is sometimes used as an alternate name for the Indian bush lark. The alternate names red-winged bush lark and rufous-winged bush lark may also be used to describe the Indian bush lark or the Bengal bush lark respectively.

=== Subspecies ===
Two subspecies are recognized:

- C. h. gallarum (Hartert, EJO, 1907) – Ethiopia
- C. h. hypermetra (Reichenow, 1879) – south Somalia to northeast Tanzania

This species and the Kidepo lark (Corypha kidepoensis) were formerly treated as conspecific. The Kidepo lark was elevated to species status based on results of a comprehensive integrated study of the genus Corypha that was published in 2024.

== Description ==
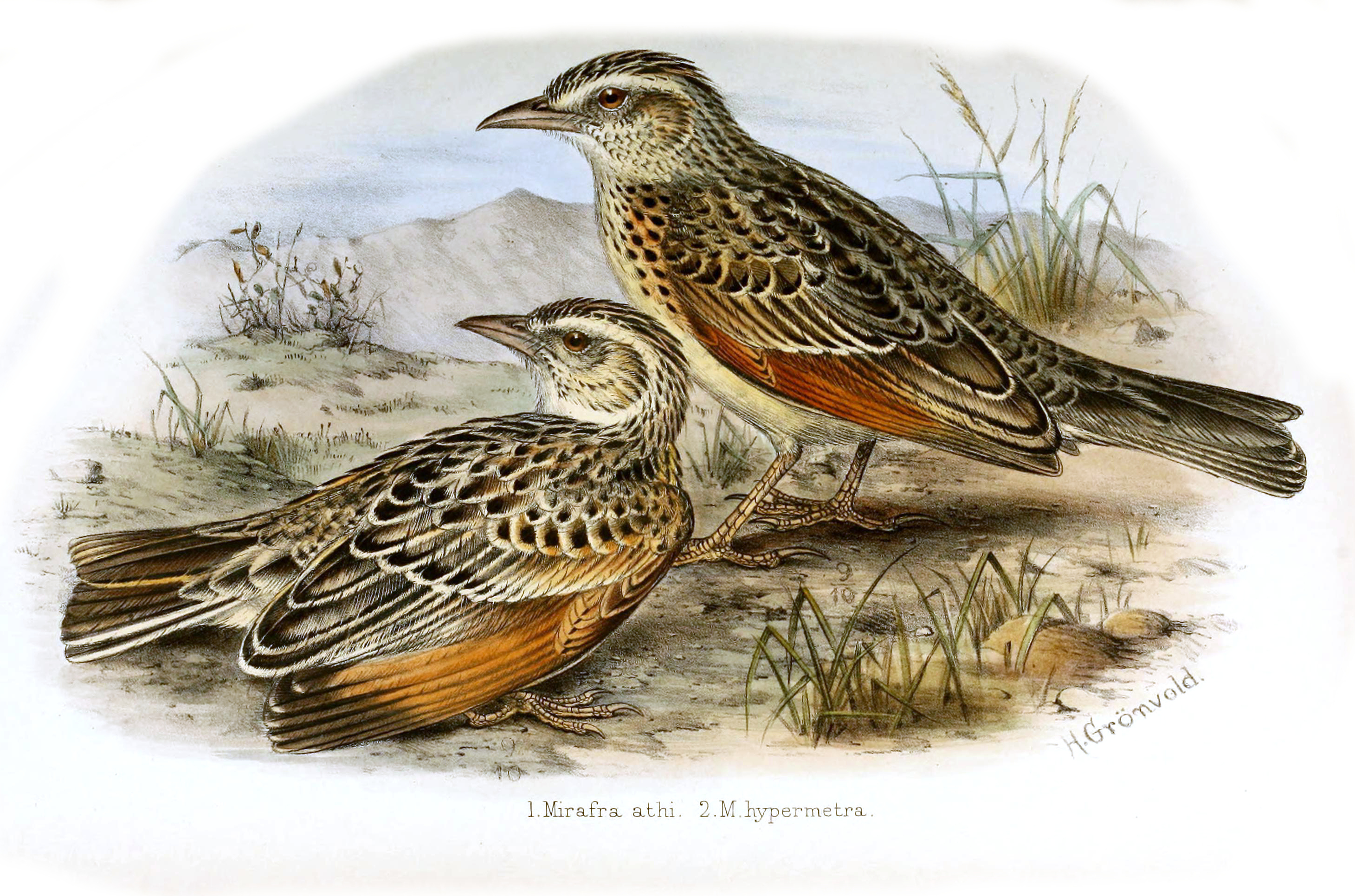
Rufous-naped (left) and Red-winged larks by Henrik Grønvold

It is a larger version of the rufous-naped lark, with a more robust bill and longer tail, but their morphological and vocal features do not intergrade where they occur together.

== Distribution and habitat ==
It has a patchy but quite extensive range in equatorial eastern Africa. It occurs within Ethiopia, Kenya, Somalia, South Sudan, Tanzania and Uganda, and its estimated global extent of occurrence is 660,000 km^{2}. Its total population has yet to be quantified, but is believed to be large.

Its natural habitat is savanna in tropical to subtropical dry, open, lowland.
