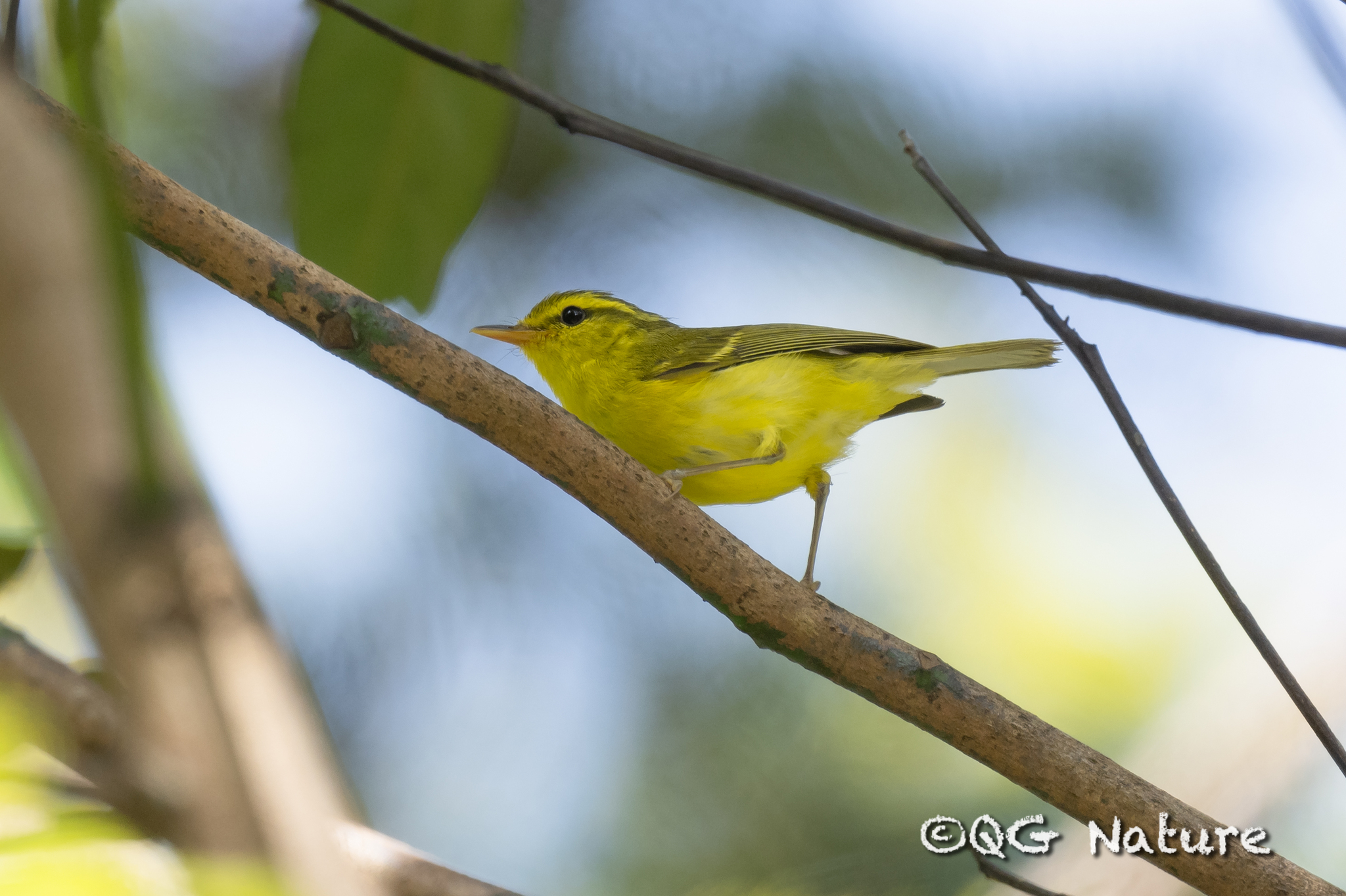

Conservation status
- Vulnerable (IUCN 3.1)

Scientific classification
- Kingdom: Animalia
- Phylum: Chordata
- Class: Aves
- Order: Passeriformes
- Family: Phylloscopidae
- Genus: Phylloscopus
- Species: P. hainanus

Binomial name
- Phylloscopus hainanus Olsson, Alström & Colston, 1993
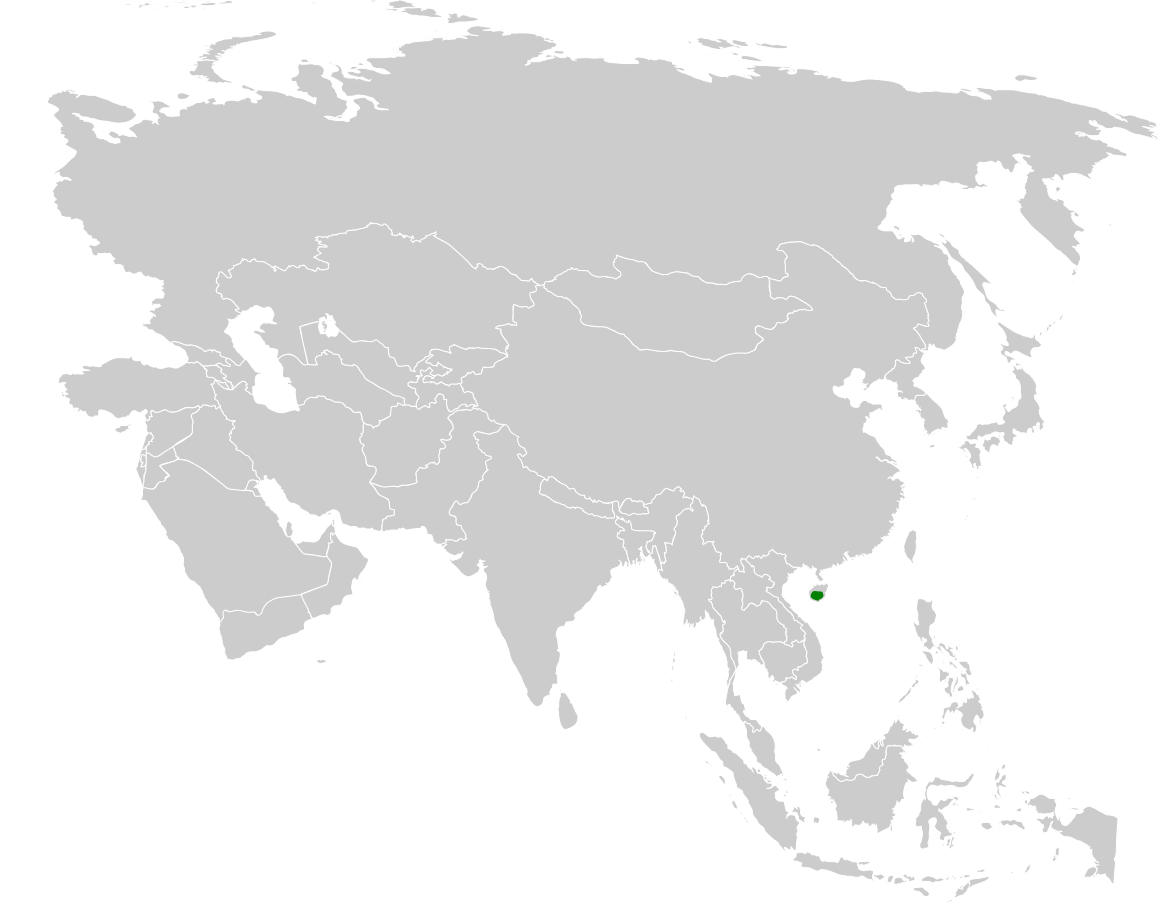

= Hainan leaf warbler =

Species of bird

The Hainan leaf warbler or Hainan leaf-warbler (Phylloscopus hainanus) is a species of Old World warbler in the family Phylloscopidae. It is endemic to mountains of southern Hainan Island, China.

Hainan leaf warbler inhabits primary, selectively logged, and secondary forest as well as scrub at elevations of 640–1,500 m (2,100–4,920 ft) above sea level. It might have previously inhabited also lowland forests, but very little of those remain. Although it can be locally common, the overall population is small (estimated at 1500–7000 mature individuals) and it is known from a small number of sites only. Moreover, it is threatened by habitat loss and fragmentation. It occurs in a number of protected areas.
