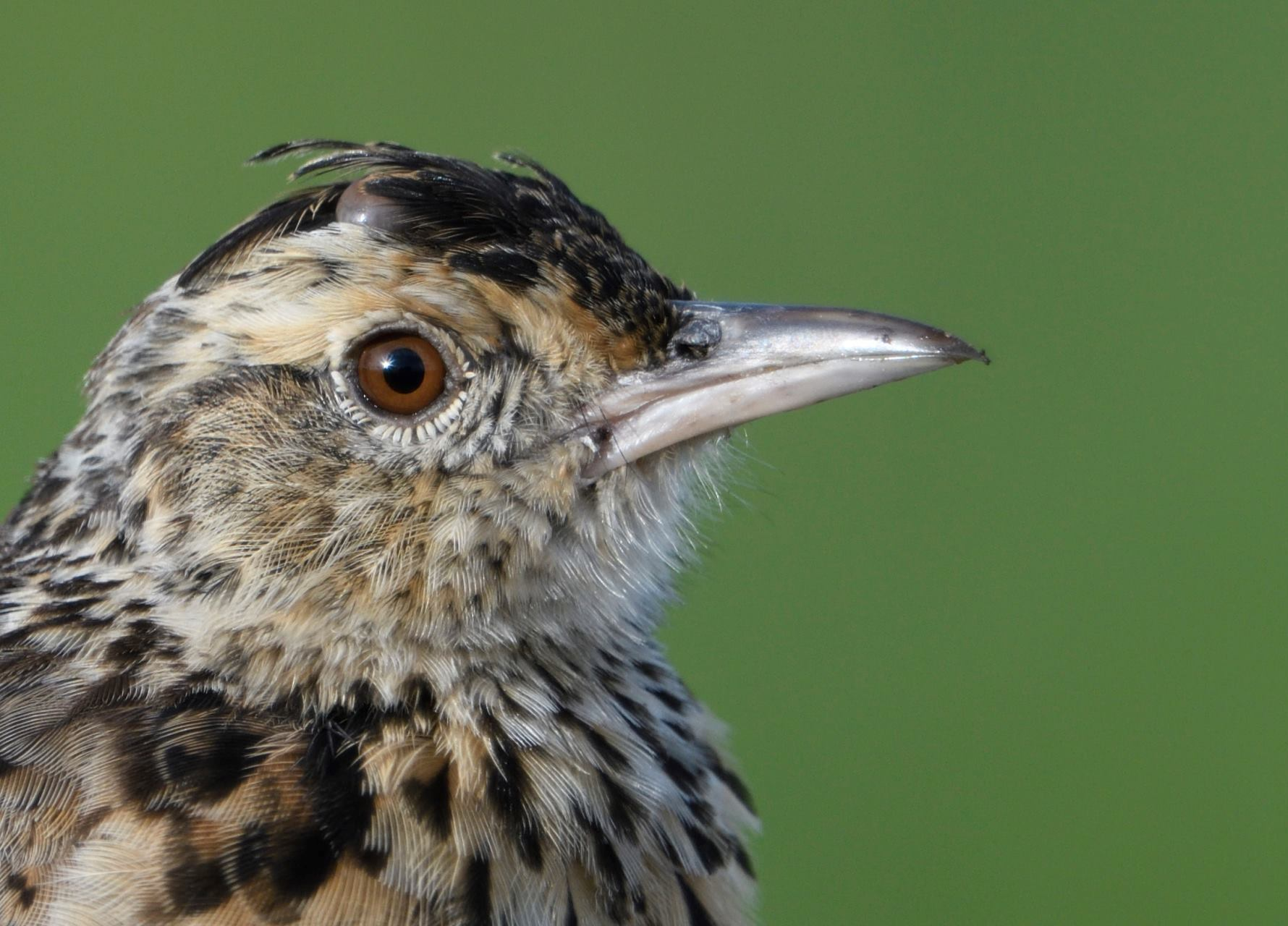
- In Kitulo National Park, Tanzania

Conservation status
- Not evaluated (IUCN 3.1)

Scientific classification
- Kingdom: Animalia
- Phylum: Chordata
- Class: Aves
- Order: Passeriformes
- Family: Alaudidae
- Genus: Corypha
- Species: C. nigrescens

Binomial name
- Corypha nigrescens (Reichenow, 1900)

= Plateau lark =

Species of bird

The plateau lark (Corypha nigrescens) is a species of lark in the family Alaudidae found in east Zambia, north Malawi and south Tanzania. It was formerly treated as a subspecies of the rufous-naped lark.

== Taxonomy ==
The plateau lark was formally described in 1900 by the German ornithologist Anton Reichenow based on a specimen collected in Tanzania north of Lake Malawi on the Kitulo Plateau. He considered it to be a subspecies of the rufous-naped lark and coined the trinomial name Mirafra africana nigrescens. The specific epithet is from Latin nigrescens, nigrescentis meaning "blackish". The plateau lark is now treated as a separate species and placed in the genus Corypha. This is based on the results of two molecular phylogenetic studies by a group of ornithologists led by Per Alström that were published in 2023 and 2024.

Two subspecies are recognised:

- C. n. nigrescens (Reichenow, 1900) – northeast Zambia and south Tanzania
- C. n. nyikae (Benson, 1939) – east Zambia, north Malawi and southwest Tanzania
