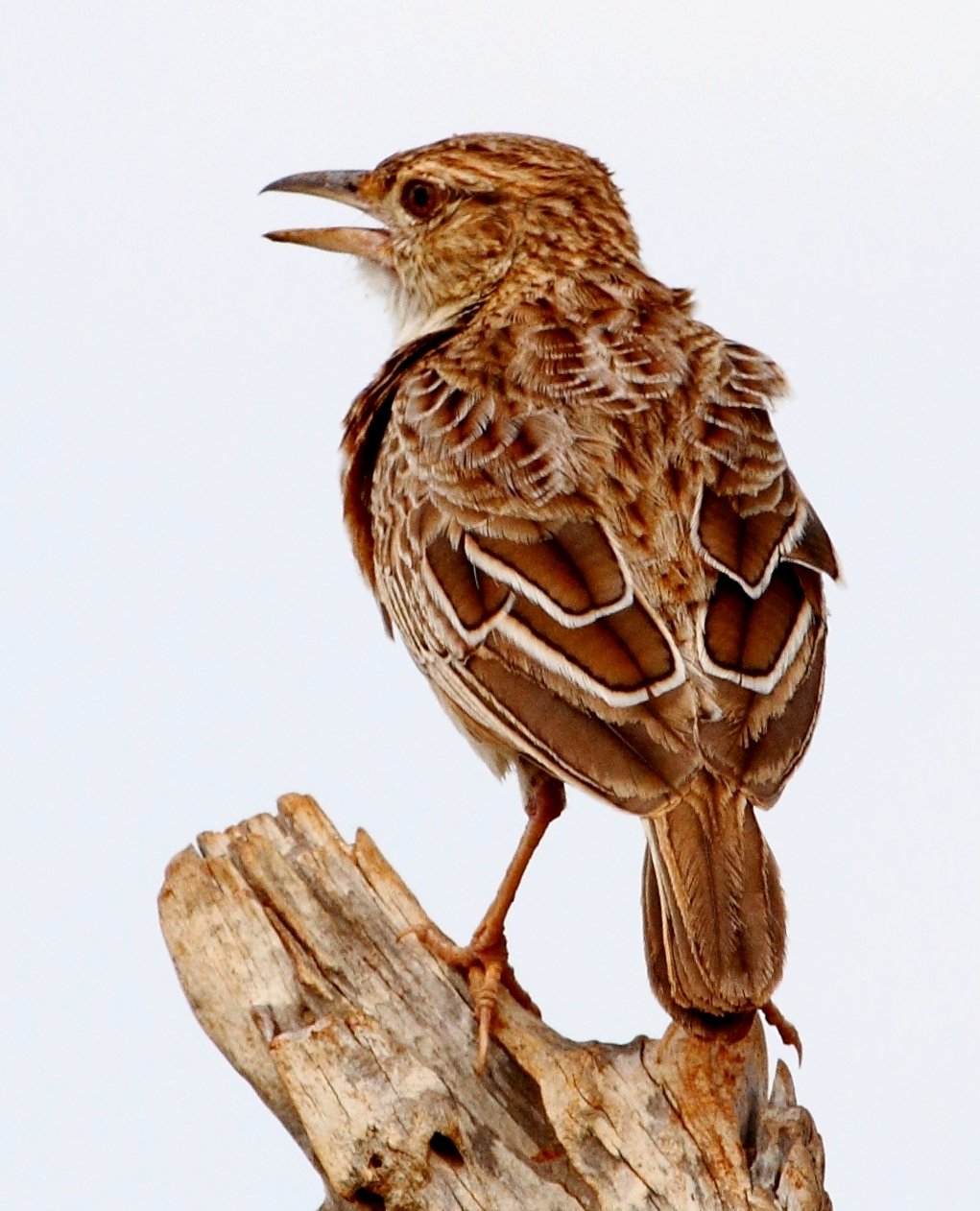
- Subspecies Corypha athi harterti in Tsavo East, Kenya

Conservation status
- Not evaluated (IUCN 3.1)

Scientific classification
- Kingdom: Animalia
- Phylum: Chordata
- Class: Aves
- Order: Passeriformes
- Family: Alaudidae
- Genus: Corypha
- Species: C. athi

Binomial name
- Corypha athi (Hartert, 1900)

= Sentinel lark =

Species of bird

The sentinel lark (Corypha athi) is a species of lark in the family Alaudidae found in Kenya and Tanzania. It was formerly treated as a subspecies of the rufous-naped lark.

== Taxonomy ==
The sentinel lark was formally described in 1900 by the German ornithologist Ernst Hartert based on a specimen collected on the plains of the Athi River in Kenya. He considered it to be a subspecies of the rufous-naped lark and coined the trinomial name Mirafra africana athi. The sentinel lark is now treated as a separate species and placed in the genus Corypha. This placement is based on the results of two molecular phylogenetic studies by a team of ornithologists led by Per Alström that were published in 2023 and 2024.

Two subspecies are recognised:

- C. a. athi (Hartert, EJO, 1900) – central Kenya to northeast Tanzania
- C. a. harterti (Neumann, 1908) – central south Kenya
