= Rufous winged bush lark =

Rufous winged bush lark may refer to:

- Red-winged lark, a species of lark found in eastern Africa
- Bengal bush lark, a species of lark found in South Asia
