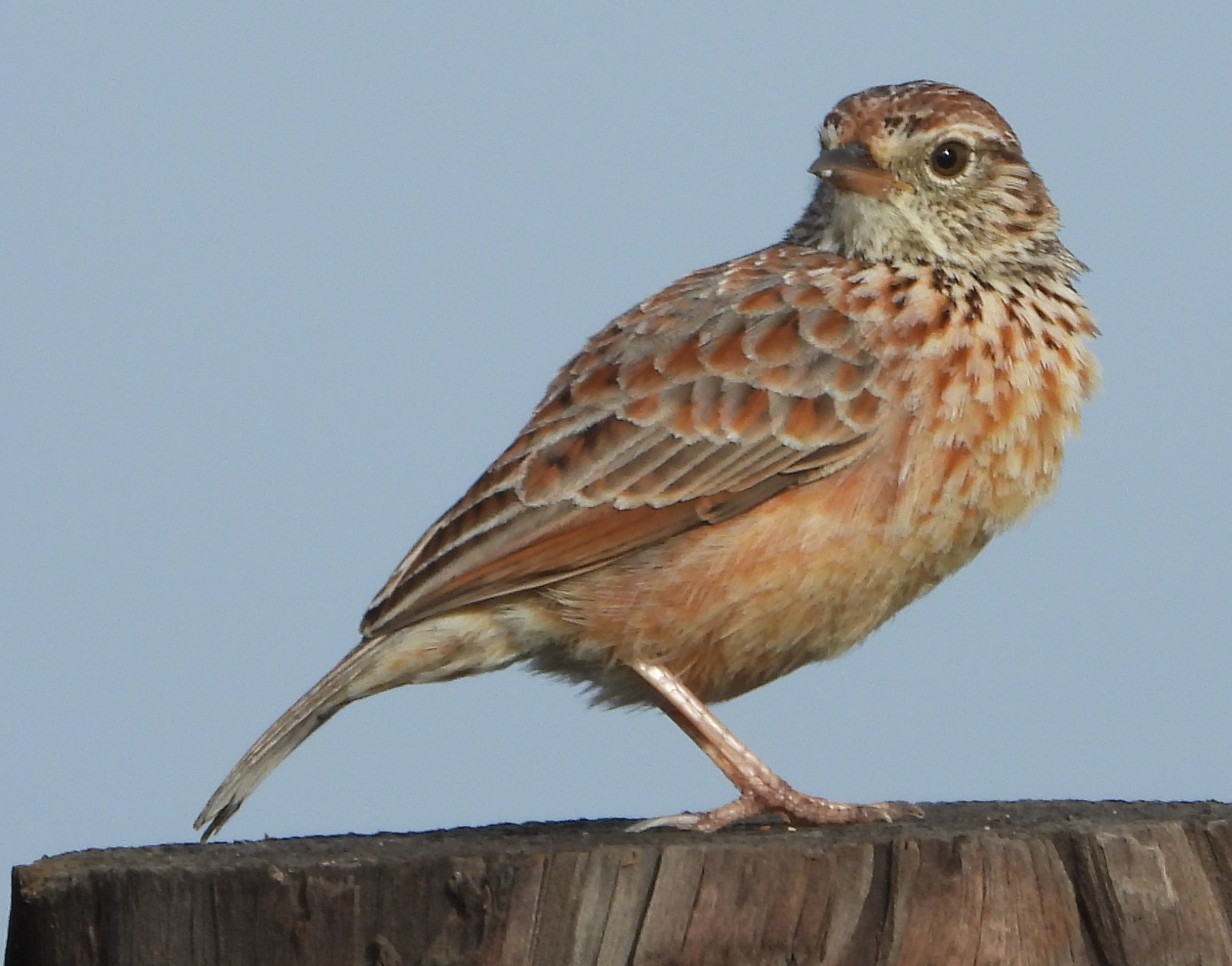
- near Aurora, Western Cape

Conservation status
- Least Concern (IUCN 3.1)

Scientific classification
- Kingdom: Animalia
- Phylum: Chordata
- Class: Aves
- Order: Passeriformes
- Family: Alaudidae
- Genus: Corypha
- Species: C. apiata

Binomial name
- Corypha apiata (Vieillot, 1816)

Subspecies
- See text
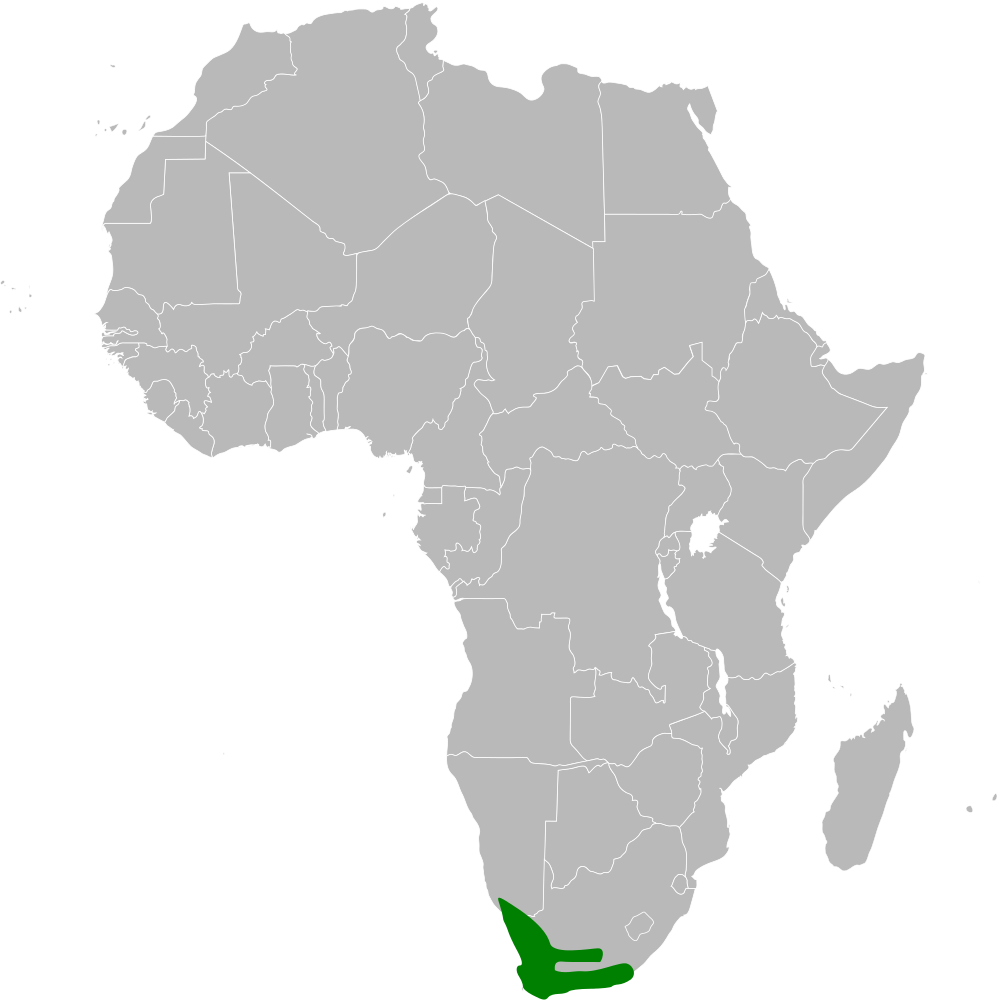
- resident range

Synonyms
- Alauda apiata; Mirafra batesi; Mirafra damarensis; Mirafra hewitti

= Cape clapper lark =

Species of bird

The Cape clapper lark (Corypha apiata) is a small passerine bird which breeds in southern Africa. It derives its name from the wing clapping which forms part of the display flight. The Cape clapper lark is a species of open grassland and savannah, also inhabiting karoo, fynbos and fallow agricultural land.

== Taxonomy ==
The Cape clapper lark was originally placed in the genus Alauda. This species and the Eastern clapper lark were formerly considered conspecific as the clapper lark (M. apiata) until split in 2009. The Cape clapper lark and the Eastern clapper lark are regarded as forming a superspecies with the flappet lark, which is found further to the north. Bar-tailed lark is another alternate name for the Cape clapper lark.

The Cape clapper lark was formerly placed in the genus Mirafra. It is one of several species that were moved to the resurrected genus Corypha based on the results of a large molecular genetic study by the Swedish ornithologist Per Alström and collaborators that was published in 2023.

=== Subspecies ===
Two subspecies are recognised:

- C. a. apiata (Vieillot, 1816) – southwest Namibia and west South Africa
- C. a. marjoriae (Winterbottom, 1956) – southwest South Africa

== Description ==
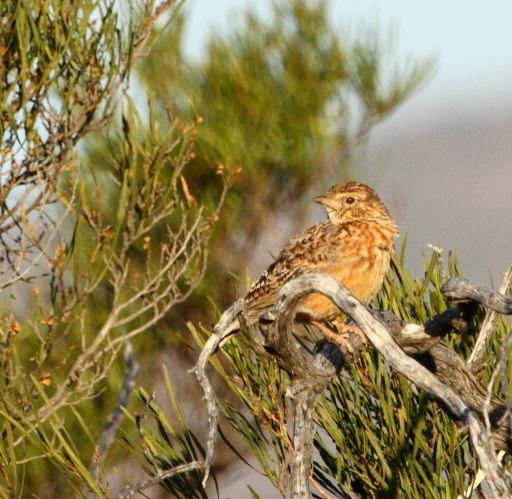
At Namaqua National Park

This lark is a 15 cm long bird, with a brown crown, rich rufous underparts, and a strong bill. The Cape clapper lark has grey upperparts and a grey face, and the Agulhas clapper lark has dark brown upperparts, although individual variation means that it cannot always be reliably distinguished from the nominate race.

The display commences with an ascending flight with wing flapping. The Cape clapper lark has a slower wing clap compared to the Eastern clapper lark, and its otherwise similar call is longer and rises in pitch more. The Agulhas clapper lark has a fast wing clap, and a descending double whistled "peeeooo" call.

== Behaviour ==
The Cape clapper lark is a skulking species and difficult to find when not displaying. It is not gregarious, and individuals tend to be seen in dry habitats feeding on the ground on seeds and insects.
