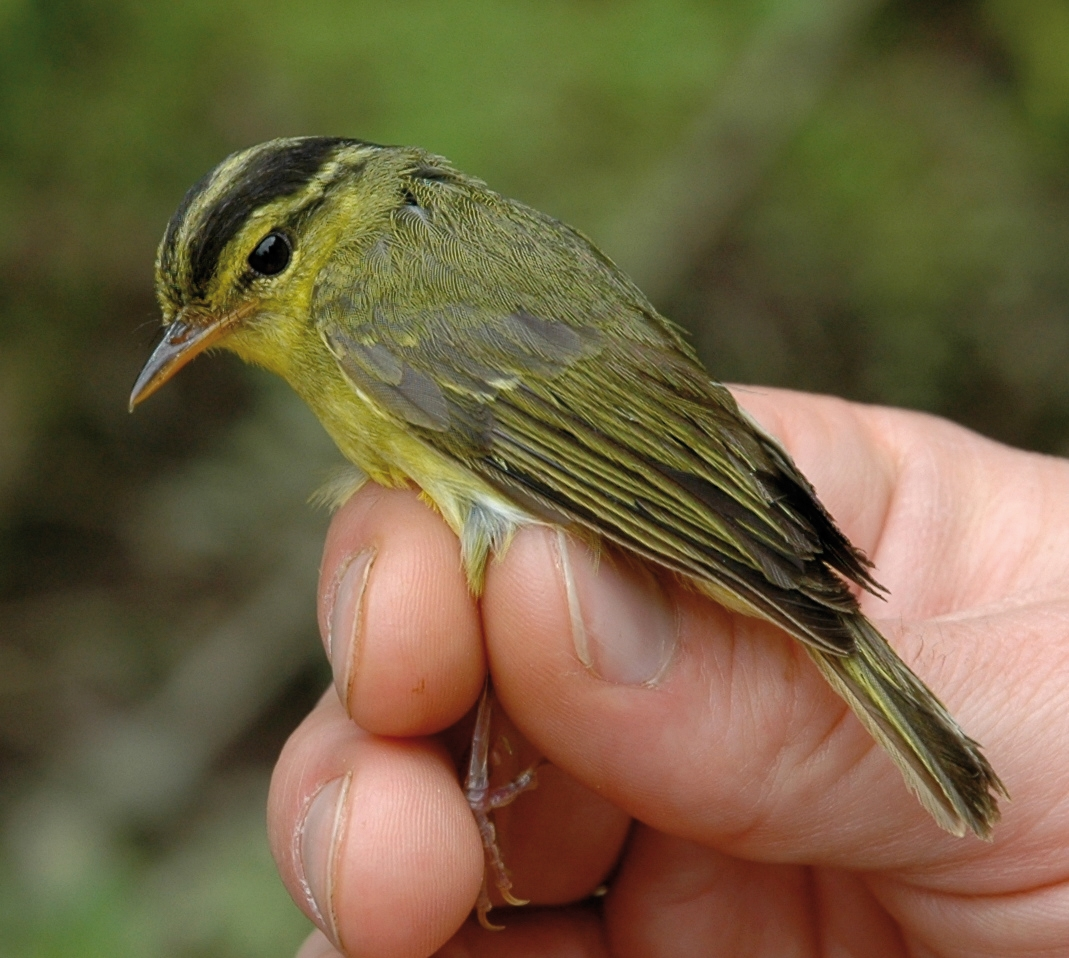

Conservation status
- Least Concern (IUCN 3.1)

Scientific classification
- Kingdom: Animalia
- Phylum: Chordata
- Class: Aves
- Order: Passeriformes
- Family: Phylloscopidae
- Genus: Phylloscopus
- Species: P. calciatilis

Binomial name
- Phylloscopus calciatilis Alström, Davidson, PJ, Duckworth, Eames, JC, Trai Trong Le, Nguyen Cu, Olsson, Robson & Timmins, 2009

= Limestone leaf warbler =

Species of bird

The limestone leaf warbler (Phylloscopus calciatilis) is a species of warbler in the family Phylloscopidae. When this species was first seen, beginning in 1994, it was mistaken for the similar sulphur-breasted warbler. It is smaller than the sulphur-breasted warbler, and has more rounded wings. The plumage is almost identical, with comparisons showing only a slightly colder yellow below and a greyer tinge above. Although smaller, the bill is proportionally larger than that of the sulphur-breasted warbler. Accurate measurements are not available; the holotype has a wing length of 5.2 cm (2.0 in); the paratype a tail length of 3.7 cm (1.5 in) and a bill length of 1.39 cm (0.55 in). The species is known to occur in northern Vietnam and Laos, and potentially also occurs in southern China as well. The species name, calciatilis, means "dwelling on limestone", which along with its common name is a reference to its natural habitat, which is broadleaved evergreen and semi-evergreen forest growing around limestone karst mountains. The bare-faced bulbul, described in 2009, was found in the karst of the same region.

== Description ==
The limestone leaf warbler (Phylloscopus calciatilis) is smaller than the sulphur-breasted warbler (Phylloscopus ricketti) and has more rounded wings and a proportionately elongated bill. Although a smaller species, the bill is proportionately larger than that of the sulphur-breasted warbler. The plumage is nearly identical, with only a slightly lighter yellow below a grey tinge. Comparisons between these two species suggest it is doubtful that they can be reliably distinguished by plumage alone. The holotype has a wing length of 5.2 cm; in the paratype a tail length of 3.7 cm and a bill length of 1.39 cm.

The limestone leaf warbler is greenish-olive in colour with a yellow breast and striped crown. Although it looks similar to other warblers, it can be distinguished by being smaller, having shorter wings, and a larger bill. It is also distinguished by its black lateral crown-stripes, which are paler and more diffuse near the bill. The median crown stripe is greenish-yellow with the supercilium being yellow with a faint greenish tinge. The eye-stripe on lores and upper ear-coverts are a well defined black colour with a green tinge. The mantle, scapulars, back, rump, lesser and uppertail-coverts are a bright grey-green colour, with the throat, breast and belly a bright yellow. The sides of the breast have a green tinge. The remiges, rectrices, alula, medium, greater and primary coverts are a dark grey colour with a brown tinge, with bright greyish-green outer edges. The juvenile resembles the adults, but has looser, fluffier plumage and, possibly as a result of this, slightly less yellow underparts. It has marginally whiter and more clear-cut pale tips to the greater coverts, and probably slightly more green on the anterior part of the lateral crown-stripes.

“In plumage, the limestone leaf warbler appears to be largely indistinguishable from P. ricketti, although as a result of the small number of specimens available for the limestone leaf warbler and their poor quality, detailed comparisons are difficult to make. The only two specimens of the limestone leaf warbler, which have been directly compared with a series of P. ricketti are marginally colder yellow below a more greyish tinge above, and show marginally greyer lateral crown-stripes than P. ricketti. The limestone leaf warbler is easily separable from P. cantator by its yellow belly”.

== Taxonomy ==
Based on mitochondrial and nuclear DNA, the new species is most closely related to the sulphur-breasted warbler and is thought to be the sister of the yellow-vented warbler (Phylloscopus cantator). The mitochondrial divergences between these three species don't vary as greatly as those found in other species of Phylloscopus and Seicercus warblers.

Alstrom et al. (2010) reported the discovery of limestone leaf warbler in 1994 and belongs to the same lineage as the sulphur-breasted warbler and the yellow-vented warbler. It is allopatric or parapatric to these two species and may hybridize with the sulphur-breasted warbler. Its call and song are diagnostic and its identity is easily confirmed by mitochondrial and nuclear DNA. Molecular evidence suggests that it is the sister species of the yellow-vented warbler. The warbler genus Phylloscopus includes species throughout Eurasia and less so in Africa. Studies of vocalisations and DNA over the last 20 years have increased the number of recognised warbler species by 40% to 64.

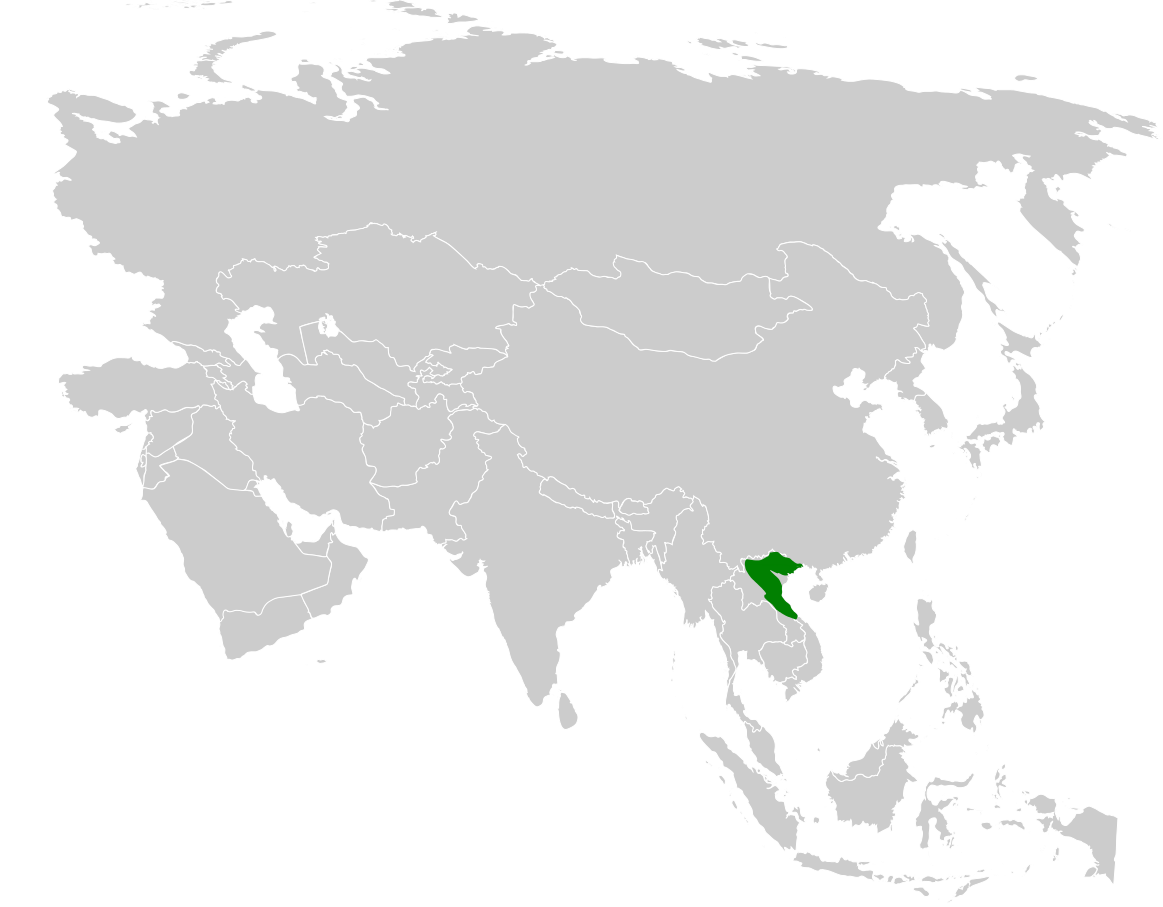
Global distribution

== Habitat ==
The species name, calciatilis, means “dwelling on limestone”, which along with its common name is a reference to its natural habitat, which is broadleaved evergreen and semi-evergreen forest growing around limestone karst mountains.

At Phong Nha-Ke Bang it was only found in the forest on the mountains or, uncommonly, in valleys between karsts, frequently on steep slopes, between 80m and at least 200m; it was never encountered in the forest in the plains away from the hills. At Hin Namno National Protected Area it was found in old-growth and mature secondary semi-evergreen forest on limestone karst, between 280 and 460m. Most records came from taller forest that was generally restricted to valley floors in limestone karst. In the Nadi and Sayphou Loyang areas, Laos, it was found in dry evergreen and semi-evergreen forest and secondary growth on limestone over 600–1000 m. In the Thai An Commune, Ha Giang, it was observed in tall secondary scrub on a well-vegetated slope with a karst landscape at approximately 1200 m.

Named limestone leaf warbler because it breeds in Laos's limestone karst environments – a region known for unusual wildlife – it is similar to other warblers in this area of S.E. Asia except for its distinct vocalisations and slight morphological differences. “The discovery of this new species is very exciting and underscores the importance of this region of Indochina for conservation”, said Colin Poole, Executive Director of the Asia Program for the Wildlife Conservation Society. “With increased attention from biologists, the Annamite mountain range of Laos in particular is revealing itself as a lost world for new and unusual wildlife.”

== Threats ==
Scientists presume there are many limestone warblers in this region; however, its habitat contains threats. Many parts of the species' native forests have been cleared for wood collection. WCS is continuing to work with the Lao Government in an effort to reduce the threat to this bird and other wildlife in the area.

The conservation of the limestone leaf warbler depends on its habitat rather than being hunted, due to its small size. There are large areas of karst within its known range, and the area it inhabits is generally unsuitable for industrial agriculture or any other type of land conversion. However, some parts of the karst blocks are being cleared for timber, which reduces the extent and quality of forest patches. If the species is dependent on taller forests within karst areas, its population may decline. However, Laos still has large areas of reasonably tall forest remaining within the limestone karst formations.
