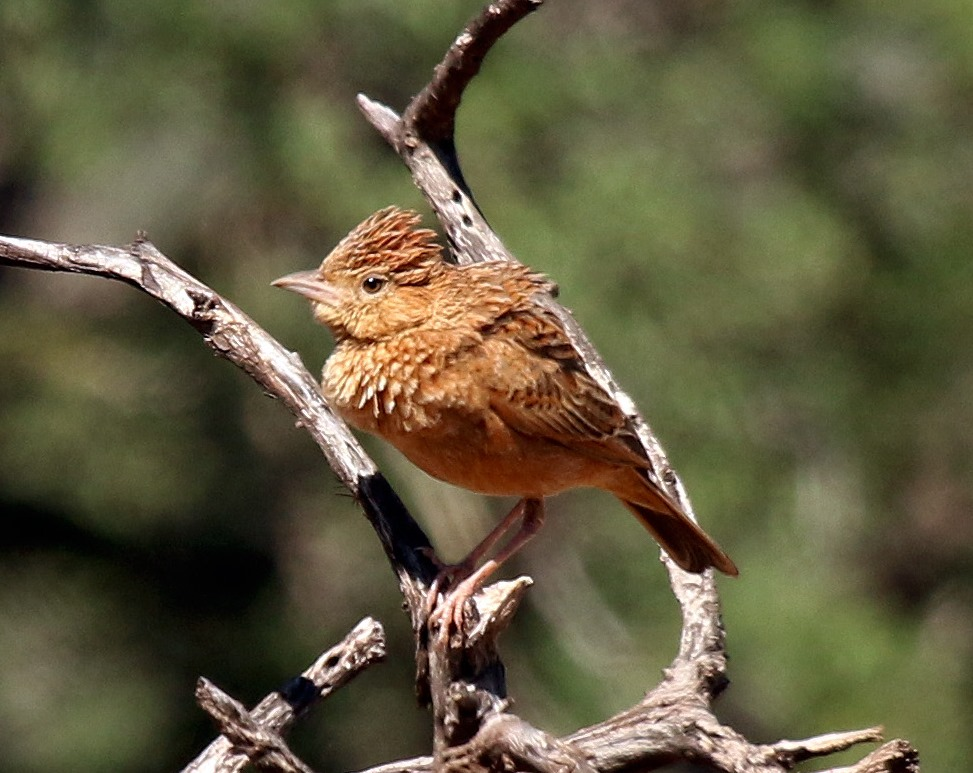
- M. f. subsp. fasciolata at Tswalu Kalahari Reserve, South Africa

Conservation status
- Least Concern (IUCN 3.1)

Scientific classification
- Kingdom: Animalia
- Phylum: Chordata
- Class: Aves
- Order: Passeriformes
- Family: Alaudidae
- Genus: Corypha
- Species: C. fasciolata

Binomial name
- Corypha fasciolata (Sundevall, 1850)
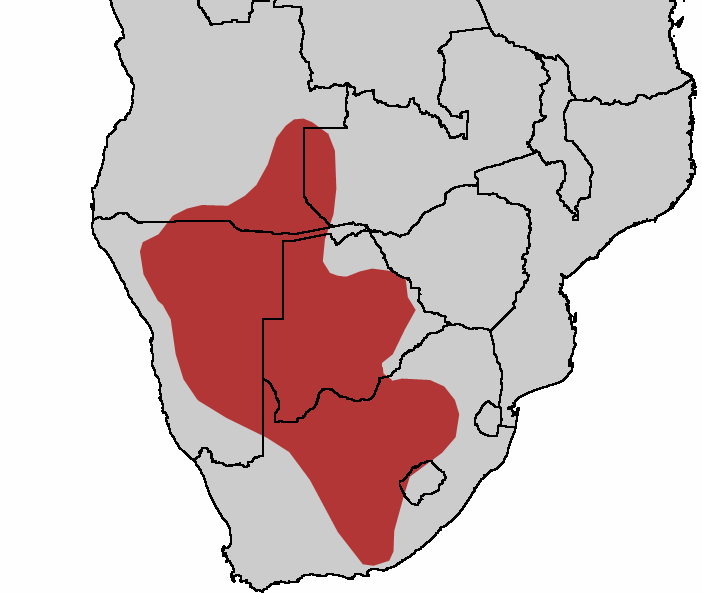
- resident range

Synonyms
- Alauda fasciolata; Mirafra damarensis

= Eastern clapper lark =

Species of bird

The eastern clapper lark (Corypha fasciolata) is a small passerine bird which breeds in southern Africa. It derives its name from the wing clapping which forms part of its display flight.

== Taxonomy and systematics ==
The eastern clapper lark was formerly placed in the genus Mirafra. It is one of several species that were moved to the resurrected genus Corypha based on the results of a large molecular genetic study by the Swedish ornithologist Per Alström and collaborators that was published in 2023.

This species and the Cape clapper lark were formerly considered conspecific as the "clapper lark" (M. apiata) until split based on genetic analysis. The eastern clapper lark and the Cape clapper lark are regarded as forming a superspecies with the flappet lark (Amirafra rufocinnamomea), which is found further to the north.

=== Subspecies ===
Five subspecies are recognised:

- C. f. reynoldsi (Benson & Irwin, 1965) – north Namibia, north Botswana and southwest Zambia
- C. f. jappi (Traylor, 1962) – west Zambia
- C. f. nata (Smithers, 1955) – northeast Botswana
- C. f. damarensis (Sharpe, 1875) – north, central Namibia and west, central Botswana
- C. f. fasciolata (Sundevall, 1850) – central south Botswana and north, central South Africa

== Description ==
This lark is a 15-cm-long bird, with a brown crown, rich rufous underparts, and a strong bill. It has brown upperparts (greyer in the north of its range). Its call is an ascending "pooooeeeee".

== Distribution and habitat ==
The eastern clapper lark is found in much of the drier parts of southern Africa in Zambia, Namibia, Botswana, Lesotho and South Africa. It is a species of open grassland and savannah.

== Behaviour and ecology ==
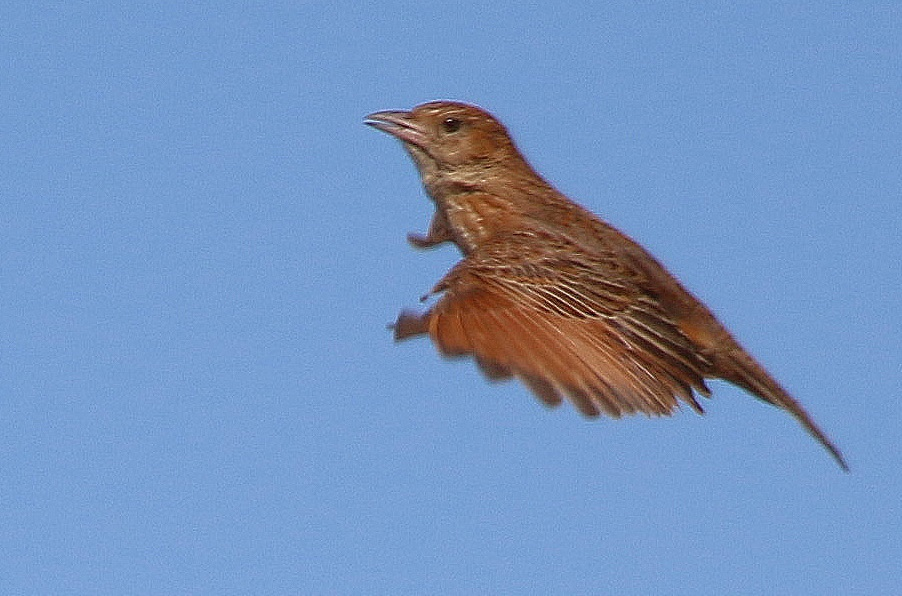
Wing clapping during the ascent of the short display flight

The eastern clapper lark is a skulking species, difficult to find when not displaying. It is not gregarious, and individuals tend to be seen in dry habitats feeding on the ground on seeds and insects. The display commences with an ascending flight with wing flapping. It then parachutes down with trailing legs.
