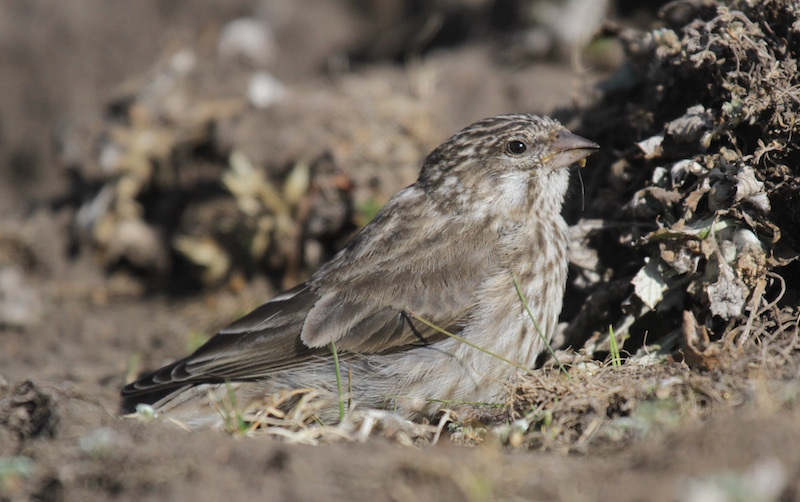

Conservation status
- Vulnerable (IUCN 3.1)

Scientific classification
- Kingdom: Animalia
- Phylum: Chordata
- Class: Aves
- Order: Passeriformes
- Family: Fringillidae
- Subfamily: Carduelinae
- Genus: Crithagra
- Species: C. ankoberensis

Binomial name
- Crithagra ankoberensis (Ash, 1979)

Synonyms
- Serinus ankoberensis

= Ankober serin =

Species of bird

The Ankober serin (Crithagra ankoberensis) is a species of finch in the family Fringillidae. It is a small brown seedeater, about 12 centimeters or 5 inches in length with brown upperparts and its head and breast distinguished with heavy buffy-colored streaking. It is gregarious and is often encountered in flocks. Its song consists of a constant, low twitter.

This bird is endemic to Ethiopia, inhabiting steep rocky slopes and high cliff-tops; the reported range of the Ankober serin consists of several disjointed areas in northern Shewa and in the northern Amhara Region. It is threatened by habitat loss.

The Ankober serin was formerly placed in the genus Serinus but phylogenetic analysis using mitochondrial and nuclear DNA sequences found that the genus was polyphyletic. The genus was therefore split and a number of species including the Ankober serin were moved to the resurrected genus Crithagra.
