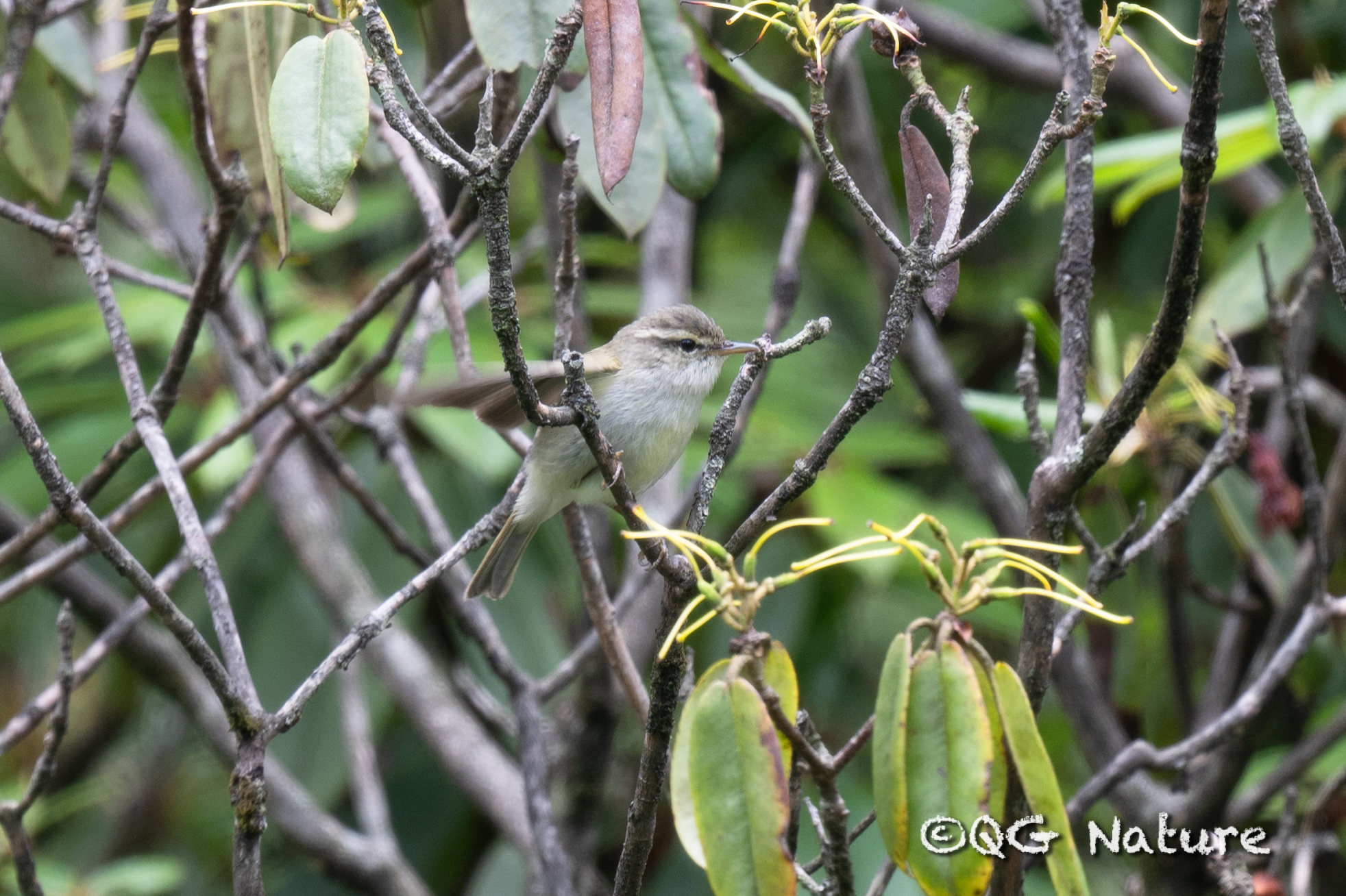

Conservation status
- Least Concern (IUCN 3.1)

Scientific classification
- Kingdom: Animalia
- Phylum: Chordata
- Class: Aves
- Order: Passeriformes
- Family: Phylloscopidae
- Genus: Phylloscopus
- Species: P. emeiensis

Binomial name
- Phylloscopus emeiensis Alström & Olsson, 1995

= Emei leaf warbler =

Species of bird

The Emei leaf warbler (Phylloscopus emeiensis) is a species of leaf warbler (family Phylloscopidae). It was formerly included in the "Old World warbler" assemblage.

It breeds in China, and it is vagrant in Myanmar.

== Taxonomy and systematics ==
The relationships are uncertain, but a study based on the mitochondrial cytochrome b and 12S and nuclear myoglobin intron 2 revealed no evidence for a close relationship to the morphologically similar Blyth's leaf warbler P. reguloides complex.

== Description ==
The Emei leaf warbler is a small passerine, measuring 11–12 cm (4.3–4.7 in) in length. Its crown is greyish-green, slightly darker at rear than in front, with a pale median crown-stripe that is poorly marked in front, and slightly but noticeably broader, paler and more distinct at rear. It has a prominent pale yellowish-tinged supercilium and a distinct dark eye-stripe; the rest of ear-coverts are paler, with faint dark mottling. Its upperparts are dull green, clearly paler than the sides of its crown and eye-stripe. The wings and tail are primarily greenish, with distinct pale yellowish tips to the median coverts and broad pale yellowish tips to greater coverts, forming two prominent wing-bars. Its outermost tail-feather has a whitish edge measuring less than 0.5 mm (0.02 in) on the inner web and an indistinctly paler tip; the second outermost tail-feather has an even less distinct pale inner edge and tip. The bird's underside is whitish, indistinctly streaked with pale yellowish, and with slightly more yellowish undertail-coverts. Its iris is dark brown. Its upper mandible is blackish while the lower is pale orange. The tarsus, toes and claws are pinkish-grey, but the tarsus is slightly paler than the toes and claws. The Emei leaf warbler is very similar to the sympatric Claudia's leaf warbler, but differs mainly in having a less contrasting crown pattern, with lighter lateral crown-stripes and a darker median crown-stripe. The Emei leaf warbler's estimated generation length is 3.6 years.

== Distribution ==
Breeds locally in Sichuan, Yunnan, Guizhou and Guangdong provinces, China and has recently been found to breed also in Shaanxi province, China. Appears on the breeding grounds in the latter part of April. One non-breeding record from southeast Myanmar. Number of mature individuals: No available data, but not known to be numerous anywhere.

== Habitat ==
The Emei leaf warbler breeds in temperate deciduous broadleaved forest, sometimes with some spruce, Picea or Abies. It has been found to favour a mix of old secondary and replanted broadleaved forest, with lower densities in primary broadleaved forest. It has been recorded at 1000–2200 m in the breeding season.

== Behavior ==
=== Diet ===
Though the Emei leaf warbler is known to eat insects, there are currently no studies to support that claim.

=== Breeding ===
Based on male singing activity, the breeding period presumably begins in the mid of to the late of April. However, there is no data to support that hypothesis.

=== Vocalization ===
The song is a clear, slightly quivering, straight trill between about 4 and 6 kHz, usually lasting 3–4 seconds. Every male displays several verse types; up to eight have been recorded from a single individual. The song is very different from those of the sympatric Claudia's leaf warbler and Kloss's leaf warbler. The call is a soft tu-du-du, tu-du, or tu-du-du-du, somewhat resembling one of the calls of European greenfinch, but clearly different from the calls of Claudia's and Kloss's leaf warblers.

== Etymology ==
The genus name Phylloscopus means "leaf gleaning" and the species name emeiensis refers to the mount Emei, where the species was first discovered.

== Conservation status ==
Though its total population size is unknown, and it is nowhere common, the population of Emei leaf warblers appears to be stable, so the International Union for Conservation of Nature rates it as a species of least concern.
