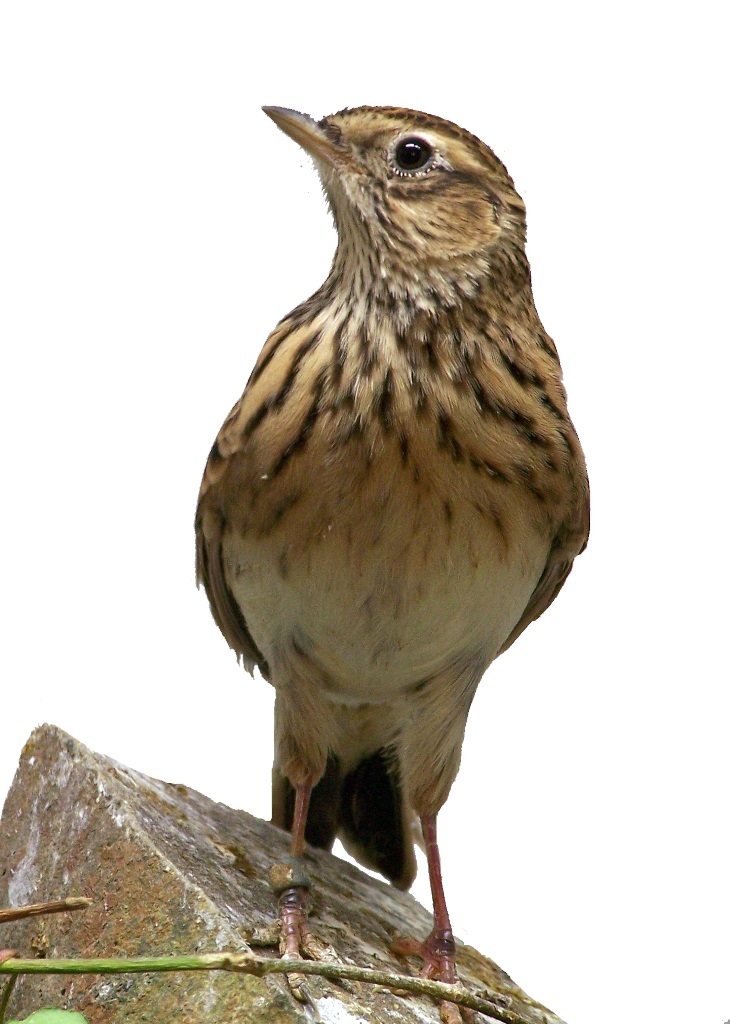
- Eurasian skylark (Alauda arvensis)

Scientific classification
- Kingdom: Animalia
- Phylum: Chordata
- Class: Aves
- Order: Passeriformes
- Parvorder: Sylviida
- Family: Alaudidae; Vigors, 1825

Genera
- see text

= Lark =

Family of birds

Larks are passerine birds of the family Alaudidae. Larks have a cosmopolitan distribution with the largest number of species occurring in Africa. Only a single species, the horned lark, occurs in North America, and only Horsfield's bush lark occurs in Australia. Habitats vary widely, but many species live in drier regions. When the word "lark" is used without specification, it often refers to the Eurasian skylark (Alauda arvensis).

== Taxonomy and systematics ==
The family Alaudidae was introduced in 1825 by the Irish zoologist Nicholas Aylward Vigors as a subfamily Alaudina of the finch family Fringillidae. Larks are a well-defined family, partly because of the shape of their tarsus. They have multiple scutes on the hind side of their tarsi, rather than the single plate found in most songbirds. They also lack a pessulus, the bony central structure in the syrinx of songbirds. They were long placed at or near the beginning of the songbirds or oscines (now often called Passeri), just after the suboscines and before the swallows, for example in the American Ornithologists' Union's first check-list. Some authorities, such as the British Ornithologists' Union and the Handbook of the Birds of the World, adhere to that placement. However, many other classifications follow the Sibley-Ahlquist taxonomy in placing the larks in a large oscine subgroup Passerida (which excludes crows, shrikes and their allies, vireos, and many groups characteristic of Australia and southeastern Asia). For instance, the American Ornithologists' Union places larks just after the crows, shrikes, and vireos. At a finer level of detail, some now place the larks at the beginning of a superfamily Sylvioidea with the swallows, various "Old World warbler" and "babbler" groups, and others. Molecular phylogenetic studies have shown that within the Sylvioidea the larks form a sister clade to the family Panuridae which contains a single species, the bearded reedling (Panurus biarmicus). The phylogeny of larks (Alaudidae) was reviewed in 2013, leading to the recognition of the arrangement below.

The genus level cladogram shown below is based on a molecular phylogenetic study of the larks by Per Alström and collaborators published in 2023. The subfamilies are those proposed by the authors. For two species the results conflict with the taxonomy published online in July 2023 by Frank Gill, Pamela Rasmussen and David Donsker on behalf of the International Ornithological Committee (IOC): the rusty bush lark (Mirafra rufa) and Gillett's lark (Mirafra gilletti) were found to be embedded in the genus Calendulauda. Alström and collaborators proposed that the genus Mirafra should be split into four genera: Mirafra, Plocealauda, Amirafra and Corypha.

- Alaudidae
  - Certhilaudinae
    - - Alaemon – hoopoe-larks (2 species)
      - - - Ammomanopsis – Gray's lark
          - Chersomanes – larks (2 species)
        - Certhilauda – long-billed larks (4 species)
    - - Eremopterix – sparrow-larks (8 species)
      - - Pinarocorys – larks (2 species)
        - - Ramphocoris – thick-billed lark
          - Ammomanes – larks (3 species)
  - - Mirafrinae
      - Calendulauda – larks (8 species)
      - - Heteromirafra – larks (2 species)
        - - - Mirafra – larks (7 species)
            - Plocealauda – bush larks (5 species)
          - - Amirafra – larks (3 species)
            - Corypha – larks (11 species)
    - Alaudinae
      - - - Lullula – woodlark
          - Spizocorys – larks (7 species)
        - - Alauda – skylarks (4 species)
          - Galerida – larks (6 species)
      - - - Eremophila – horned larks (2 species)
          - Calandrella – short-toed larks (6 species)
        - - Melanocorypha – larks (5 species)
          - - - Chersophilus – Dupont's lark
              - Eremalauda – larks (2 species)
            - Alaudala – short-toed larks (5 species)

=== Extant genera ===
The family Alaudidae contains 98 extant species which are divided into 24 genera: For more detail, see list of lark species.

Image	Genus	Living species
	Alaemon Keyserling & Blasius, 1840	Greater hoopoe-lark (Alaemon alaudipes); Lesser hoopoe-lark (Alaemon hamertoni)
	Ammomanopsis Bianchi, 1905	Gray's lark (Ammomanopsis grayi)
	Chersomanes Cabanis, 1851	Beesley's lark (Chersomanes beesleyi); Spike-heeled lark (Chersomanes albofasciata)
	Certhilauda Swainson, 1827	Short-clawed lark (Certhilauda chuana); Karoo long-billed lark (Certhilauda subcoronata); Eastern long-billed lark (Certhilauda semitorquata); Cape long-billed lark (Certhilauda curvirostris)
	Pinarocorys Shelley, 1902	Dusky lark (Pinarocorys nigricans); Rufous-rumped lark (Pinarocorys erythropygia)
	Ramphocoris Bonaparte, 1850	Thick-billed lark (Ramphocoris clotbey)
	Ammomanes Cabanis, 1851	Desert lark (Ammomanes deserti); Bar-tailed lark (Ammomanes cinctura); Rufous-tailed lark (Ammomanes phoenicura)
	Eremopterix Kaup, 1836	Black-eared sparrow-lark (Eremopterix australis); Madagascar lark (Eremopterix hova); Black-crowned sparrow-lark (Eremopterix nigriceps); Chestnut-backed sparrow-lark (Eremopterix leucotis); Ashy-crowned sparrow-lark (Eremopterix griseus); Chestnut-headed sparrow-lark (Eremopterix signatus); Grey-backed sparrow-lark (Eremopterix verticalis); Fischer's sparrow-lark (Eremopterix leucopareia)
	Calendulauda Blyth, 1855	Sabota lark (Calendulauda sabota); Pink-breasted lark (Calendulauda poecilosterna); Foxy lark (Calendulauda alopex); Fawn-coloured lark (Calendulauda africanoides); Karoo lark (Calendulauda albescens); Red lark (Calendulauda burra); Dune lark (Calendulauda erythrochlamys); Barlow's lark (Calendulauda barlowi)
	Heteromirafra Grant, 1913	Rudd's lark (Heteromirafra ruddi) (Grant, 1908); Archer's lark (Heteromirafra archeri) Clarke, 1920
	Plocealauda Alström et al., 2023	Burmese bush lark, Plocealauda microptera; Indochinese bush lark, Plocealauda erythrocephala; Jerdon's bush lark, Plocealauda affinis; Indian bush lark, Plocealauda erythroptera; Bengal bush lark, Plocealauda assamica
	Mirafra Horsfield, 1821	Monotonous lark, Mirafra passerina; Kordofan lark, Mirafra cordofanica; Williams's lark, Mirafra williamsi; Friedmann's lark, Mirafra pulpa; White-tailed lark, Mirafra albicauda; Melodious lark, Mirafra cheniana; Singing bush lark, Mirafra javanica
	Amirafra Bianchi, 1906	Collared lark, Amirafra collaris; Flappet lark, Amirafra rufocinnamomea; Angola lark, Amirafra angolensis
	Corypha Gray, GR, 1840	Highland lark, Corypha kurrae; Cape clapper lark, Corypha apiata; Eastern clapper lark, Corypha fasciolata; Plains lark, Corypha kabalii; Plateau lark, Corypha nigrescens; Rufous-naped lark, Corypha africana; Sentinel lark, Corypha athi; Somali lark, Corypha somalica; Red-winged lark, Corypha hypermetra; Russet lark, Corypha sharpii; Kidepo lark, Corypha kidepoensis
	Lullula Kaup, 1829	Woodlark (Lullula arborea)
	Spizocorys Sundevall, 1872	Obbia lark (Spizocorys obbiensis); Sclater's lark (Spizocorys sclateri); Stark's lark (Spizocorys starki); Short-tailed lark (Spizocorys fremantlii); Masked lark (Spizocorys personata); Botha's lark (Spizocorys fringillaris); Pink-billed lark (Spizocorys conirostris)
	Alauda Linnaeus, 1758	White-winged lark (Alauda leucoptera); Raso lark (Alauda razae); Oriental skylark (Alauda gulgula); Eurasian skylark (Alauda arvensis)
	Galerida Boie, F, 1828	Sykes's lark (Galerida deva); Sun lark (Galerida modesta); Large-billed lark (Galerida magnirostris); Thekla lark (Galerida theklae); Crested lark (Galerida cristata); Malabar lark (Galerida malabarica)
	Eremophila F. Boie, 1828	Horned lark (Eremophila alpestris); Temminck's lark (Eremophila bilopha)
	Calandrella Kaup, 1829	Hume's short-toed lark (Calandrella acutirostris); Mongolian short-toed lark (Calandrella dukhunensis); Blanford's lark (Calandrella blanfordi); Rufous-capped lark (Calandrella eremica); Red-capped lark (Calandrella cinerea); Greater short-toed lark (Calandrella brachydactyla)
	Melanocorypha F. Boie, 1828	Bimaculated lark (Melanocorypha bimaculata); Calandra lark (Melanocorypha calandra); Black lark (Melanocorypha yeltoniensis); Mongolian lark (Melanocorypha mongolica); Tibetan lark (Melanocorypha maxima)
	Chersophilus Sharpe, 1890	Dupont's lark (Chersophilus duponti)
	Eremalauda WL Sclater, 1926	Dunn's lark (Eremalauda dunni); Arabian lark (Eremalauda eremodites)
	Alaudala Horsfield & Moore, 1858	Somali short-toed lark, Alaudala somalica; Asian short-toed lark, Alaudala cheleensis; Mediterranean short-toed lark, Alaudala rufescens; Sand lark, Alaudala raytal; Turkestan short-toed lark, Alaudala heinei

=== Extinct genera ===
- † Genus Eremarida – (Eremarida xerophila)

== Description ==
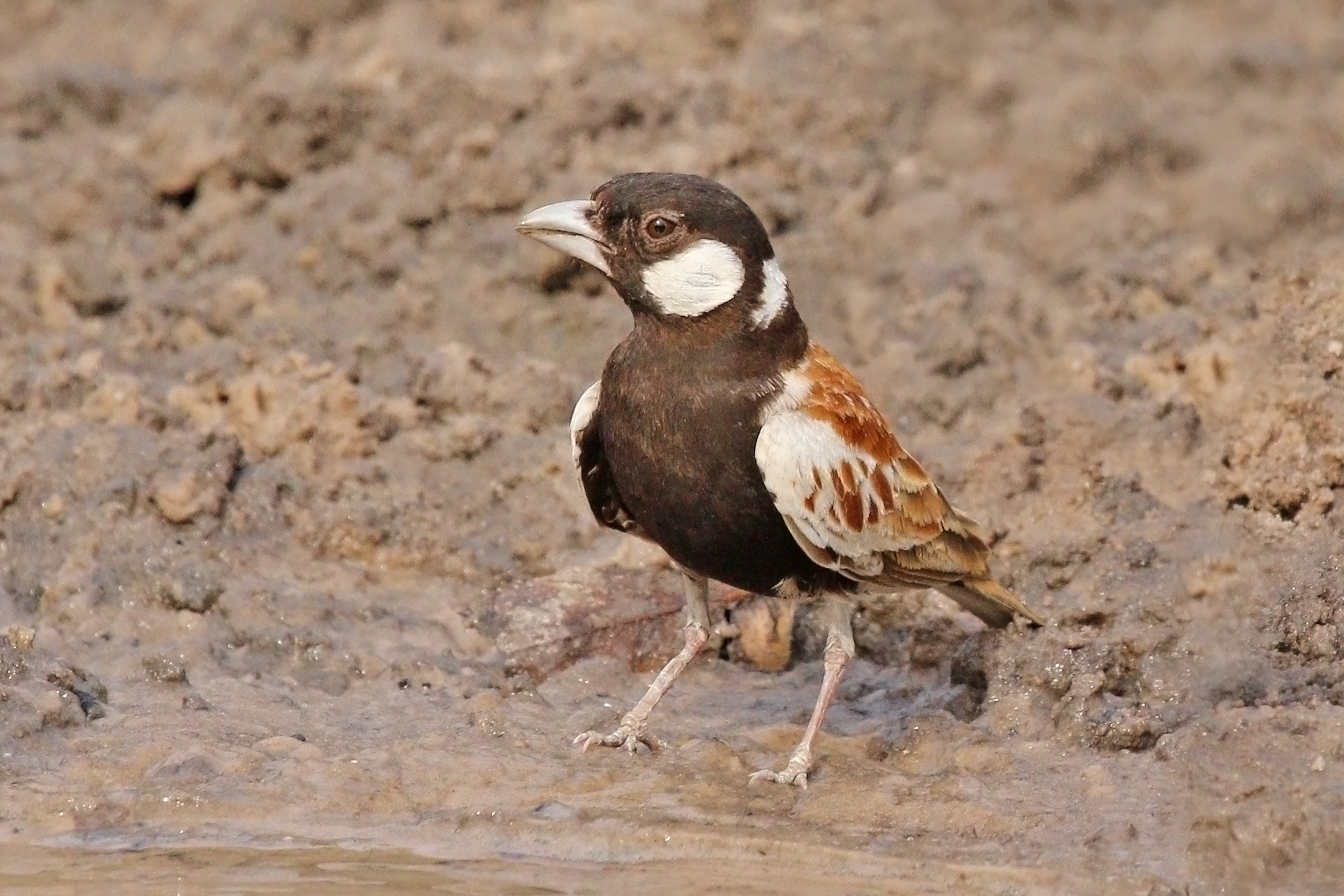
A chestnut-backed sparrow-lark

Larks, or the family Alaudidae, are small- to medium-sized birds, 12 to 24 cm (4.7 to 9.4 in) in length and 15 to 75 g (0.5 to 2.6 oz) in mass. The smallest larks are likely the Spizocorys species, which can weigh only around 14 g (0.49 oz) in species like the pink-billed lark and the Obbia lark, while the largest lark is the Tibetan lark.

Like many ground birds, most lark species have long hind claws, which are thought to provide stability while standing. Most have streaked brown plumage, some boldly marked with black or white. Their dull appearance camouflages them on the ground, especially when on the nest. They feed on insects and seeds; though adults of most species eat seeds primarily, all species feed their young insects for at least the first week after hatching. Many species dig with their bills to uncover food. Some larks have heavy bills (reaching an extreme in the thick-billed lark) for cracking seeds open, while others have long, down-curved bills, which are especially suitable for digging.

Larks are the only passerines that lose all their feathers in their first moult (in all species whose first moult is known). This may result from the poor quality of the chicks' feathers, which in turn may result from the benefits to the parents of switching the young to a lower-quality diet (seeds), which requires less work from the parents.

In many respects, including long tertial feathers, larks resemble other ground birds such as pipits. However, in larks the tarsus (the lowest leg bone, connected to the toes) has only one set of scales on the rear surface, which is rounded. Pipits and all other songbirds have two plates of scales on the rear surface, which meet at a protruding rear edge.

=== Calls and song ===
Larks have more elaborate calls than most birds, and often extravagant songs given in display flight. These melodious sounds, combined with a willingness to expand into anthropogenic habitats—as long as these are not too intensively managed—have ensured larks a prominent place in literature and music, especially the Eurasian skylark in northern Europe and the crested lark and calandra lark in southern Europe.

== Behaviour ==
=== Breeding ===
Male larks use song flights to defend their breeding territory and attract a mate. Most species build nests on the ground, usually cups of dead grass, but in some species the nests are more complicated and partly domed. A few desert species nest very low in bushes, perhaps so circulating air can cool the nest. Larks' eggs are usually speckled. The size of the clutch is very variable and ranges from the single egg laid by Sclater's lark up to 6–8 eggs laid by the calandra lark and the black lark. Larks incubate for 11 to 16 days.

== In culture ==
=== Larks as food ===
Larks, commonly consumed with bones intact, have historically been considered wholesome, delicate, and light game. They can be used in a number of dishes; for example, they can be stewed, broiled, or used as filling in a meat pie. Lark's tongues are reputed to have been particularly highly valued as a delicacy. In modern times, shrinking habitats made lark meat rare and hard to come by, though it can still be found in restaurants in Italy and elsewhere in southern Europe.

=== Symbolism ===
The lark in mythology and literature stands for daybreak, as in Chaucer's "The Knight's Tale", "the bisy larke, messager of day", and Shakespeare's Sonnet 29, "the lark at break of day arising / From sullen earth, sings hymns at heaven's gate" (11–12). The lark is also (often simultaneously) associated with "lovers and lovers' observance" (as in Bernart de Ventadorn's Can vei la lauzeta mover) and with "church services". These meanings of daybreak and religious reference can be combined, as in Blake's Visions of the Daughters of Albion, into a "spiritual daybreak" to signify "passage from Earth to Heaven and from Heaven to Earth". With Renaissance painters such as Domenico Ghirlandaio, the lark symbolizes Christ, with reference to John 16:16.

=== Literature ===
Percy Bysshe Shelley's famed 1820 poem "To a Skylark" was inspired by the melodious song of a skylark during an evening walk.

English poet George Meredith wrote a poem titled "The Lark Ascending" in 1881.

Gerard Manley Hopkins wrote a poem entitled “The Sea and the Skylark” in 1877.

In Mervyn Peake's Titus Groan, first book of the Gormenghast trilogy, "Swelter approache[s] [Lord Sepulchrave] with a salver of toasted larks" during the reception following newborn Titus's christening.

Canadian poet John McCrae mentions larks in his poem "In Flanders Fields".

=== Music ===
English composer Ralph Vaughan Williams wrote a musical setting of George Meredith's poem, completed in 1914. It was composed for violin and piano, and entitled The Lark Ascending - A Romance. The work received its first performance in December 1920. Soon afterwards the composer arranged it for violin and orchestra, in which version it was first performed in June 1921, and this is how the work remains best-known today.

The old Welsh folk song Marwnad yr Ehedydd (The Lark's Elegy) refers to the death of "the Lark", possibly as a coded reference to the Welsh leader Owain Glyndŵr.

The French-Canadian folk song Alouette refers to plucking feathers from a lark.

=== Pet ===
Traditionally, larks are kept as pets in China. In Beijing, larks are taught to mimic the voice of other songbirds and animals. A traditional habit of the Beijingers to teach their larks 13 kinds of sounds in a strict order (called "the 13 songs of a lark"; Chinese: 百灵十三套, bǎilíng shísān tào). The larks that can sing the full 13 sounds in the correct order are highly valued, while any disruption in the songs will decrease their value significantly.

=== Early awakening ===
Larks sing early in the day, often before dawn, leading to the expression "up with the lark" for a person who is awake early in the day, and the term lark being applied to someone who habitually rises early in the morning.

== See also ==
- Lark bunting
- Lark sparrow
- Magpie-lark—Neither a lark nor a magpie, but a giant monarch flycatcher)
- Meadowlark
- Songlark
- Titlark, a synonym for meadow pipit
