= Eremarida =

Scientific classification
- Kingdom: Animalia
- Phylum: Chordata
- Class: Aves
- Order: Passeriformes
- Family: Alaudidae
- Genus: †Eremarida; Boev, 2012

Species
- see text

Extinct genus of birds

Eremarida is a recently discovered extinct genus of lark in the family Alaudidae. The genus is known from a single fossil specimen found in eastern Europe, which serves as both the genus and specimen type.

== Species ==
The following species is classified within the genus:

- †Eremarida xerophila - Boev, 2012: Fossil record of late Miocene from Hrabarsko, Bulgaria.
