= Russet lark =

Conservation status
- Endangered (IUCN 3.1)

Scientific classification
- Kingdom: Animalia
- Phylum: Chordata
- Class: Aves
- Order: Passeriformes
- Family: Alaudidae
- Genus: Corypha
- Species: C. sharpii

Binomial name
- Corypha sharpii (Elliot, DG, 1897)

Species of bird

The russet lark (Corypha sharpii), also known as Sharpe's lark, is a species of lark in the family Alaudidae found in Somalia.

== Taxonomy ==
The russet lark was formerly placed in the genus Mirafra. It is one of several species that were moved to the resurrected genus Corypha based on the results of a large molecular genetic study by the Swedish ornithologist Per Alström and collaborators that was published in 2023. The species is monotypic: no subspecies are recognised.
