= Peter Colston (ornithologist) =

English ornithologist

Peter R. Colston (born 1935) is an English ornithologist.

Colston was Senior Curator at the Natural History Museum until his retirement in 1995. He joined the staff of the museum in 1961, and made collecting trips to Andalucia, Australia and Africa. He became an expert on African birds, publishing description of four new species, including Appert's greenbul. Between 1989 and 1995 he made private trips to China, with Per Alström and Urban Olsson, where they discovered three previously undescribed Phylloscopus warblers.

== Works ==
- A Field Guide to the Rare Birds of Britain & Europe (with Ian Lewington and Per Alström)
- The Waders of Britain and Europe (with Philip Burton)
- BIRDS of MOUNT NIMBA West Africa LIBERIA (1986) (with Kai Curry-Lindahl)
