= Per Alström =

Swedish Professor of ornithology (born 1961)

Per Johan Alström (born 9 April 1961) is a Swedish Professor of ornithology. He does research in taxonomy, systematics, and evolution, with birds in Asia as a specialty. Alström works at the Department of Ecology and Genetics (Animal Ecology) at Uppsala University and at the Swedish Species Information Centre at the Swedish University of Agricultural Sciences, Uppsala. He has previously worked as e.g. Curator of Ornithology at the Swedish Museum of Natural History, and been a guest researcher at the Percy Fitzpatrick Institute of African Ornithology, University of Cape Town and a visiting professor at the Chinese Academy of Sciences, Beijing. He is chairman of the Scientific Committee of the Swedish Taxonomy Initiative and the Committee for Swedish Animal Names and Swedish focal point for the Global Taxonomy Initiative under the Convention on Biological Diversity (CBD). Deputy Editor-in-Chief of the international ornithological journal Avian Research.

The author name Alström is used for species scientifically described by Per Alström: Phylloscopus hainanus, Phylloscopus emeiensis, Phylloscopus calciatilis, Seicercus soror, Locustella chengi, Motacilla samveasnae, Zoothera salimalii.
