= List of lark species =

Larks form the family Alaudidae. The International Ornithological Committee (IOC) recognizes these 100 species of larks distributed among 34 genera.

This list is presented according to the IOC taxonomic sequence and can also be sorted alphabetically by common name and binomial.

Common name	Binomial name	IOC sequence
Greater hoopoe-lark	Alaemon alaudipes (Desfontaines, 1789)	1
Lesser hoopoe-lark	Alaemon hamertoni Witherby, 1905	2
Beesley's lark	Chersomanes beesleyi Benson, 1966	3
Spike-heeled lark	Chersomanes albofasciata (Lafresnaye, 1836)	4
Gray's lark	Ammomanopsis grayi (Wahlberg, 1855)	5
Short-clawed lark	Certhilauda chuana (Smith, A, 1836)	6
Benguela long-billed lark	Certhilauda benguelensis (Sharpe, 1904)	7
Karoo long-billed lark	Certhilauda subcoronata Smith, A, 1843	8
Eastern long-billed lark	Certhilauda semitorquata Smith, A, 1836	9
Cape long-billed lark	Certhilauda curvirostris (Hermann, 1783)	10
Dusky lark	Pinarocorys nigricans (Sundevall, 1850)	11
Rufous-rumped lark	Pinarocorys erythropygia (Strickland, 1852)	12
Thick-billed lark	Ramphocoris clotbey (Bonaparte, 1850)	13
Desert lark	Ammomanes deserti (Lichtenstein, MHC, 1823)	14
Bar-tailed lark	Ammomanes cinctura (Gould, 1839)	15
Rufous-tailed lark	Ammomanes phoenicura (Franklin, 1831)	16
Black-eared sparrow-lark	Eremopterix australis (Smith, A, 1836)	17
Madagascar lark	Eremopterix hova (Hartlaub, 1860)	18
Black-crowned sparrow-lark	Eremopterix nigriceps (Gould, 1839)	19
Chestnut-backed sparrow-lark	Eremopterix leucotis (Stanley, 1814)	20
Ashy-crowned sparrow-lark	Eremopterix griseus (Scopoli, 1786)	21
Chestnut-headed sparrow-lark	Eremopterix signatus (Oustalet, 1886)	22
Grey-backed sparrow-lark	Eremopterix verticalis (Smith, A, 1836)	23
Fischer's sparrow-lark	Eremopterix leucopareia (Fischer, GA & Reichenow, 1884)	24
Rusty bush lark	Calendulauda rufa Lynes, 1920	25
Sabota lark	Calendulauda sabota (Smith, A, 1836)	26
Pink-breasted lark	Calendulauda poecilosterna (Reichenow, 1879)	27
Gillett's lark	Calendulauda gilletti Sharpe, 1895	28
Fawn-colored lark	Calendulauda africanoides (Smith, A, 1836)	29
Karoo lark	Calendulauda albescens (Lafresnaye, 1839)	30
Red lark	Calendulauda burra (Bangs, 1930)	31
Dune lark	Calendulauda erythrochlamys (Strickland, 1853)	32
Archer's lark	Heteromirafra archeri Clarke, S, 1920	33
Rudd's lark	Heteromirafra ruddi (Grant, CHB, 1908)	34
Monotonous lark	Mirafra passerina Gyldenstolpe, 1926	35
Friedmann's lark	Mirafra pulpa Friedmann, 1930	36
Kordofan lark	Mirafra cordofanica Strickland, 1852	37
Williams's lark	Mirafra williamsi Macdonald, 1956	38
Singing bush lark	Mirafra javanica Horsfield, 1821	39
Melodious lark	Mirafra cheniana Smith, A, 1843	40
White-tailed lark	Mirafra albicauda Reichenow, 1891	41
Burmese bush lark	Plocealauda microptera Hume, 1873	42
Indochinese bush lark	Plocealauda erythrocephala Salvadori & Giglioli, 1885	43
Jerdon's bush lark	Plocealauda affinis Blyth, 1845	44
Indian bush lark	Plocealauda erythroptera Blyth, 1845	45
Bengal bush lark	Plocealauda assamica Horsfield, 1840	46
Collared lark	Amirafra collaris Sharpe, 1896	47
Angola lark	Amirafra angolensis Barboza du Bocage, 1880	48
Flappet lark	Amirafra rufocinnamomea (Salvadori, 1866)	49
Cape clapper lark	Corypha apiata (Vieillot, 1816)	50
Eastern clapper lark	Corypha fasciolata (Sundevall, 1850)	51
Kidepo lark	Corypha kidepoensis (Macdonald, 1940)	52
Red-winged lark	Corypha hypermetra (Reichenow, 1879)	53
Highland lark	Corypha kurrae Lynes, 1923	54
Rufous-naped lark	Corypha africana Smith, A, 1836	55
Sentinel lark	Corypha athi Hartert, EJO, 1900	56
Plains lark	Corypha kabali White, CMN, 1943	57
Plateau lark	Corypha nigrescens Reichenow, 1900	58
Russet lark	Corypha sharpii Elliot, DG, 1897	59
Somali lark	Corypha somalica (Witherby, 1903)	60
Woodlark	Lullula arborea (Linnaeus, 1758)	61
Obbia lark	Spizocorys obbiensis Witherby, 1905	62
Sclater's lark	Spizocorys sclateri (Shelley, 1902)	63
Stark's lark	Spizocorys starki (Shelley, 1902)	64
Short-tailed lark	Spizocorys fremantlii (Lort Phillips, 1897)	65
Masked lark	Spizocorys personata Sharpe, 1895	66
Botha's lark	Spizocorys fringillaris (Sundevall, 1850)	67
Pink-billed lark	Spizocorys conirostris (Sundevall, 1850)	68
White-winged lark	Alauda leucoptera Pallas, 1811	69
Raso lark	Alauda razae (Alexander, 1898)	70
Oriental skylark	Alauda gulgula Franklin, 1831	71
Eurasian skylark	Alauda arvensis Linnaeus, 1758	72
Sykes's lark	Galerida deva (Sykes, 1832)	73
Sun lark	Galerida modesta Heuglin, 1864	74
Large-billed lark	Galerida magnirostris (Stephens, 1826)	75
Thekla's lark	Galerida theklae Brehm, AE, 1857	76
Crested lark	Galerida cristata (Linnaeus, 1758)	77
Malabar lark	Galerida malabarica (Scopoli, 1786)	78
Maghreb lark	Galerida macrorhyncha Tristram, 1859	79
Horned lark	Eremophila alpestris (Linnaeus, 1758)	80
Temminck's lark	Eremophila bilopha (Temminck, 1823)	81
Hume's short-toed lark	Calandrella acutirostris Hume, 1873	82
Mongolian short-toed lark	Calandrella dukhunensis (Sykes, 1832)	83
Blanford's lark	Calandrella blanfordi (Shelley, 1902)	84
Rufous-capped lark	Calandrella eremica (Reichenow & Peters, N, 1932)	85
Red-capped lark	Calandrella cinerea (Gmelin, JF, 1789)	86
Greater short-toed lark	Calandrella brachydactyla (Leisler, 1814)	87
Bimaculated lark	Melanocorypha bimaculata (Ménétriés, 1832)	88
Calandra lark	Melanocorypha calandra (Linnaeus, 1766)	89
Black lark	Melanocorypha yeltoniensis (Forster, JR, 1768)	90
Mongolian lark	Melanocorypha mongolica (Pallas, 1776)	91
Tibetan lark	Melanocorypha maxima Blyth, 1867	92
Dupont's lark	Chersophilus duponti (Vieillot, 1824)	93
Dunn's lark	Eremalauda dunni (Shelley, 1904)	94
Arabian lark	Eremalauda eremodites (Meinertzhagen, R, 1923)	95
Asian short-toed lark	Alaudala cheleensis Swinhoe, 1871	96
Somali short-toed lark	Alaudala somalica Sharpe, 1895	97
Mediterranean short-toed lark	Alaudala rufescens (Vieillot, 1819)	98
Turkestan short-toed lark	Alaudala heinei (Homeyer, 1873)	99
Sand lark	Alaudala raytal (Blyth, 1845)	100
