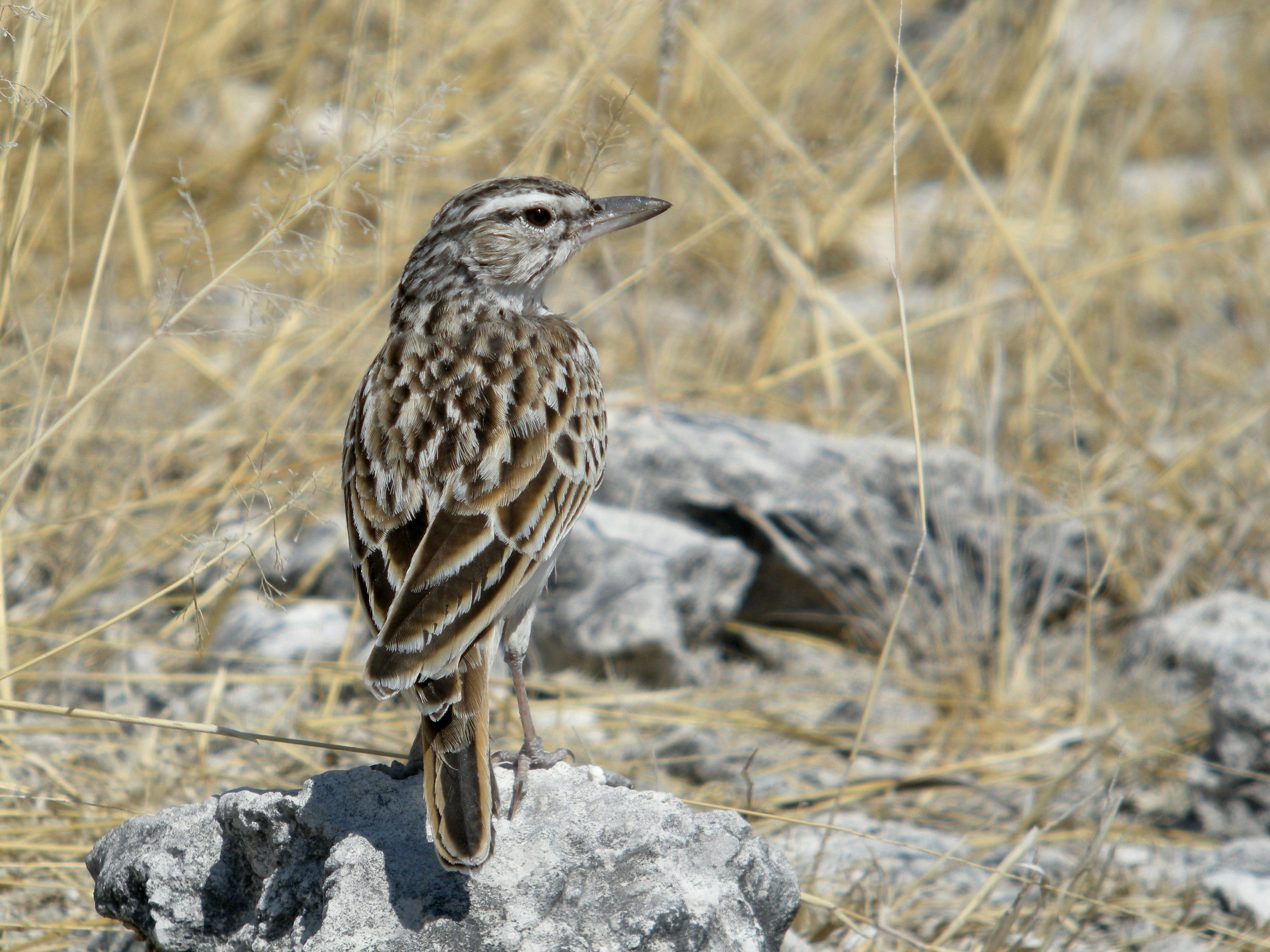
- Sabota lark (Calendulauda sabota)

Scientific classification
- Kingdom: Animalia
- Phylum: Chordata
- Class: Aves
- Order: Passeriformes
- Family: Alaudidae
- Genus: Calendulauda; Blyth, 1855

Type species
- Alauda albescens Lafresnaye, 1839
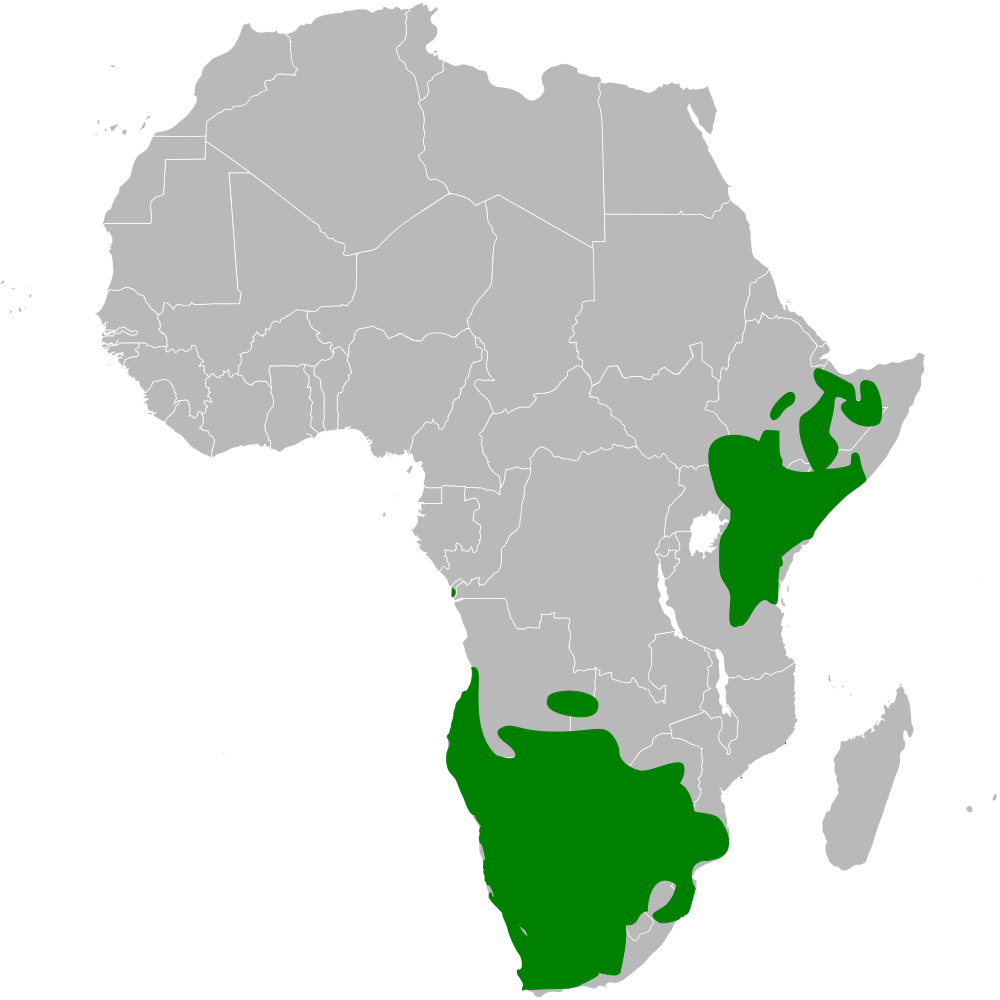
- range of the genus

= Calendulauda =

Genus of birds

Calendulauda is a genus of lark in the family Alaudidae. Established by Edward Blyth in 1855, it contains eight species.

== Taxonomy and systematics ==
The genus Calendulauda was introduced by the English zoologist Edward Blyth in 1855 with the Karoo lark as the type species. The name Calendulauda is a combination of the names of two other lark genera: Calendula and Alauda. All of the species in this genus were formerly assigned to the genus Mirafra and several were also formerly assigned to the genera Alauda and Certhilauda.

=== Species ===
The genus Calendulauda contains eight species:

Image	Scientific name	Common name	Distribution	
	Calendulauda rufa	Rusty bush lark	central and west Africa	
	Calendulauda sabota	Sabota lark	southern Africa	
	Calendulauda poecilosterna	Pink-breasted lark	southeastern South Sudan and southern Ethiopia through Kenya to southern Somalia, northeastern Tanzania and eastern Uganda	
	Calendulauda gilletti	Gillett's lark	east Africa	
	Calendulauda africanoides	Fawn-coloured lark (includes Foxy lark)	south-central and east-central Africa	
	Calendulauda albescens	Karoo lark	South Africa	
	Calendulauda burra	Red lark	western South Africa and possibly Namibia	
	Calendulauda erythrochlamys	Dune lark (includes Barlow's lark)	Namibia and northwest South Africa	-
