= Rusty bush lark =

Conservation status
- Least Concern (IUCN 3.1)

Scientific classification
- Kingdom: Animalia
- Phylum: Chordata
- Class: Aves
- Order: Passeriformes
- Family: Alaudidae
- Genus: Calendulauda
- Species: C. rufa

Binomial name
- Calendulauda rufa (Lynes, 1920)

Subspecies
- See text
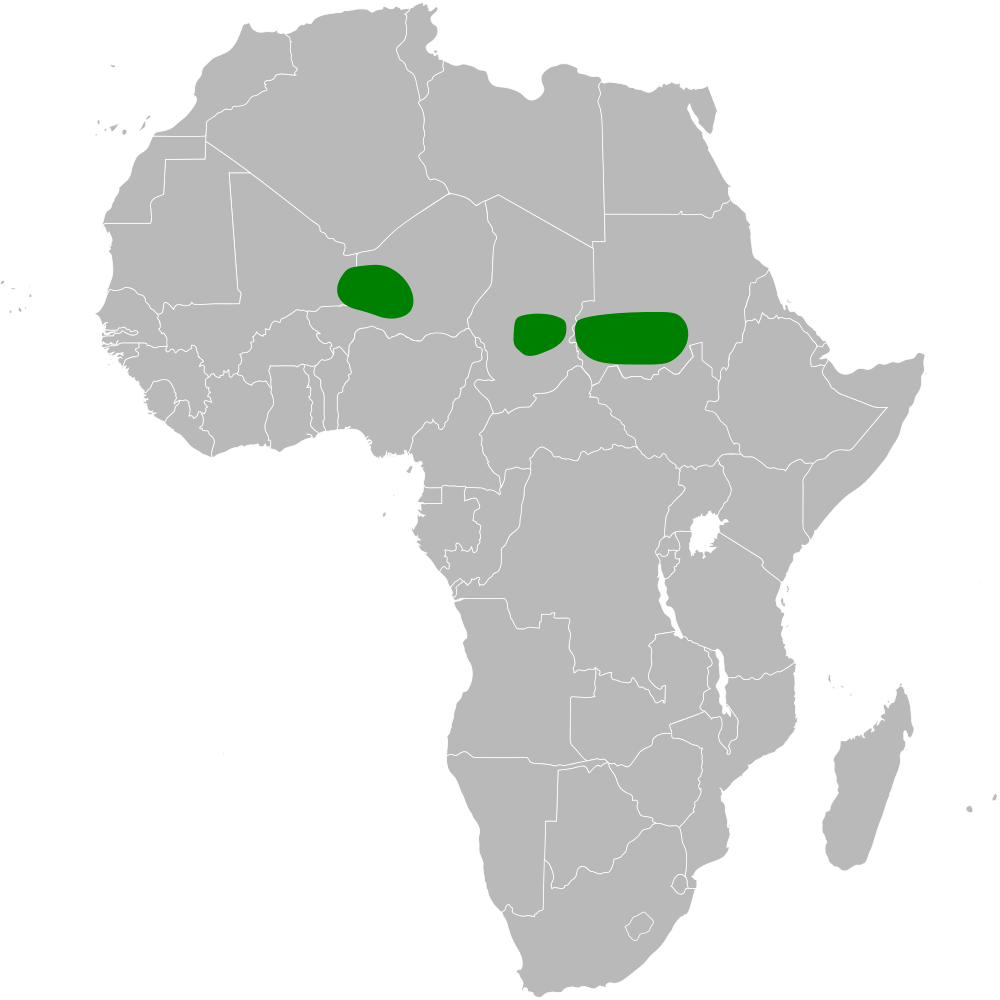

Species of bird

The rusty bush lark (Calendulauda rufa), also known as the rusty lark, is a species of lark in the family Alaudidae found in the Sahel region of north-central Africa.

== Description ==
It is a small lark, 13–15 centimetres (5–6 in) long, rusty-brown above, with a dark tail with (unlike many larks) no white on the sides. The head has a broad buff supercilium (eyebrow). The underparts are pale to buffy, unstreaked except for a few streaks on the side of the upper breast. The bill is dark brownish above, with a pale base on the underside. The song is given in flight, and is described as 'pleasing', without any further details described. Its nest, eggs, and breeding behaviour remain unknown.

== Taxonomy and systematics ==
The rusty bush lark was formerly placed in the genus Mirafra. It was moved to the genus Calendulauda, based on its plumage combined with the results of a large molecular genetic study of the Alaudidae by Per Alström and collaborators that was published in 2023.

=== Subspecies ===
Three subspecies are accepted; listed from west to east:

- C. r. nigriticola (Bates, GL, 1932) – Mali to Niger. Plumage dark, heavily streaked above; strongly buff-coloured below.
- C. r. rufa (Lynes, 1920) – Chad and west Sudan. Plumage intermediate, scaly-streaked above.
- C. r. lynesi (Grant, CHB & Mackworth-Praed, 1933) – central Sudan. Plumage plain, almost unstreaked above, pale buff below.

== Distribution and habitat ==
The range of the rusty bush lark is large, with an estimated global extent of occurrence of 470,000 km^{2} (180,000 sq mi). It is typically found inhabiting the dry savannah ecoregions of Chad, Mali, Niger, Sudan, and Togo. It occurs in dry savanna with scattered open Combretum woodland.

Despite being listed by IUCN as 'Least Concern', none were seen between May 1931 and 2 February 2026, when one was seen in south-central Chad; this sighting resulted in the first live photographs of the species ever taken.
