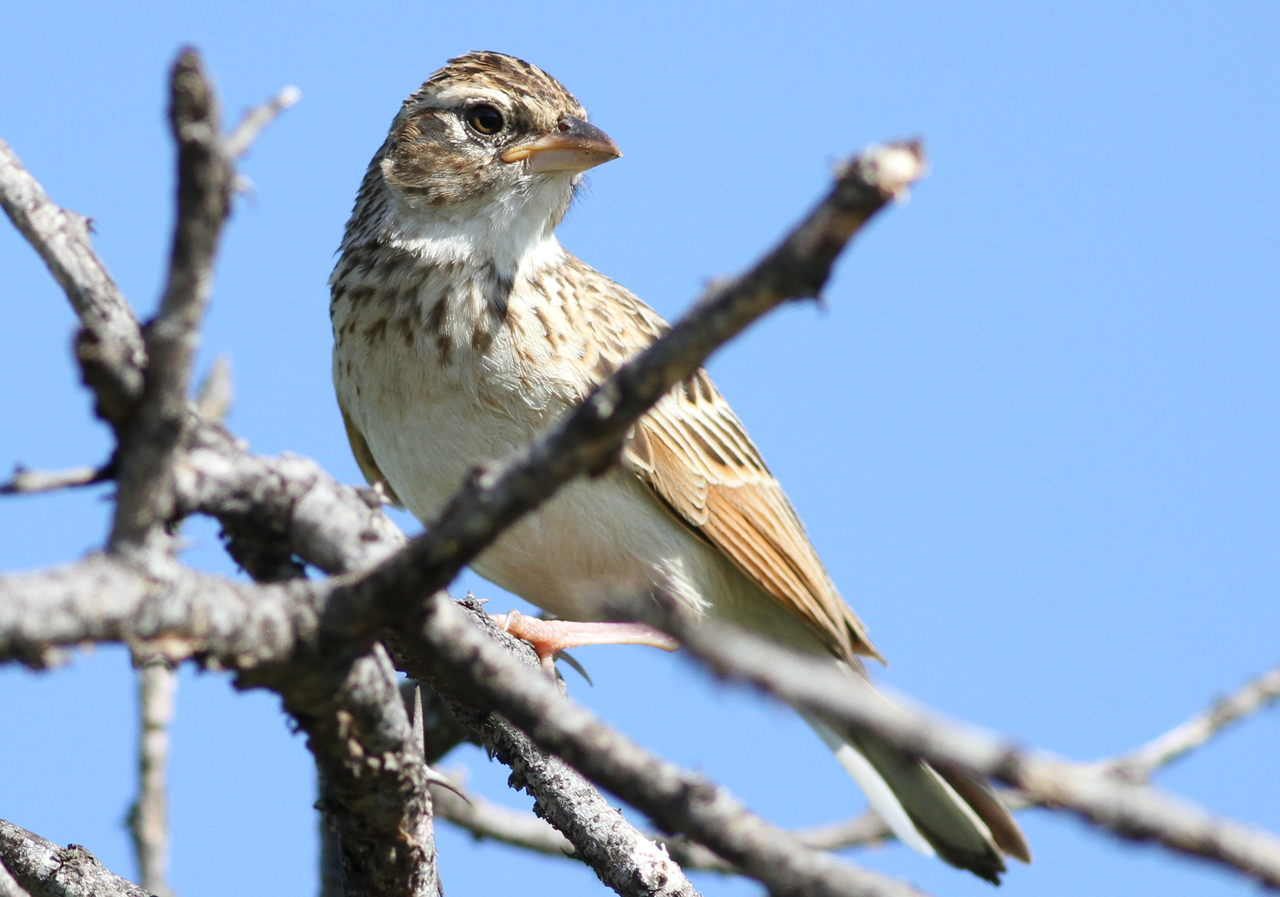
- Breeding adult

Conservation status
- Least Concern (IUCN 3.1)

Scientific classification
- Kingdom: Animalia
- Phylum: Chordata
- Class: Aves
- Order: Passeriformes
- Family: Alaudidae
- Genus: Mirafra
- Species: M. passerina

Binomial name
- Mirafra passerina Gyldenstolpe, 1926
- breeding and nomadic range

Synonyms
- Mirafra fringillaris

Audio
- Song

= Monotonous lark =

Species of bird

The monotonous lark (Mirafra passerina) is a species of lark in the family Alaudidae found in southern Africa.

== Taxonomy and systematics ==
The alternate names "white-tailed lark" and "white-tailed bush-lark" should not be confused with the species of the same name, Mirafra albicauda. Other alternate names include monotonous bush lark and Southern white-tailed bush-lark.

== Description ==
A medium-small, compact lark with a small bill, a plain face, and an indistinct eyebrow. It has streaky upperparts with a distinct rufous wing panel and a lightly-streaked buffy chest that separates the white throat from the pale belly.

== Range ==
The range of the monotonous lark is quite broad, extending over six countries: Angola, Botswana, Namibia, South Africa, Zambia, and Zimbabwe. Its global extent of occurrence is estimated at 1,400,000 km^{2}.

== Habitat ==
Its natural habitats are dry savanna and subtropical or tropical dry lowland grassland.
