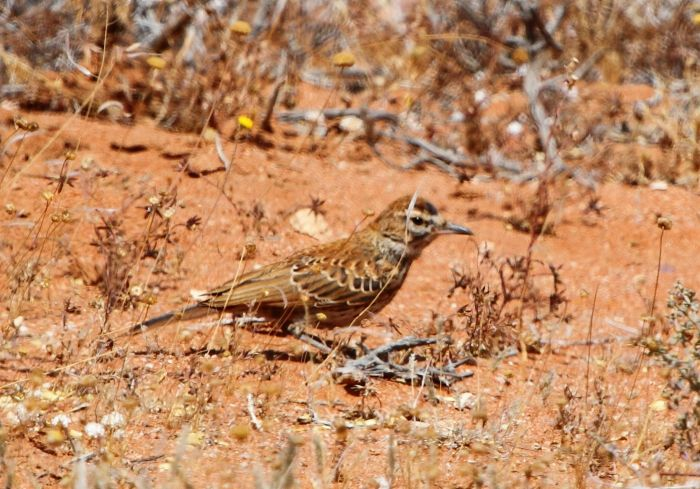
- C. a. subsp. guttata near Springbok

Conservation status
- Least Concern (IUCN 3.1)

Scientific classification
- Kingdom: Animalia
- Phylum: Chordata
- Class: Aves
- Order: Passeriformes
- Family: Alaudidae
- Genus: Calendulauda
- Species: C. albescens

Binomial name
- Calendulauda albescens (Lafresnaye, 1839)

Subspecies
- See text
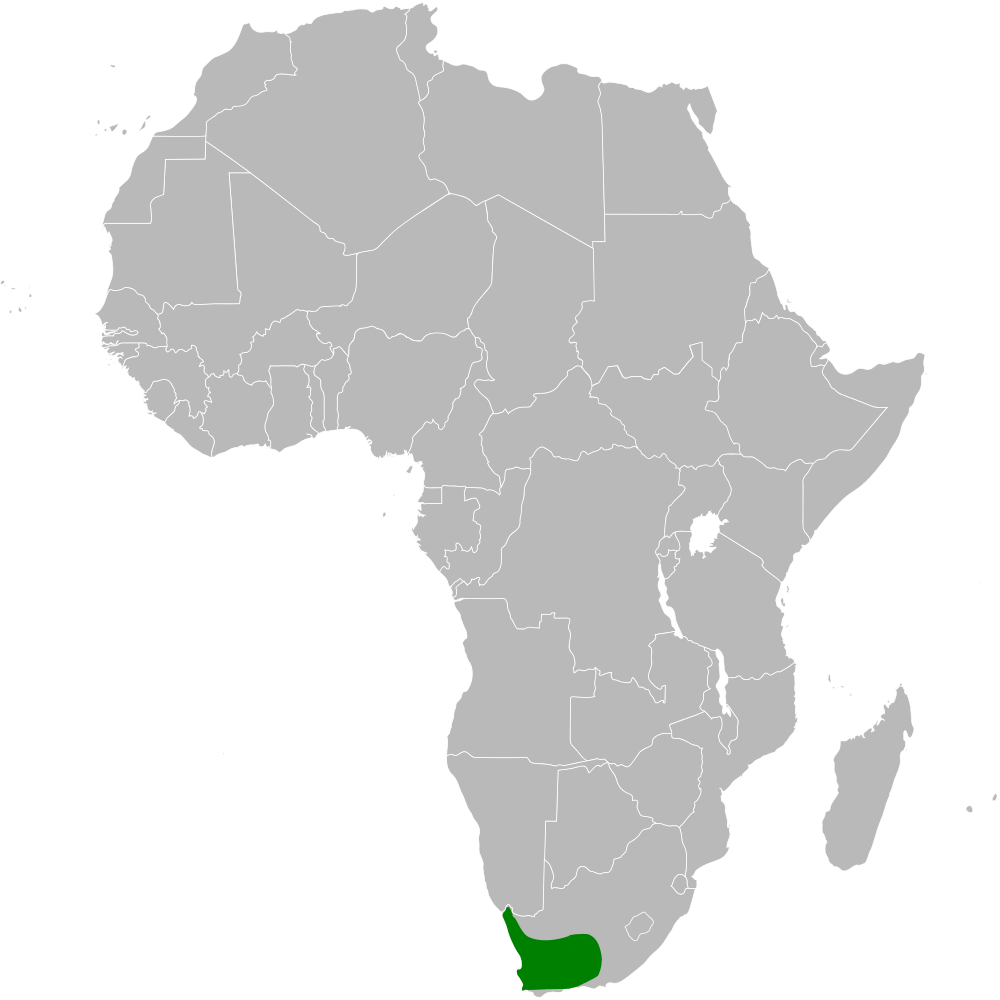

Synonyms
- Alauda albescens; Certhilauda albescens; Mirafra albescens; Mirafra nivosa

= Karoo lark =

Species of bird

The Karoo lark (Calendulauda albescens) or red-backed lark is a species of lark in the family Alaudidae. It is endemic to South Africa where its natural habitat is subtropical or tropical dry shrubland.

== Taxonomy and systematics ==
The Karoo lark was originally classified in the genus Alauda and subsequently Mirafra and Certhilauda, until moved to Calendulauda by the IOC in 2009. Not all authorities have followed this taxonomy change.

=== Subspecies ===
Four subspecies are recognized:

- C. a. codea - (Smith, A, 1843): Originally described as a separate species in the genus Alauda. Found on the western coast of South Africa
- C. a. albescens - (Lafresnaye, 1839): Found in south-western South Africa
- C. a. guttata - (Lafresnaye, 1839): Originally described as a separate species in the genus Alauda. Found in western South Africa
- C. a. karruensis - Roberts, 1936: Found in southern South Africa

Formerly, some authorities considered both the dune lark (as Certhilauda albescens erythrochlamys) and Barlow's lark (as Certhilauda albescens barlowi) to be subspecies of the Karoo lark.

== Gallery ==
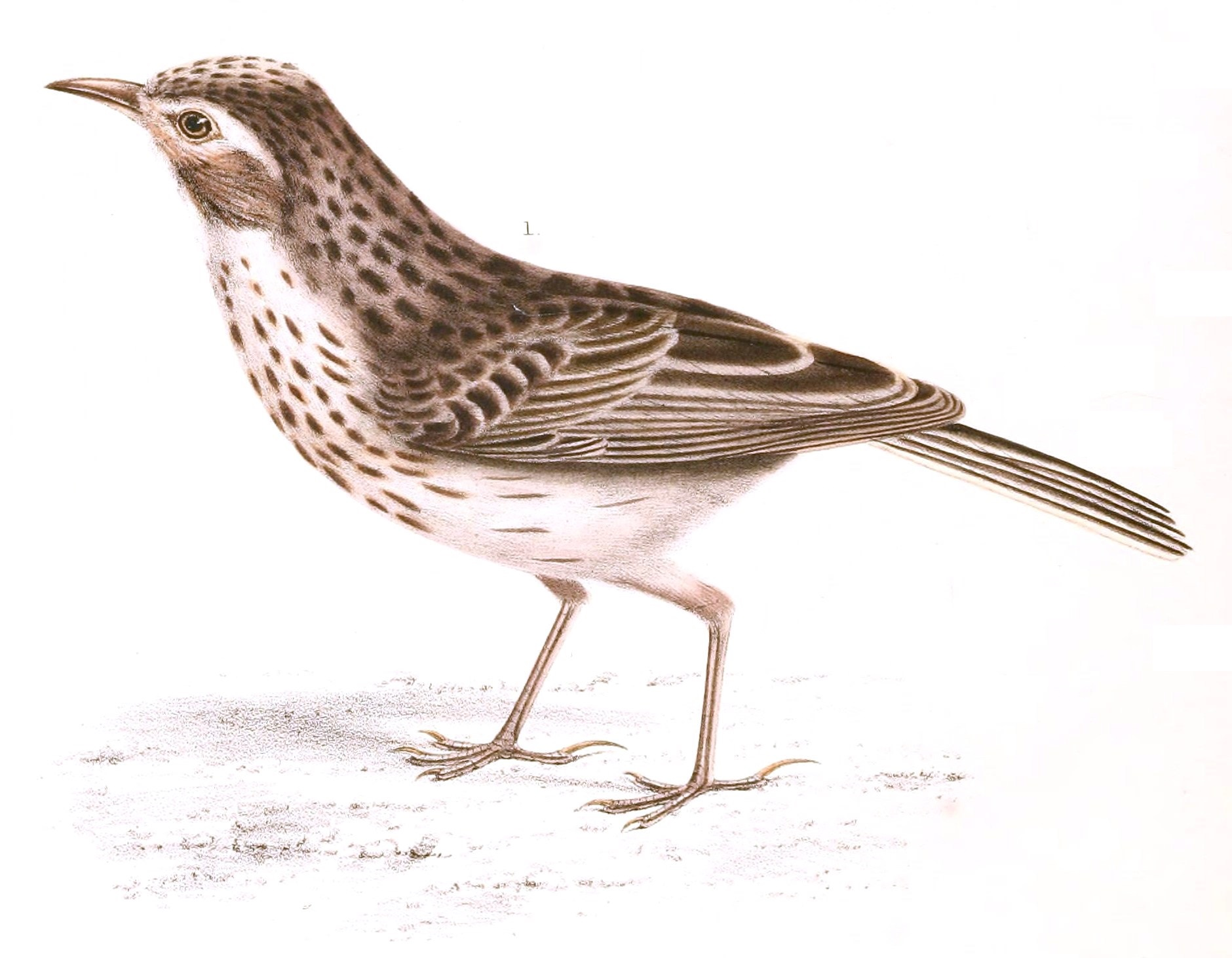
C. a. subsp. codea, illustrated by Andrew Smith, 1838

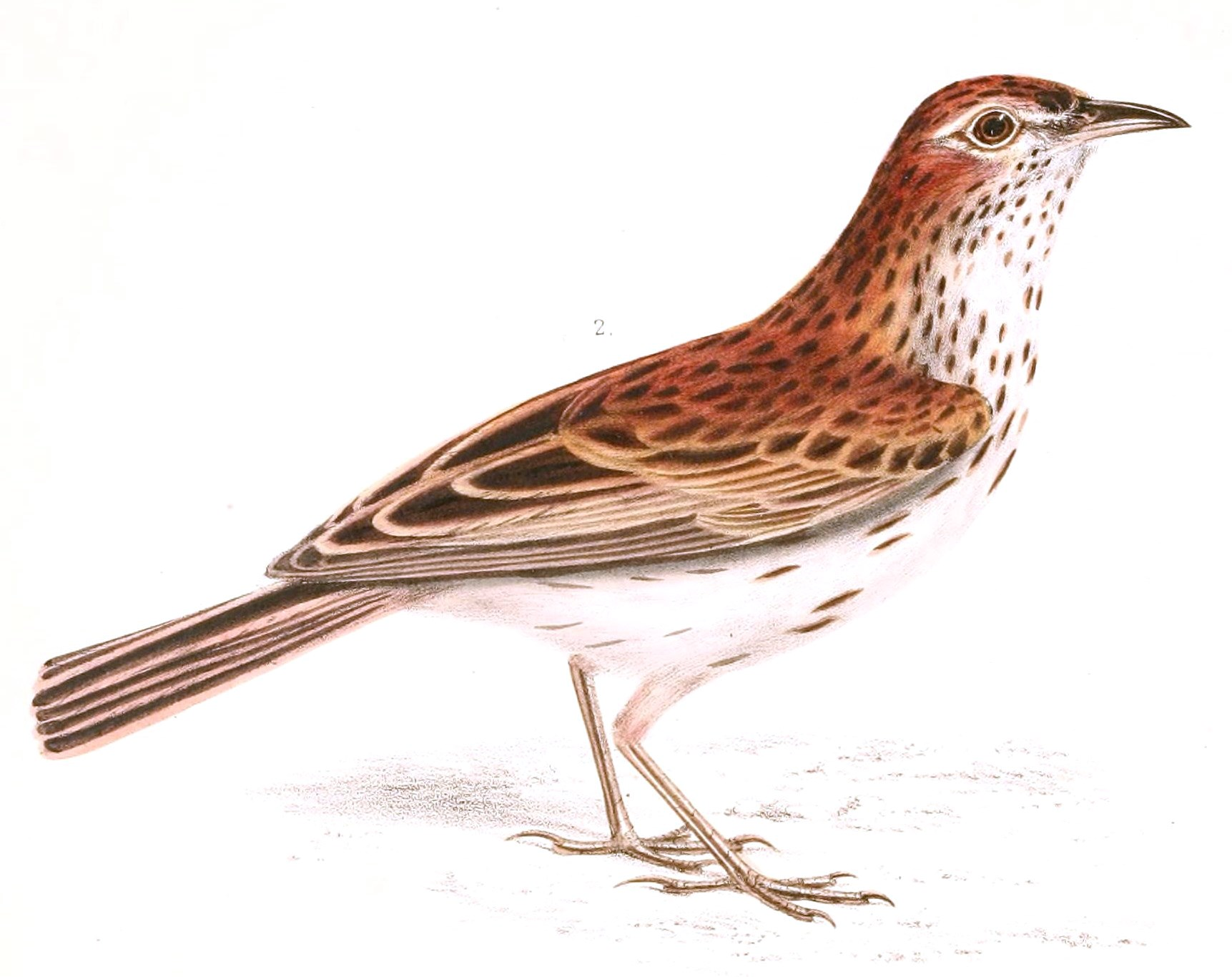
C. a. subsp. guttata, illustrated by Andrew Smith, 1838
