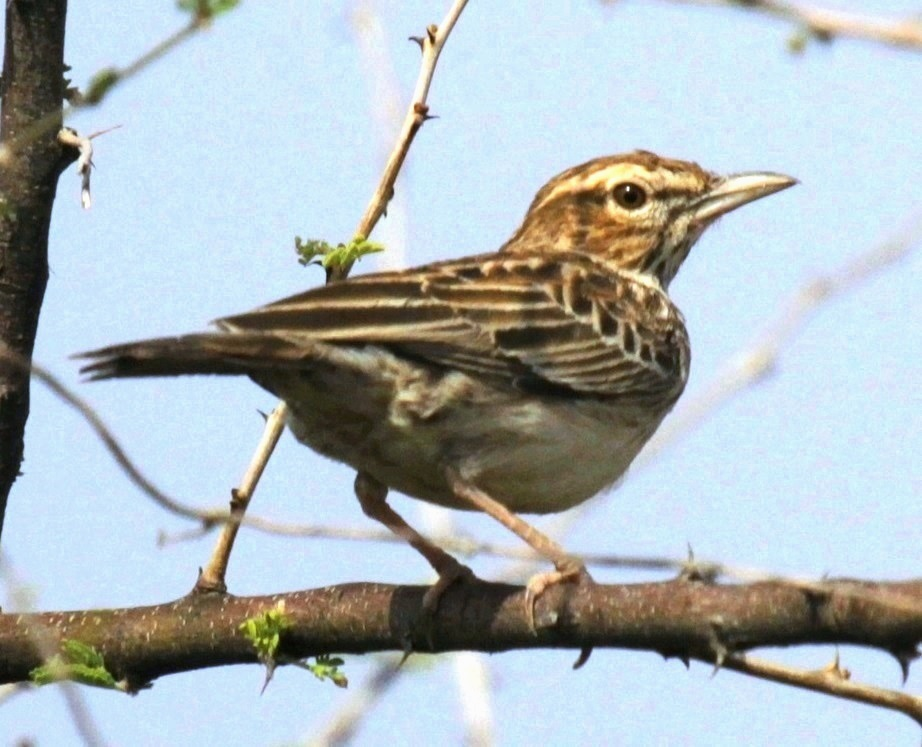
- In Ethiopia

Conservation status
- Least Concern (IUCN 3.1)

Scientific classification
- Kingdom: Animalia
- Phylum: Chordata
- Class: Aves
- Order: Passeriformes
- Family: Alaudidae
- Genus: Calendulauda
- Species: C. gilletti

Binomial name
- Calendulauda gilletti (Sharpe, 1895)

Subspecies
- See text
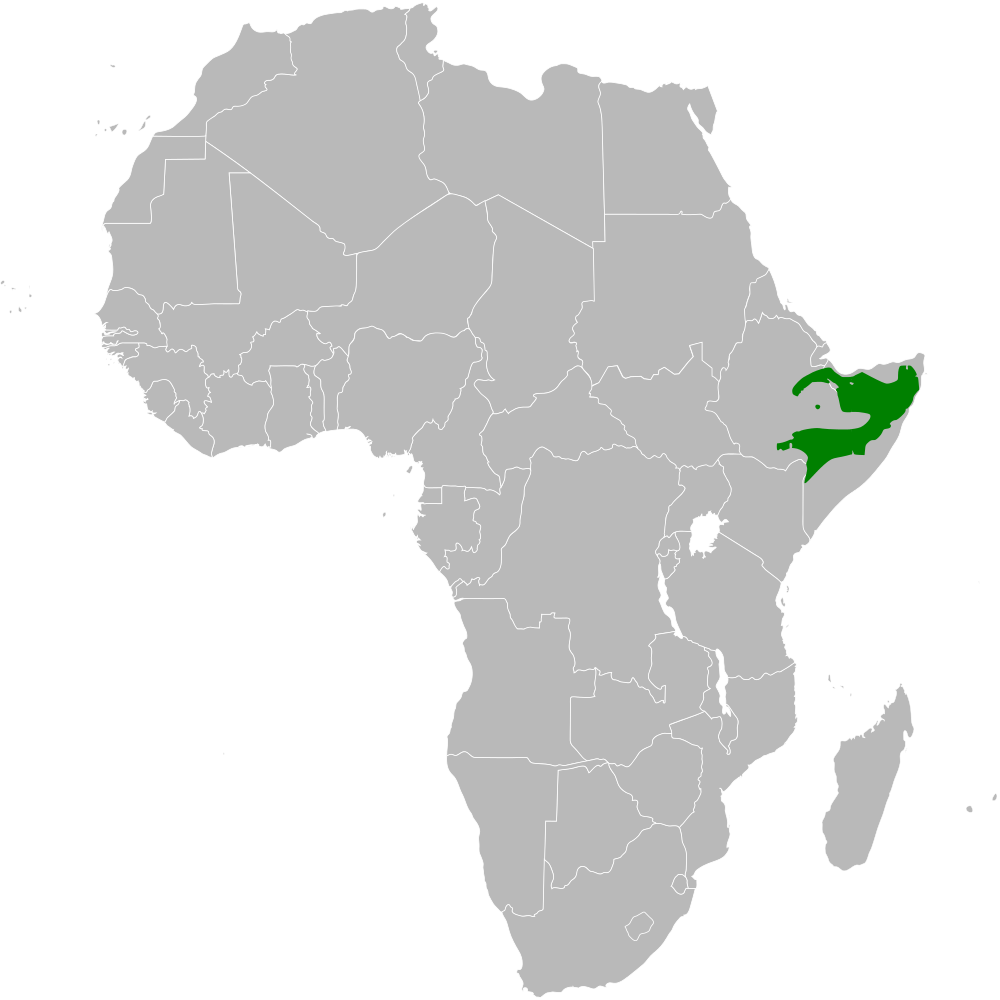
- resident range

= Gillett's lark =

Species of bird

Gillett's lark (Calendulauda gilletti) or Gillett's bushlark is a species of lark in the family Alaudidae found in eastern Africa.

== Taxonomy ==
Gillett's lark was formerly placed in the genus Mirafra. It was moved to Calendulauda based on its vocalizations and plumage combined with the results of a large molecular genetic study of the Alaudidae by Per Alström and collaborators that was published in 2023.

Three subspecies are recognised:

- Calendulauda gillett gilletti (Sharpe, 1895) – east Ethiopia and northwest Somalia
- Calendulauda gillett degodiensis (Érard, 1976) – southeast Ethiopia (Degodi lark)
- Calendulauda gillett arorihensis (Érard, 1976) – central Somalia to northeast Kenya

== Distribution and habitat ==
Gillett's lark has a somewhat wide range, with an estimated global extent of occurrence of 690,000 km^{2} (266,410 sq mi) over Ethiopia, Kenya, and Somalia.

Its natural habitats are dry savannah and subtropical or tropical dry shrubland.

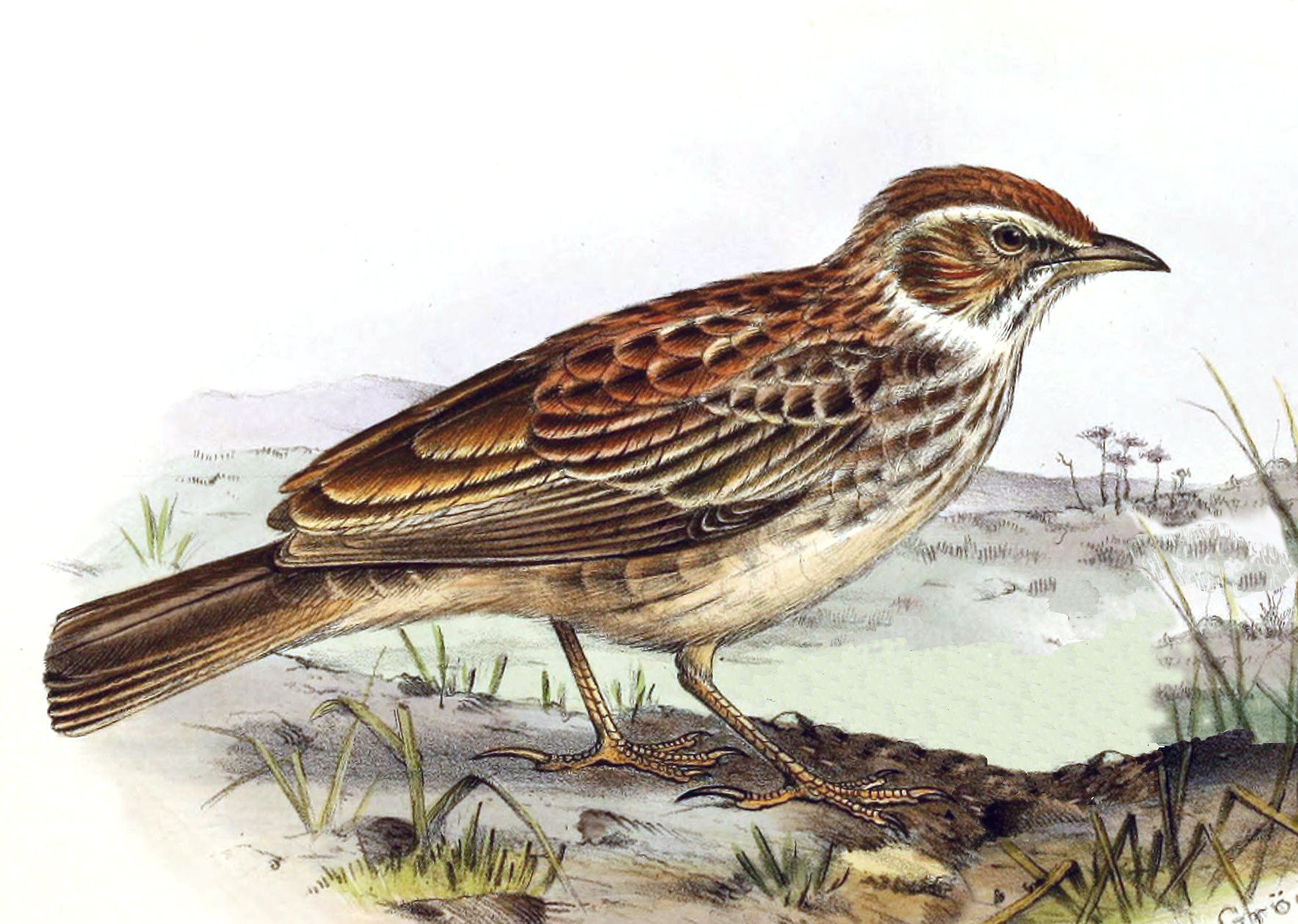
Illustration by Henrik Grønvold
