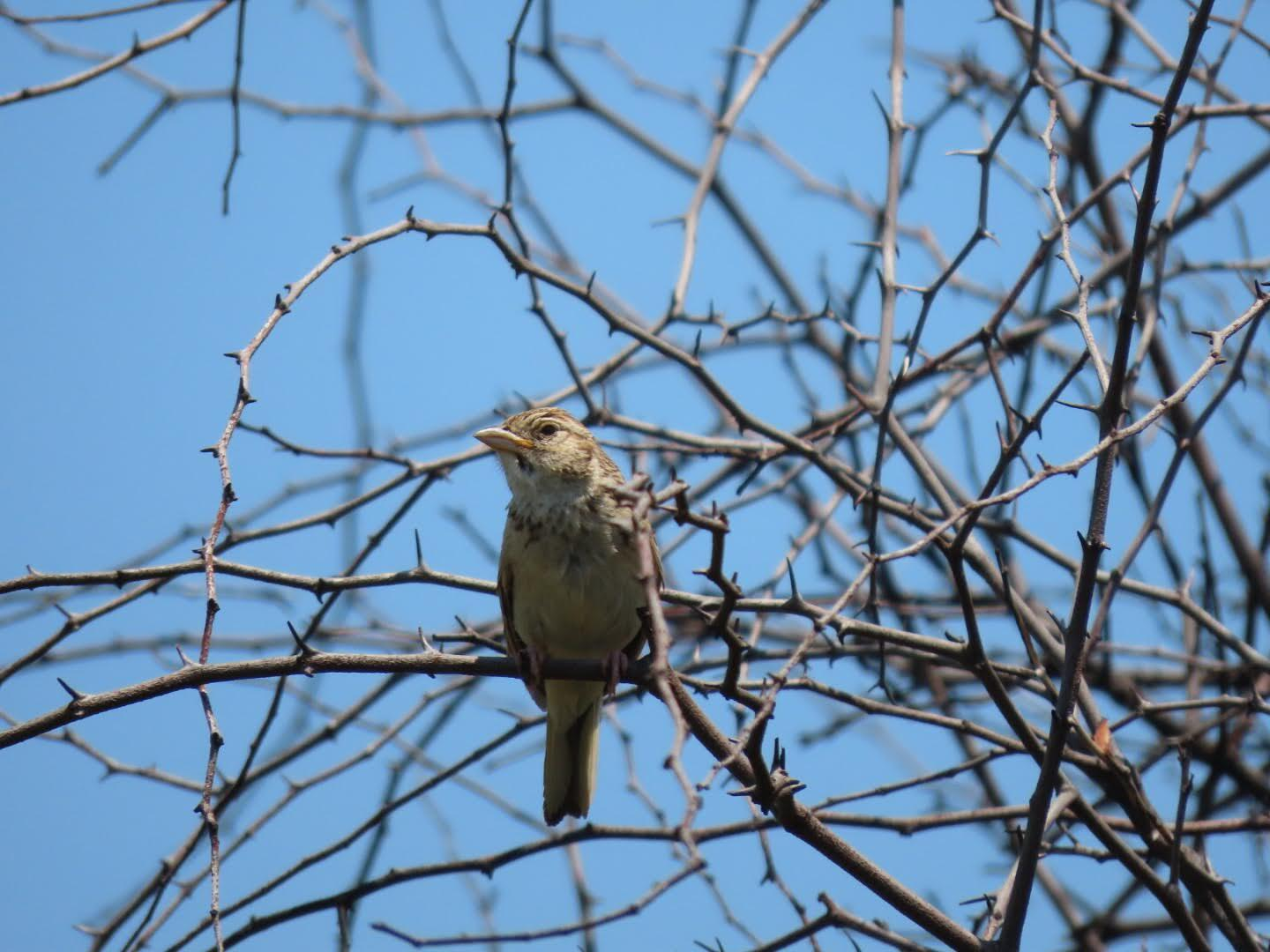

Conservation status
- Least Concern (IUCN 3.1)

Scientific classification
- Kingdom: Animalia
- Phylum: Chordata
- Class: Aves
- Order: Passeriformes
- Family: Alaudidae
- Genus: Mirafra
- Species: M. cheniana

Binomial name
- Mirafra cheniana Smith, 1843
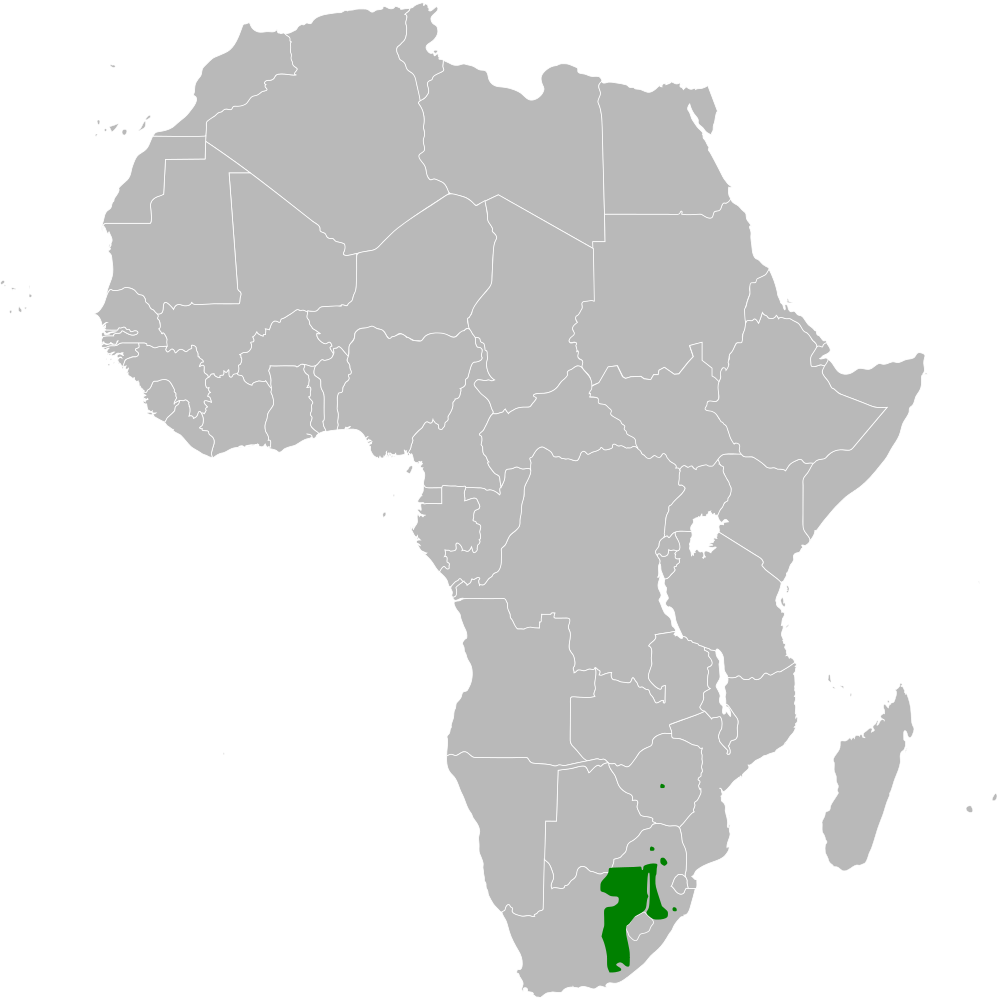
- Range

= Melodious lark =

Species of bird

The melodious lark (Mirafra cheniana) is a species of lark in the family Alaudidae found in southern Africa. It is currently threatened by habitat loss.

== Taxonomy and systematics ==
The alternate name of singing bush lark usually refers to the species of that name, Mirafra cantillans. Other alternate names for the melodious lark include: Latakoo lark, Latakoo bush lark, melodious bushlark, singing bush lark, Southern lark, Southern singing bush lark and Southern singing lark.

== Distribution and habitat ==
The melodious lark has a probable maximum range of 110,400 square kilometres (42,600 sq mi), separated into many disjunct populations located in South Africa (Eastern Cape, the Free State, Gauteng, KwaZulu-Natal, Limpopo, and North West Province), Botswana and Zimbabwe. At times, local populations will abandon one area for another when the regular dry-season fires occur.

=== Habitat ===
The natural habitat of the melodious lark is subtropical or tropical, seasonally wet or flooded, lowland grassland. Within these regions, it prefers the drier slopes, especially in open runs between grassy tussocks.

Melodious larks select different textures of grass or grass parts to build their domed, obliquely-accessed nests. They use the harder and more fibrous grasses and stalks for an outer thatch, while the finer and softer grasses or grass leaves are used to line the nest's interior.

== Behaviour and ecology ==
=== Breeding ===
The melodious lark is assessed as likely to be both territorial and monogamous, and lays a clutch of 2-4 eggs. It is generally resident, breeding from September to March. The level of breeding activity varies depending on locality. The most active period in South Africa is between November and January, while in Zimbabwe it is from January to March.

=== Food and feeding ===
The melodious lark forages on the ground for food, eating mostly grass seeds supplemented with insects.
