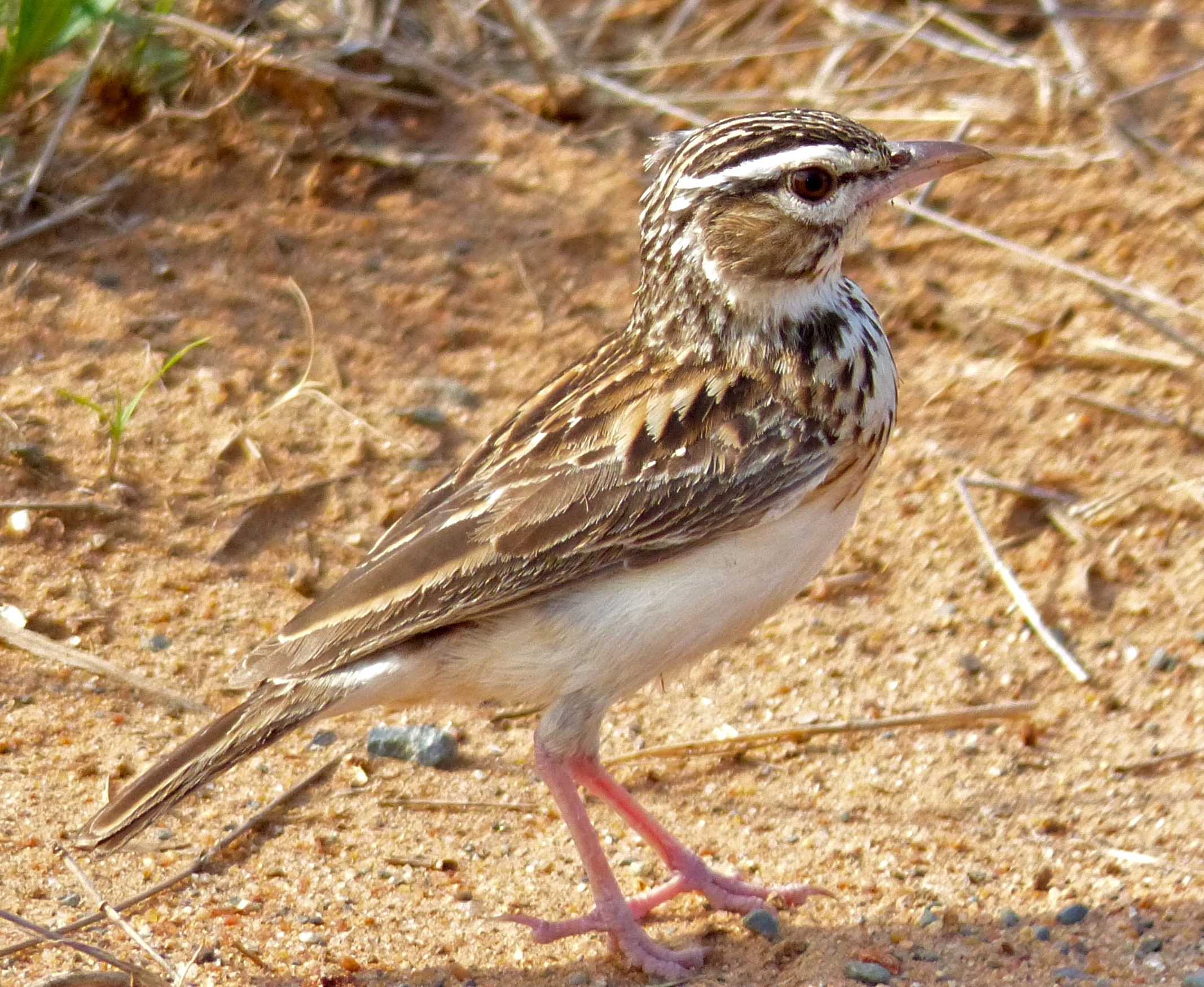
- Calendulauda sabota suffusca in the Kruger NP

Conservation status
- Least Concern (IUCN 3.1)

Scientific classification
- Kingdom: Animalia
- Phylum: Chordata
- Class: Aves
- Order: Passeriformes
- Family: Alaudidae
- Genus: Calendulauda
- Species: C. sabota

Binomial name
- Calendulauda sabota (Smith, 1836)

Subspecies
- See text
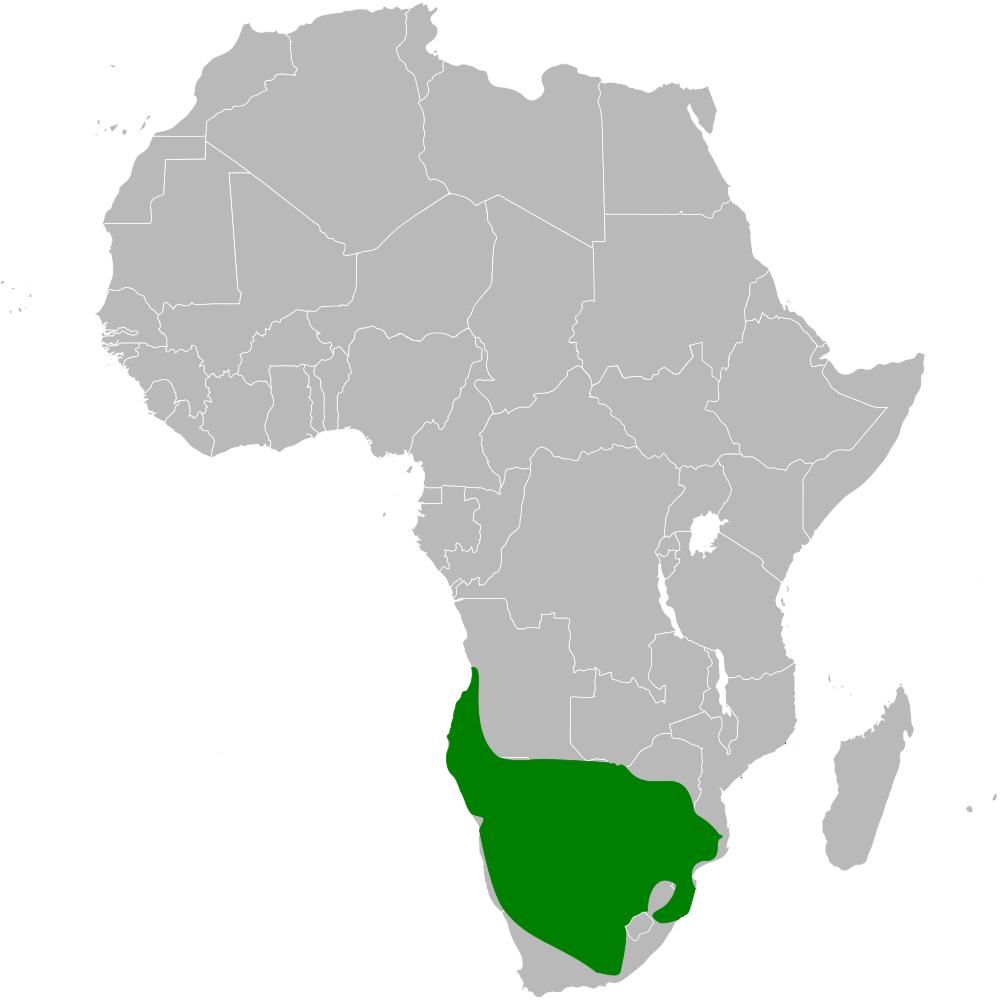
- range

Synonyms
- Mirafra sabota

Audio
- Call of Calendulauda sabota sabota at Dinokeng GR

= Sabota lark =

Species of bird

The sabota lark (Calendulauda sabota) is a species of lark in the family Alaudidae. It is found in southern Africa in its natural habitats of dry savannah, moist savannah, and subtropical or tropical dry shrubland. It is generally sedentary but local movements occur in drier regions. The species name is derived from sebotha or sebothé, the Tswana generic name for a lark.

== Taxonomy and systematics ==
Formerly, the Sabota lark was classified as belonging to the genus Mirafra until moved to Calendulauda in 2009. Not all authorities have followed this re-classification. Two distinctive taxa of this species are respectively known as the large-billed Sabota lark and small-billed Sabota lark. The large-billed subspecies are found in the dry to arid west and south of its range, while the small-billed subspecies are native to mesic woodlands of the north and east.

=== Subspecies ===
Nine subspecies are recognized:

- Congo Sabota lark C. s. plebeja (Cabanis, 1875) — Originally described as a separate species in the genus Alauda. Found on the Cabinda coast of north-western Angola
- Benguella Sabota lark C. s. ansorgei (Sclater, WL, 1926) — Found in western Angola
- Bradfield's lark C. s. naevia (Strickland, 1853) — Formerly, some authorities considered it to be a separate species in Calendulauda or Mirafra. Found in north-western Namibia. It has a larger bill than the other subspecies of C. sabota. Several other terms have been used to name this subspecies including Damaraland Sabota lark, large-billed lark (not to be confused with another species of the same name, Galerida magnirostris) and Somali fawn-coloured lark. The common name commemorates South African naturalist R. D. Bradfield.
- Ovampo Sabota lark C. s. waibeli (Grote, 1922) — Found in northern Namibia and northern Botswana
- C. s. herero (Roberts, 1936) — Found in southern and eastern Namibia, north-western South Africa. Confusingly, this subspecies is also sometimes referred to as Bradfield's lark.
- C. s. sabota (Smith, 1836) — Found in eastern Botswana, central Zimbabwe and north-eastern South Africa
- C. s. sabotoides (Roberts, 1932) — Found in central and southern Botswana, western Zimbabwe and northern South Africa
- C. s. suffusca (Clancey, 1958) — Found in south-eastern Zimbabwe, southern Mozambique and eastern South Africa
- C. s. bradfieldi (Roberts, 1928) — Found in central South Africa

== Gallery ==
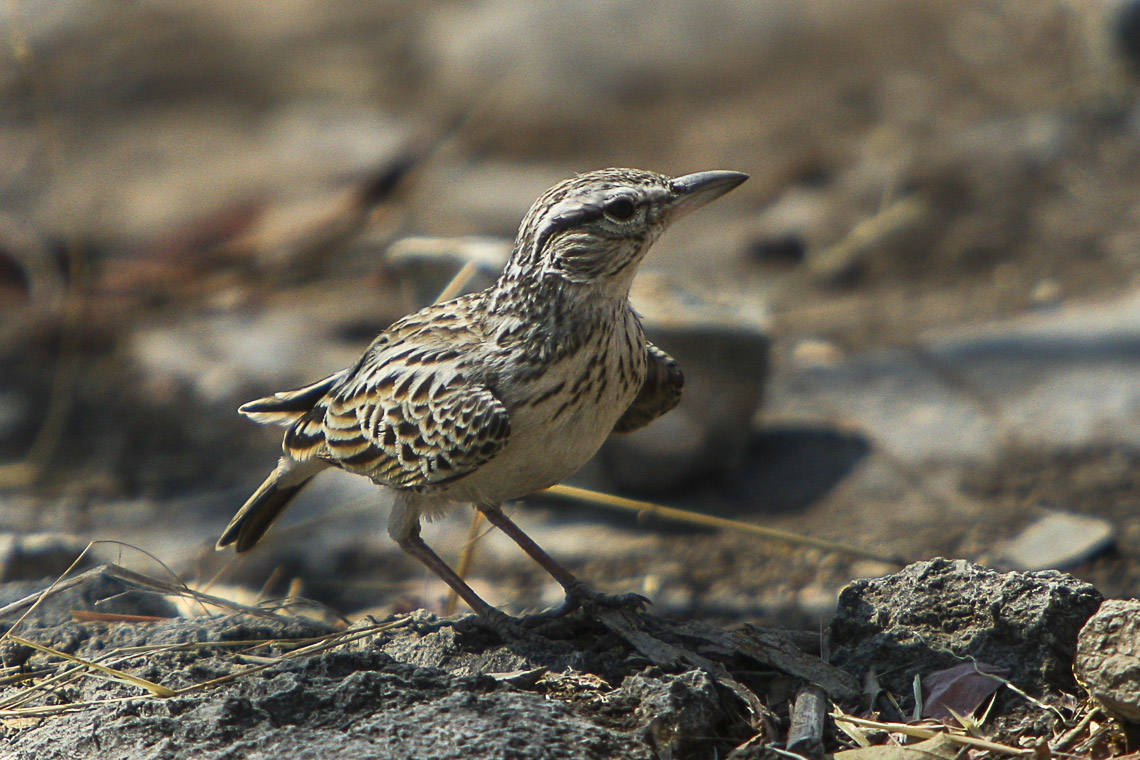
C. s. herero in Etosha National Park, Namibia
(large-billed)

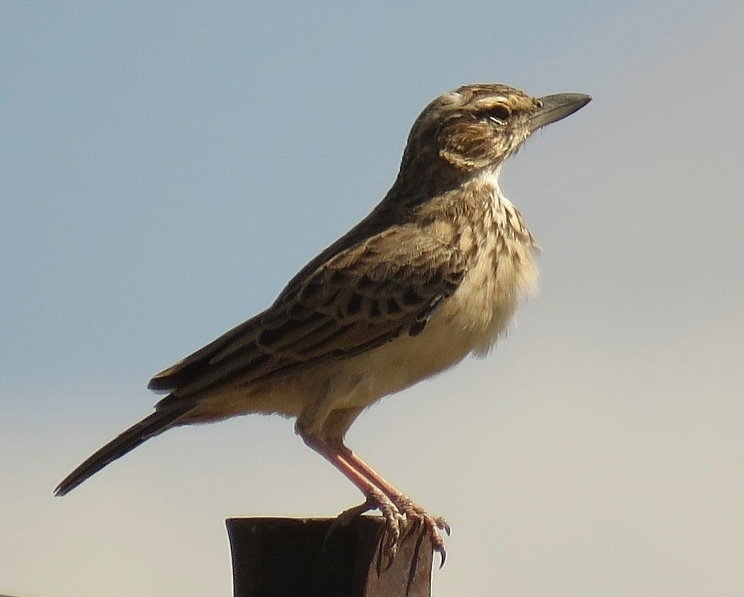
C. s. bradfieldi near Ritchie, N. Cape
(large-billed)

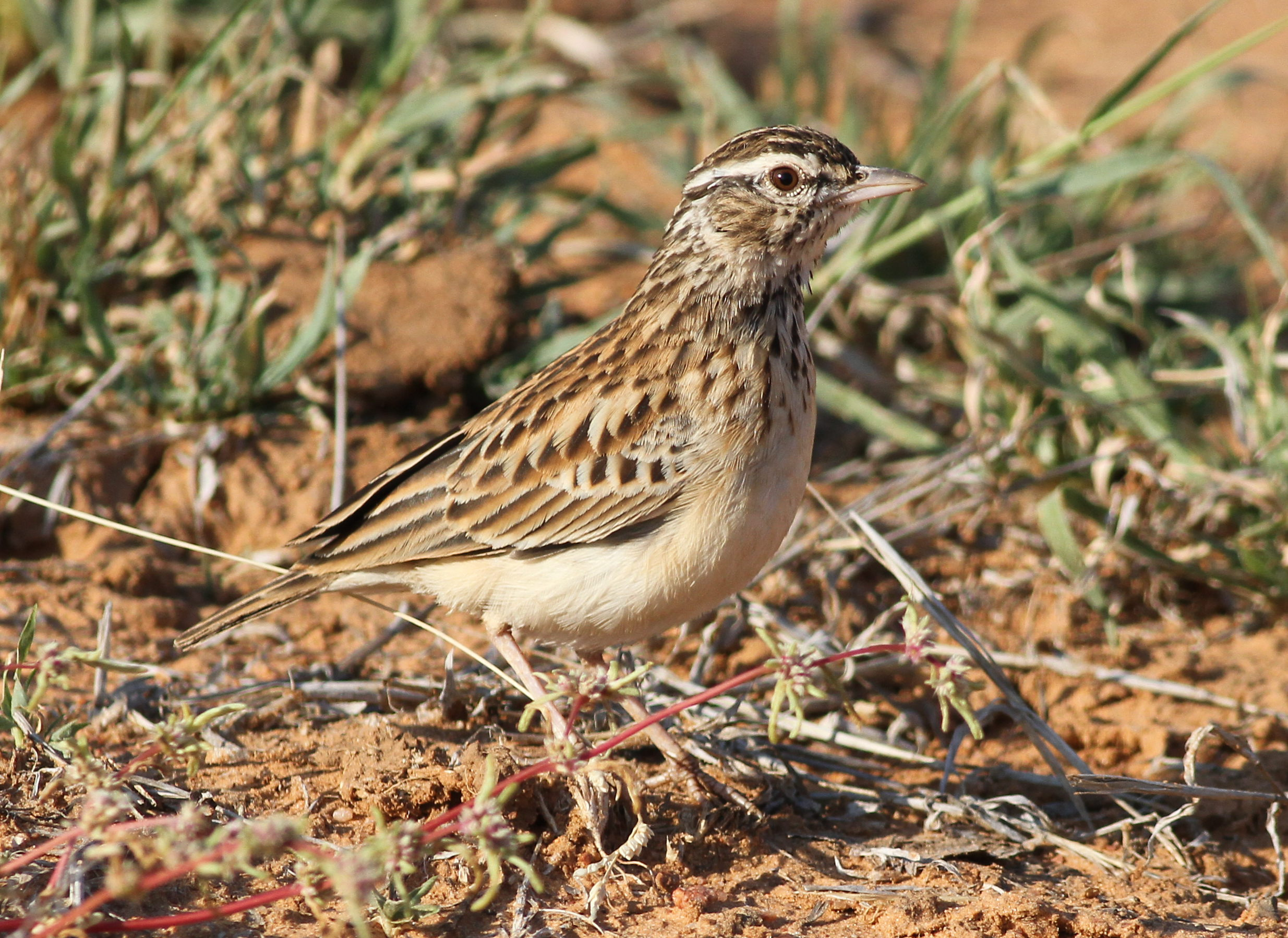
C. s. sabotoides at Mapungubwe, Limpopo
(small-billed)

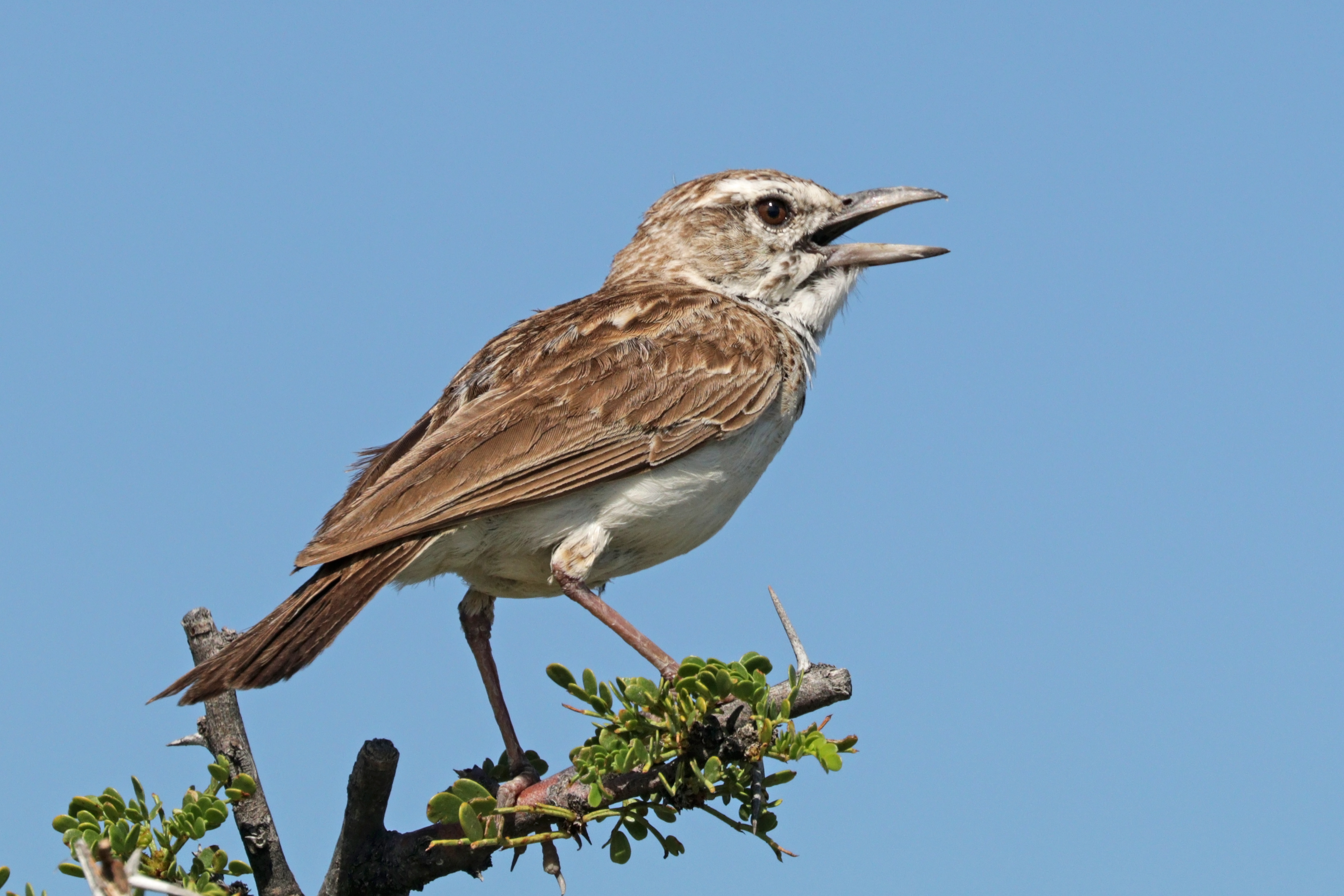
cf. C. s. waibeli, in Etosha National Park, Namibia
(small-billed)
