= Williams's lark =

Conservation status
- Least Concern (IUCN 3.1)

Scientific classification
- Kingdom: Animalia
- Phylum: Chordata
- Class: Aves
- Order: Passeriformes
- Family: Alaudidae
- Genus: Mirafra
- Species: M. williamsi

Binomial name
- Mirafra williamsi Macdonald, 1956
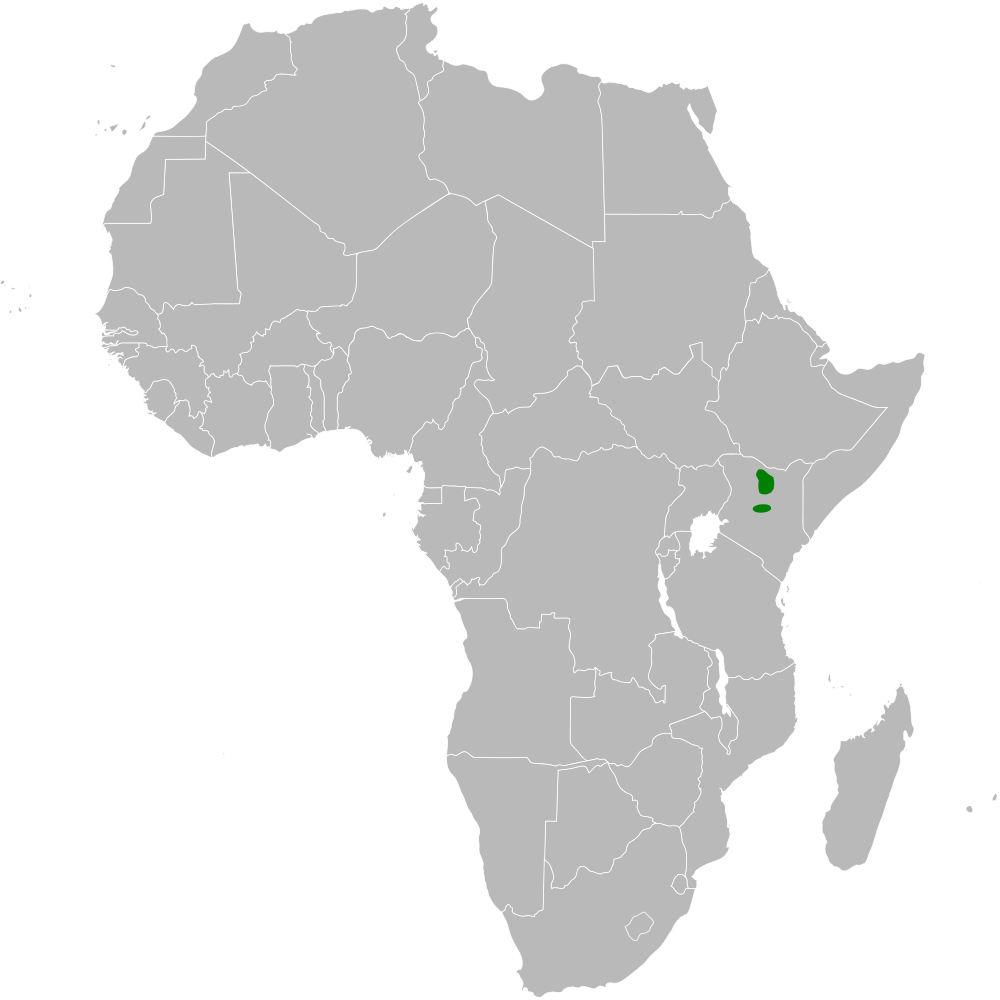

Species of bird

Williams's lark (Mirafra williamsi) is a species of lark in the family Alaudidae. Discovered in 1955, much of its life and ecology is still a mystery to ornithology.

== Taxonomy and systematics ==
The bird is named after John George Williams (1913–1997) a British ornithologist who was curator of the Coryndon Museum in Nairobi, Kenya (now called the National Museums of Kenya). Alternate names for Williams's lark include Marsabit lark and Williams's bush lark.

== Distribution and habitat ==
In general, the natural habitat of M. williamsi is subtropical or tropical dry shrubland. Its range is restricted to northern Kenya where it is found in two disjunct populations:

One population is located north of Marsabit, in the Didi Galgalla desert, a region marked by plains of rocky, red lava soils and patches of short-grass and bushes.

The other inhabits a particular area (elevated between 600 m and 1,350 m) lying between Isiolo and Garba Tula. It has even, unbroken communities of Barleria shrubs.

== Behaviour and ecology ==
The males of the species perform long, drawn-out, conspicuous song-flights above their territories after the rains at dawn, making them easy to find at this time.

=== Food and feeding ===
Williams's larks consume various seeds and insects.
