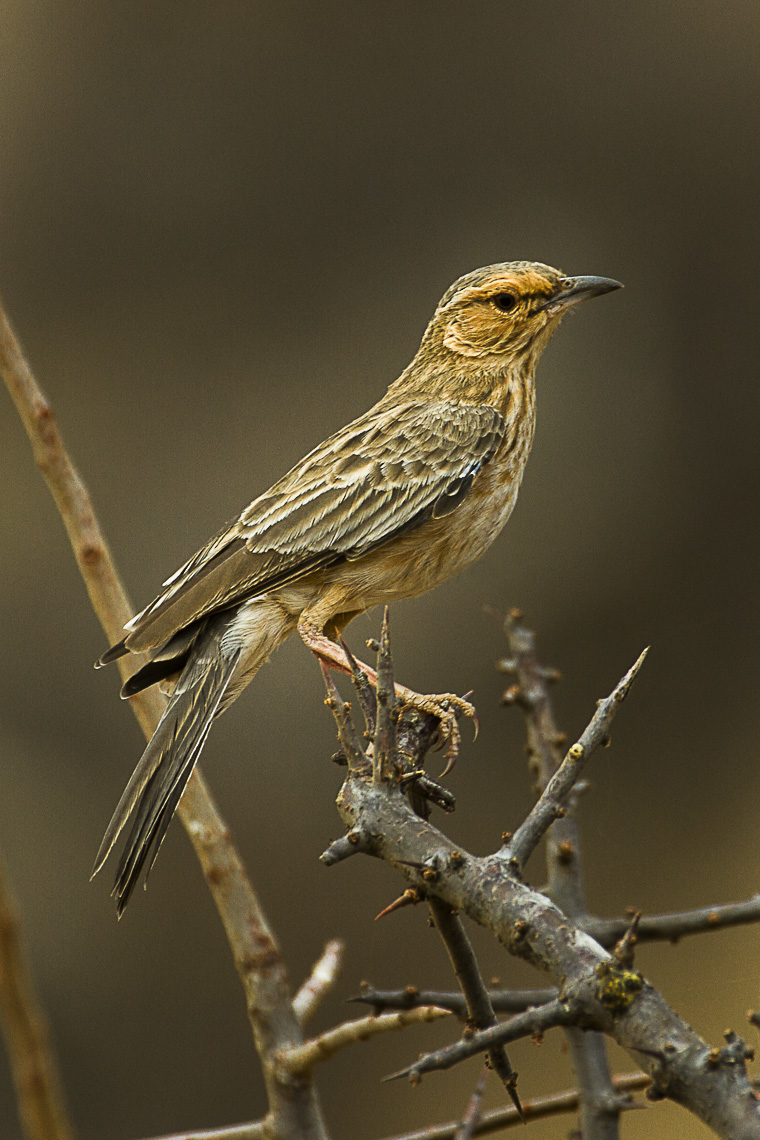

Conservation status
- Least Concern (IUCN 3.1)

Scientific classification
- Kingdom: Animalia
- Phylum: Chordata
- Class: Aves
- Order: Passeriformes
- Family: Alaudidae
- Genus: Calendulauda
- Species: C. poecilosterna

Binomial name
- Calendulauda poecilosterna (Reichenow, 1879)
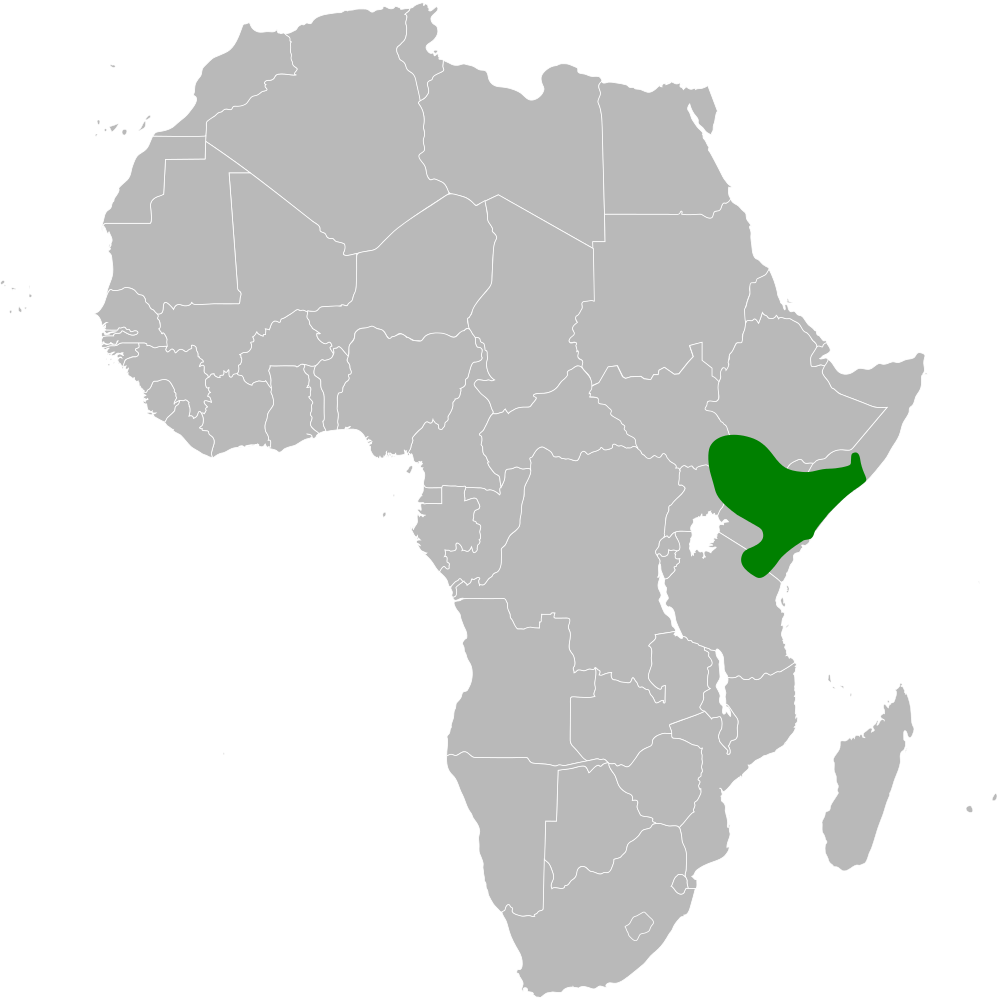

Synonyms
- Alauda poecilosterna; Mirafra poecilosterna

= Pink-breasted lark =

Species of bird

The pink-breasted lark (Calendulauda poecilosterna) or pink-breasted bushlark is a species of passerine bird in the family Alaudidae.

== Taxonomy and systematics ==
This species was originally classified in the genus Alauda and then Mirafra until moved to the new genus Calendulauda in 2009 by the IOC. Not all authorities have followed this taxonomy change.

== Distribution and habitat ==
The pink-breasted lark is estimated to have a global extent of occurrence of 560,000 km^{2}, covering a broad range from south-eastern South Sudan and southern Ethiopia through Kenya to southern Somalia, north-eastern Tanzania and eastern Uganda.

Its natural habitat is dry savannah, open bush and wooded areas, in particular dry acacia and Commiphora scrub.

== Behaviour and ecology ==
It is generally found singly or in pairs foraging on the ground for insects and seeds. When disturbed it flies to a safe, elevated position on the branch of a tree or the top of a bush. These are also its favoured perches for engaging in territorial song.
