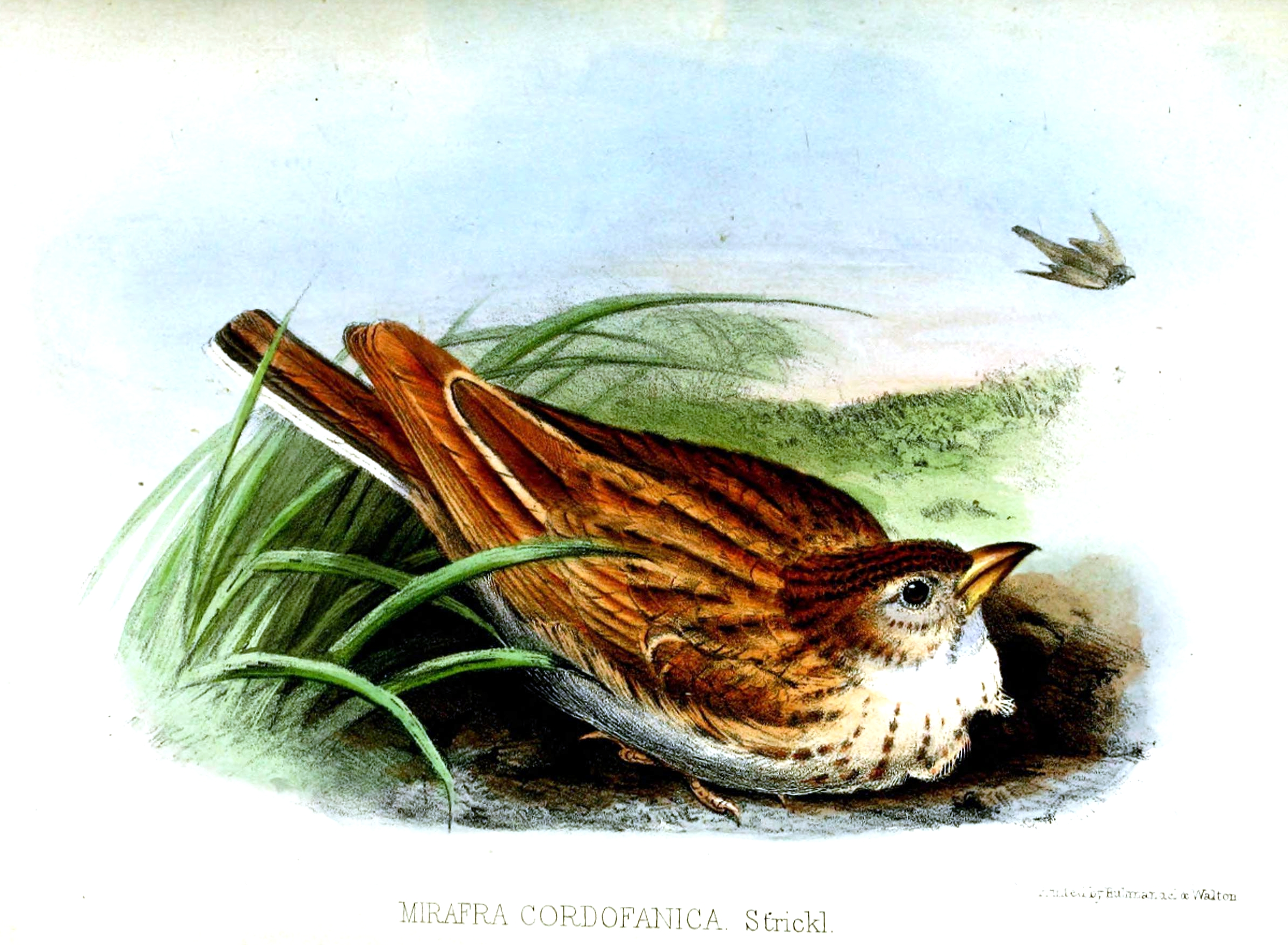

Conservation status
- Least Concern (IUCN 3.1)

Scientific classification
- Kingdom: Animalia
- Phylum: Chordata
- Class: Aves
- Order: Passeriformes
- Family: Alaudidae
- Genus: Mirafra
- Species: M. cordofanica

Binomial name
- Mirafra cordofanica Strickland, 1852
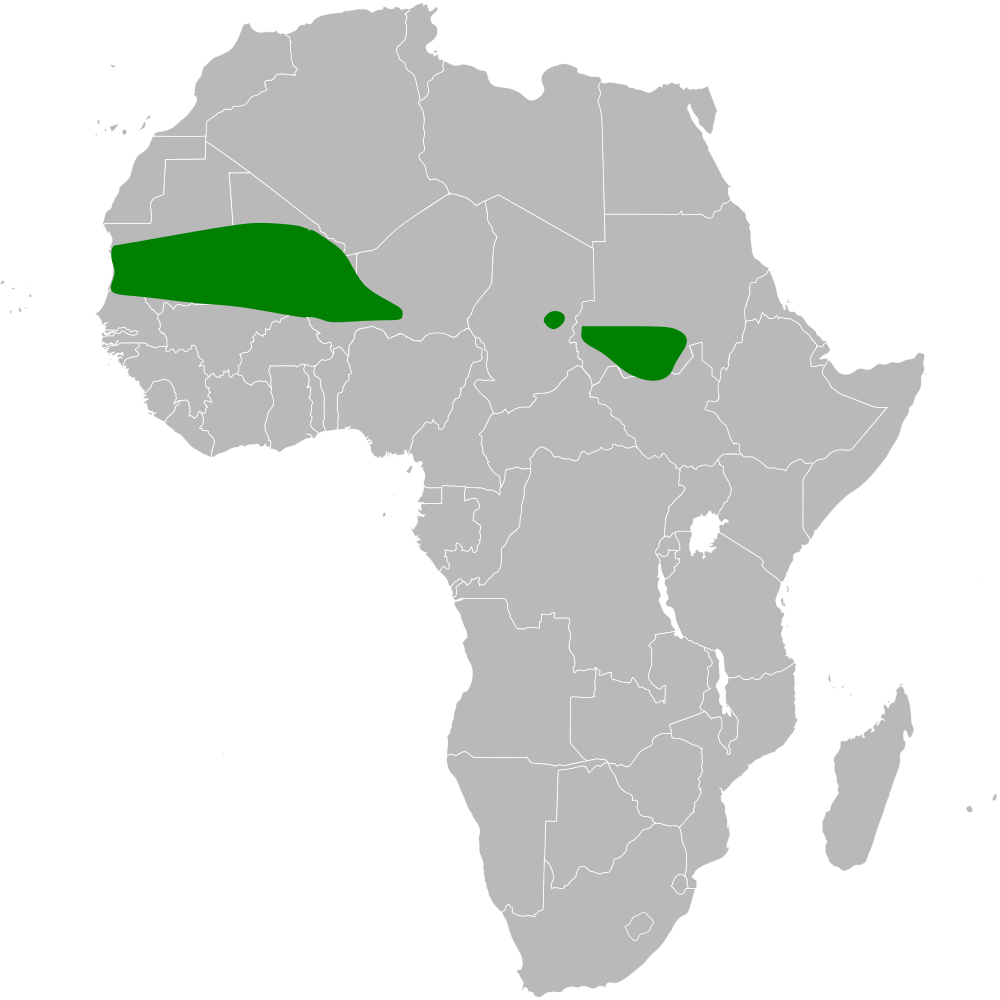

= Kordofan lark =

African species of lark

Kordofan lark (Mirafra cordofanica) is a species of lark in the family Alaudidae found in Africa.

== Taxonomy and systematics ==
Alternate names for the Kordofan lark include golden lark, Kordofan bush lark and Kordofan singing bushlark.

== Distribution and habitat ==
The Kordofan lark has a large range that spans the continent from Mauritania and Senegal to Niger, eastern Chad, southern Sudan and northern South Sudan. Its global extent of occurrence is estimated at 1,900,000 km^{2}.

Its natural habitats are subtropical or tropical dry shrubland and subtropical or tropical dry lowland grassland.
