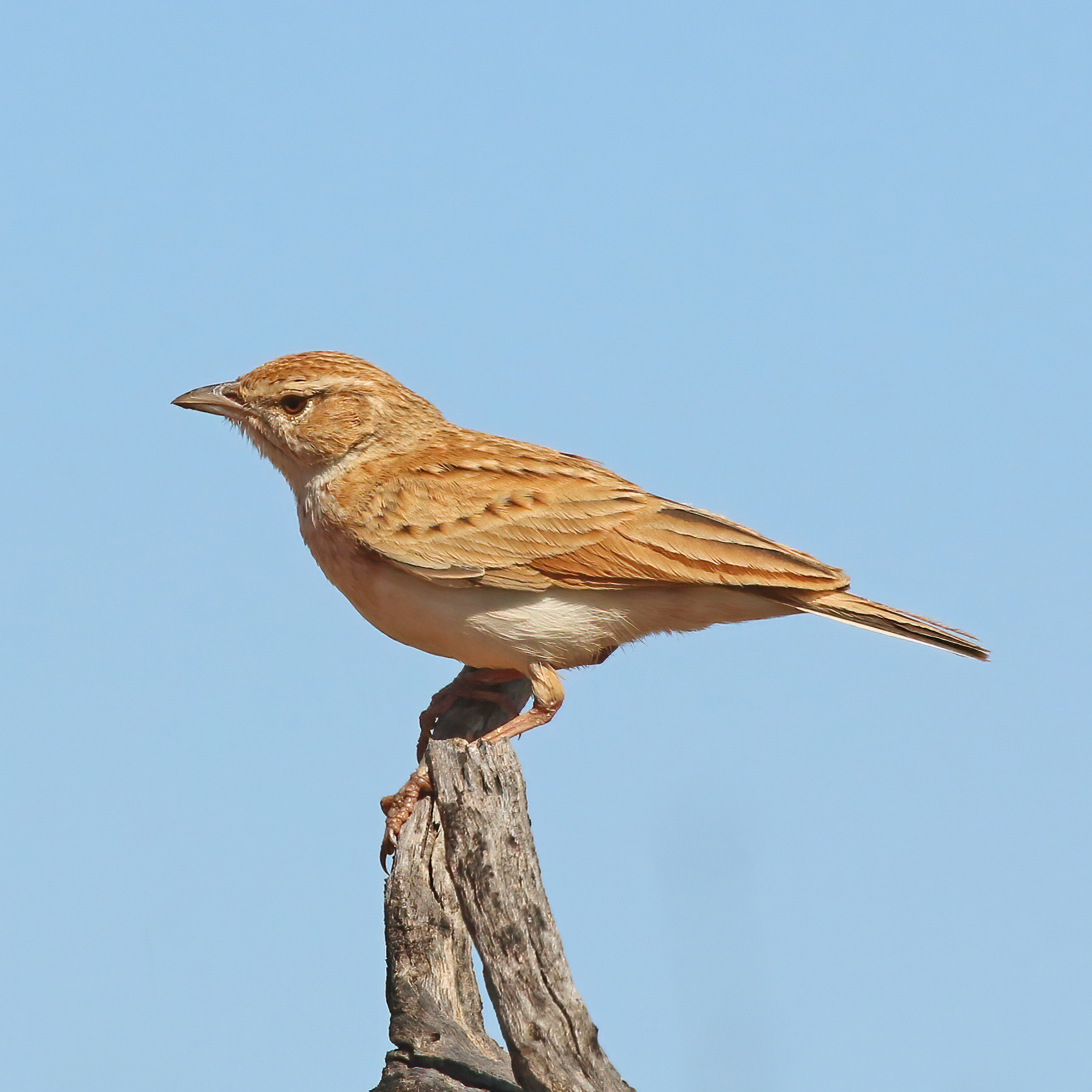
- in South Africa

Conservation status
- Least Concern (IUCN 3.1)

Scientific classification
- Kingdom: Animalia
- Phylum: Chordata
- Class: Aves
- Order: Passeriformes
- Family: Alaudidae
- Genus: Calendulauda
- Species: C. africanoides

Binomial name
- Calendulauda africanoides (Smith A, 1836)

Synonyms
- Mirafra africanoides

= Fawn-coloured lark =

Species of bird

The fawn-coloured lark (Calendulauda africanoides) or fawn-coloured bush-lark is a species of lark in the family Alaudidae. It is found in south-central Africa.

== Taxonomy and systematics ==
Formerly, the fawn-coloured lark was classified as belonging to the genus Mirafra until moved to Calendulauda in 2009.

=== Subspecies ===
Eight subspecies are recognised:

- C. a. intercedens (Reichenow, 1895) – east, south Ethiopia and west Somalia to east Uganda, Kenya and north Tanzania
- C. a. alopex (Sharpe, 1890) – extreme east Ethiopia and north Somalia
- C. a. trapnelli (White, CMN, 1943) – southeast Angola and southwest Zambia
- C. a. harei (Roberts, 1917) – central Namibia to southwest Botswana and northwest South Africa
- C. a. makarikari (Roberts, 1932) – southwest Angola and north Namibia to west Zambia and north, central Botswana
- C. a. sarwensis (Roberts, 1932) – west Botswana, east Namibia and central north South Africa
- C. a. vincenti (Roberts, 1938) – central Zimbabwe and south Mozambique
- C. a. africanoides (Smith, A, 1836) – south Namibia, south, east Botswana, southwest Zimbabwe and north South Africa

The subspecies C. a. intercedens and C. a. alopex were formerly separated as the foxy lark. They were lumped with the fawn-colored lark based on the results of a large 2024 molecular genetic study of the Alaudidae by Per Alström and collaborators that found only shallow genetic divergence.

== Distribution and habitat ==
The range of the fawn-coloured lark is broadly spread, with an estimated global extent of occurrence of 2,400,000 km^{2}. It can be found in the countries of Angola, Botswana, Ethiopia, Kenya, Mozambique, Namibia, Somalia, South Africa, Tanzania, Uganda, Zambia, and Zimbabwe.
