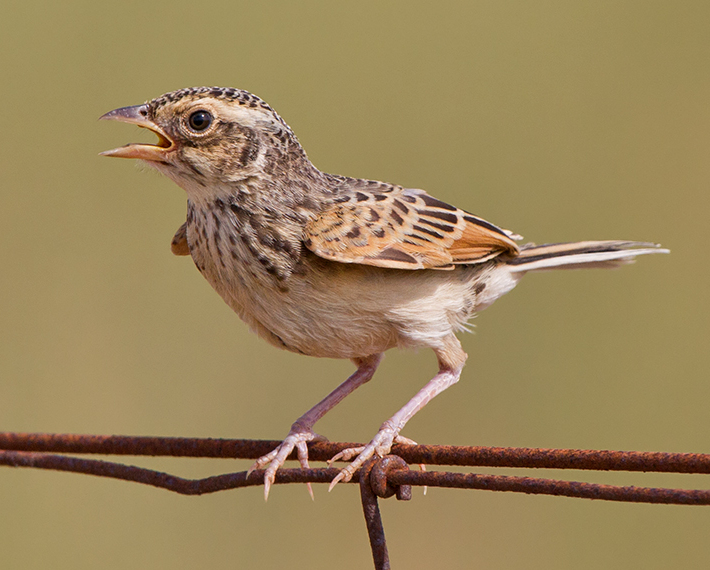
- Singing bush lark (Mirafra javanica)

Scientific classification
- Kingdom: Animalia
- Phylum: Chordata
- Class: Aves
- Order: Passeriformes
- Family: Alaudidae
- Genus: Mirafra; Horsfield, 1821

Type species
- Mirafra javanica Singing bush lark Horsfield, 1821

Synonyms
- Geocoraphus; Megalophonus; Spilocorydon

= Mirafra =

Genus of birds

Mirafra is a genus of lark in the family Alaudidae. Some Mirafra species are called "larks", while others are called "bush larks". They are all found in Africa except for the singing bush lark that is found through South Asia to Australia.

== Taxonomy ==
The genus Mirafra was introduced in 1821 by the American naturalist Thomas Horsfield to accommodate a single species, Mirafra javanica the singing bush lark, which is therefore considered as the type species. The derivation of the genus name is unknown.

A 2023 molecular phylogenetic study of the lark family Alaudidae by the Swedish ornithologist Per Alström and his collaborators found that the genus Mirafra contained deep internal genetic divergences. They therefore split Mirafra into four genera, each corresponding to a major clade. Species were moved to Plocealauda, Amirafra and Corypha leaving only seven species remaining in Mirafra.

=== Extant species ===
The genus contains seven species:

Image	Scientific name	Common name	Distribution
	Mirafra passerina	Monotonous lark	southern Africa.
	Mirafra pulpa	Friedmann's lark	East Africa.
	Mirafra cordofanica	Kordofan lark	Mauritania and Senegal to Niger, eastern Chad, southern Sudan and northern South Sudan
	Mirafra williamsi	Williams's lark	northern Kenya
	Mirafra javanica	Singing bush lark	Australia and much of Southeast Asia.
	Mirafra cheniana	Melodious lark	South Africa (Eastern Cape, the Free State, Gauteng, KwaZulu-Natal, Limpopo, and North West Province), Botswana and Zimbabwe
	Mirafra albicauda	White-tailed lark	western Chad, eastern Sudan, northeastern South Sudan, south-central Ethiopia, and from Uganda and western Kenya to central Tanzania

=== Former species ===
Some authorities, either presently or formerly, recognize several additional species as belonging to the genus Mirafra, including:

- Short-clawed lark (as Mirafra chuana)
- Dusky lark (as Mirafra nigricans)
- Rufous-rumped lark (as Mirafra erythropygia or Mirafra nigricans erythropygia)
- Indian desert finch-lark (as Mirafra phoenicuroides)
- Rufous-tailed lark (as Mirafra phoenicura)
- Madagascan lark (as Mirafra hova)
- Sabota lark (as Mirafra sabota)
- Bradfield's lark (as Mirafra naevia)
- Pink-breasted lark (as Mirafra poecilosterna)
- Foxy lark (as Mirafra alopex)
- Masai fawn-coloured lark (as Mirafra intercedens)
- Fawn-coloured lark (as Mirafra africanoides)
- Karoo lark (as Mirafra albescens or Mirafra nivosa)
- Red lark (as Mirafra burra)
- Dune lark (as Mirafra erythrochlamys)
- Barlow's lark (as Mirafra erythrochlamys barlowi)
- Rudd's lark (as Mirafra ruddi)
- Archer's lark (as Mirafra archeri)
- Sidamo lark (as Mirafra sidamoensis)
- Ngaundere sun lark (as Mirafra strümpelli)
- Uele sun lark (as Mirafra bucolica)
