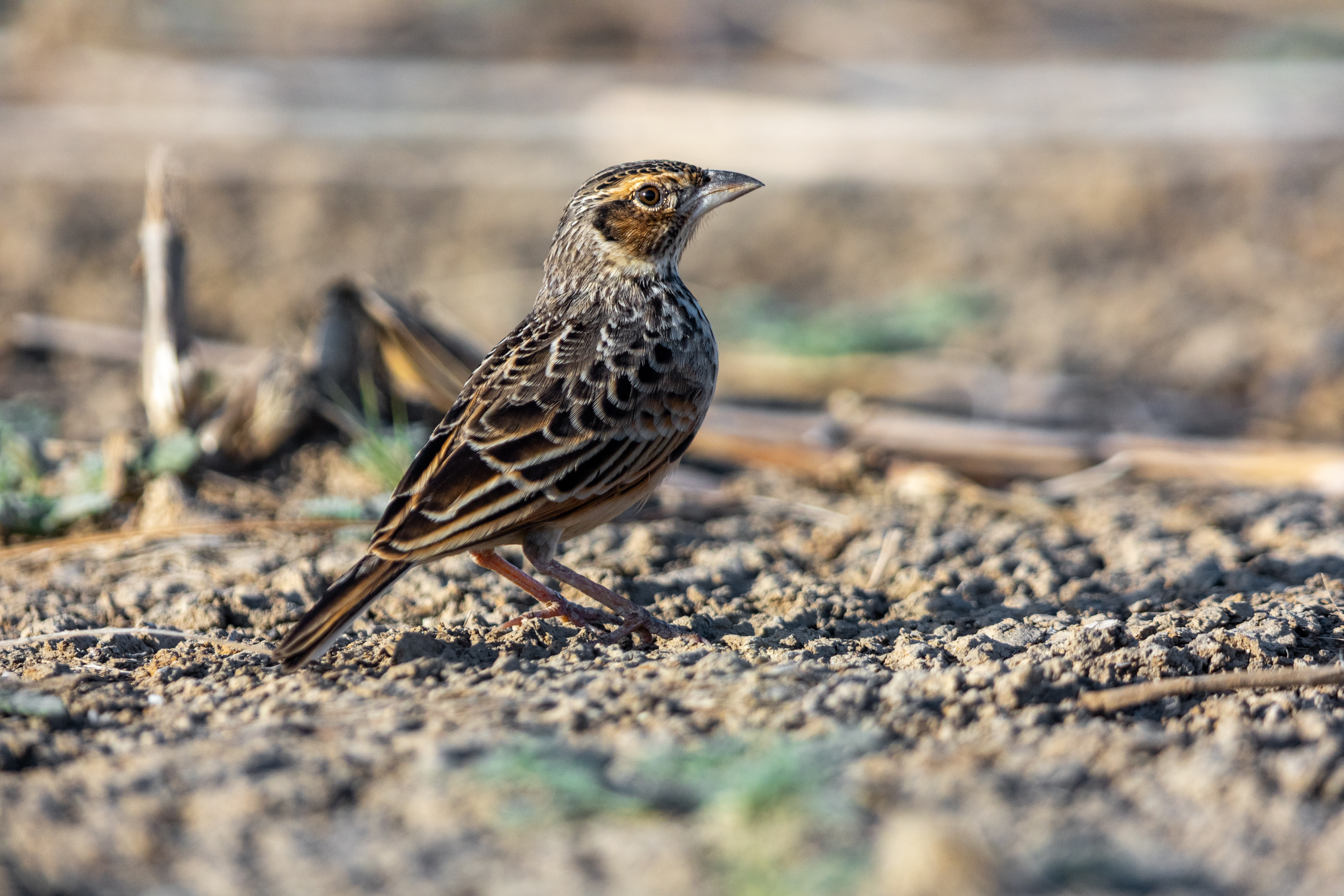

Conservation status
- Least Concern (IUCN 3.1)

Scientific classification
- Kingdom: Animalia
- Phylum: Chordata
- Class: Aves
- Order: Passeriformes
- Family: Alaudidae
- Genus: Mirafra
- Species: M. javanica

Binomial name
- Mirafra javanica Horsfield, 1821
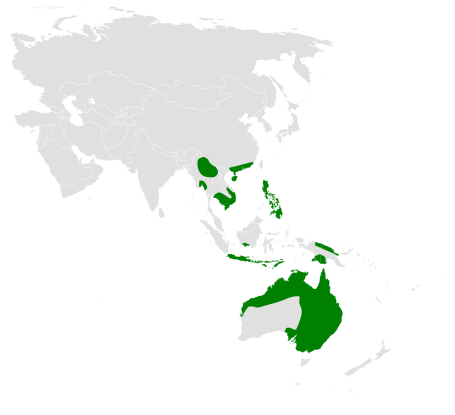
- Range of Mirafra javanica chadensis

= Singing bush lark =

Species of bird

The singing bush lark or Horsfield's bush lark (Mirafra javanica) is a species of lark which inhabits grassland throughout most of Australia and much of Southeast Asia. It was described by the American naturalist Thomas Horsfield.

== Taxonomy ==
The singing bush lark was formally described in 1821 by the American naturalist Thomas Horsfield from a specimen collected on the island of Java. He placed the lark in the genus Mirafra and coined the binomial name Mirafra javanica.

The singing bush lark is one of 100 species of larks of the rather large and fairly diverse family, Alaudidae. They are small to medium-small passerines, usually with rather drab, brownish plumage. Predominantly an Old World family, the species are distributed widely across Europe, Africa, Asia and the Indian subcontinent but the singing bush lark is the only species occurring naturally in Wallacea, New Guinea and Australia.

The alternate shortened name "bush-lark" can also refer to many of the other species in the genus Mirafra. The alternate name of "cinnamon bush lark" is also an alternate name for the flappet lark. Other alternate names for the singing bush lark include the Australasian bushlark, Australian lark, eastern bush lark, eastern lark, eastern singing bush lark, Horsfield's lark and Javan lark.

Morphologically, the family Alaudidae constitutes a well-defined group, whose members share unique features of the syrinx and tarsus. The syrinx lacks a pessulus, which is unique among oscines but occurs in many suboscine genera. They have a single fossa at the head of the humerus, rather than the double fossae of other passeroid songbirds, but typical of corvoid songbirds.

Linear classifications have generally placed them at the beginning of the oscine passerines whereas, based on DNA–DNA hybridization they were placed in the super-family, Passeroidea. However, recent studies based on sequence data, have unanimously shown them to be part of the super-family Sylvioidea. Together with the morphologically and ecologically radically different monotypic genus, Panurus (Panuridae), they form a sister clade to the rest of the Sylvioidea.

The widespread M. cantillans, which ranges from west Africa to India, and the similarly widely distributed M. javanica, from Myanmar to Australia are closely related and their separation is comparatively recent. These taxa have apparently spread over a vast area in a very short time, and are in the early stages of the speciation process. For larks, which inhabit mostly open habitats, cryptic plumages are evidently important. Consequently, the strength of streaking and colour shades appear to be particularly adaptable, reflecting the amount of vegetation cover (aridity) and substrate colour more than phylogeny.

=== Subspecies ===
Twenty subspecies are recognized:

- M. j. williamsoni - Baker, ECS, 1915: Originally described as a subspecies of the singing bush lark. Found from central Myanmar to southern China, central and south-central Thailand, Cambodia, central and southern Vietnam.
- M. j. philippinensis - Wardlaw-Ramsay, 1886: Originally described as a separate species. Found in northern Philippines
- M. j. mindanensis - Hachisuka, 1931: Found in southern Philippines
- M. j. javanica - Horsfield, 1821: Found in Borneo, Java and Bali
- M. j. parva - R. Swinhoe, 1871: Originally described as a separate species. Found in the western Lesser Sunda Islands
- M. j. timorensis - Mayr, 1944: Found in the eastern Lesser Sunda Islands
- M. j. aliena - Greenway, 1935: Found in northern and north-eastern New Guinea
- M. j. woodwardi - Milligan, 1901 (cinnamon lark): Originally described as a separate species. Found in extreme north-western Western Australia
- M. j. halli - Bianchi, 1907: Found in northern Western Australia
- M. j. forresti - Mayr & McEvey, 1960: Found in north-eastern Western Australia
- M. j. melvillensis - Mathews, 1912: Found on Melville and Bathurst Islands (off northern Australia)
- M. j. soderbergi - Mathews, 1921: Found in northern Northern Territory (northern Australia)
- M. j. rufescens - Ingram, W, 1906: Originally described as a separate species. Found in central Australia
- M. j. athertonensis - Schodde & Mason, IJ, 1999: Found in north-eastern Australia
- M. j. horsfieldii - Gould, 1847: Originally described as a separate species. Found in eastern and south-eastern Australia
- M. j. secunda - Sharpe, 1890: Originally described as a separate species. Found in south-central Australia
- M. j. marginata - Hawker, 1898: Found from southern Sudan to Somalia, Kenya and north-eastern Tanzania.
- M. j. chadensis - Alexander, 1908: Senegal to central Sudan and western Ethiopia
- M. j. simplex- (Heuglin, 1868): western, southern Arabia
- M. j. cantillans- Blyth, 1845: Pakistan, India, and Bangladesh

The subspecies cantillans, marginata, chadensis and simplex have sometimes been considered as a separate species, the singing bush lark Mirafra cantillans.

== Description ==
The singing bush lark is a small, thickset bird with a large head, a short, sparrow-like bill and a small crest which is only visible when raised. Its dorsal plumage colour is brown, reddish or sandy with darker central streaks to the feathers. The breast is mottled or streaked and it has a buff eyebrow. The underparts are pale, with a brown tail. The adult upper parts and crown are near black with coarse buff to russet streaking. Juveniles are similar but the crown and upper parts are neatly scaled by narrow white fringes to the feathers. Nestlings have dense natal down and contrasting dark spots on their tongue and mouth.

The average lengths for the wing are 61–81 mm, tail 40–56 mm, bill 12–16 mm and weight 18–25 grams. The wings are short and rounded with a distinctive rufous panel. The innermost secondary feather is vestigial and of the ten primary feathers, p10 is very short but not vestigial. The primaries moult outward starting at p1 while the tail and body moult during the early stages of, or just before the start of the moult of the primaries.

=== Similar species ===
In appearance and size the bushlark is very similar to the Australian pipit and can also be mistaken for a half-grown Eurasian skylark. The bush lark's wings lack the white trailing edge of the skylark while in flight, its tail is white-sided like the skylark and pipits, but is only half as long. Identification of the bush lark is usually obvious from its structure and the rufous wing panels however, this colouring can bleach to a buffish tone. When flushed the bush lark gives a slurred chirrup and the flight action is often sufficient for identification. With jerky wing beats, the head raised slightly, the tail depressed and before landing or dropping into cover, will briefly hover or flutter. By contrast, the Australian pipit has a more upright stance, a slimmer build and bill and struts purposefully on long legs. When standing the pipit persistently bobs its tail and in flight, drops into cover without hovering.

== Distribution and habitat ==
The range of the singing bush lark is very broad, with an estimated global extent of occurrence of 10,000,000 km^{2}. In Australia, the bush lark occurs from the Eyre Peninsula, South Australia, through Victoria, New South Wales, Queensland, Northern Territory and Western Australia to Shark Bay. This species is a summer migrant to south-eastern continental Australia and vagrant to the island of Tasmania. In Australia they inhabit chenopod shrublands, native and exotic grasslands in temperate and tropical areas, coastal heathlands, dunes, mudflats and also modified open habitats such as crop and pastureland. They are found less commonly on playing fields, golf courses, road verges, salt marshes and other shrublands or heathland and rarely in treed habitats.

== Behaviour and ecology ==
=== Breeding ===
In Australia the bush lark is known to breed following significant rainfall in arid areas. They defend territory during the breeding season and both parents incubate and feed the nestlings and fledglings and remove faecal sacs. The young remain in the nest for up to 12–14 days or longer but if disturbed, may depart the nest at 7–8 days old before they are capable of flight. For almost a month after fledging they are dependent on the parents. Nesting success can be low with most losses from introduced mammalian predators.

Of historical interest is an account written by ornithologist and former curator of the Australian Museum, Edward P. Ramsay. Published in the Proceedings of the Zoological Society of London in 1865 he described nidification of M. j. horsfieldii, "The nests of Mirafra horsfieldi are usually found during the months of November, December, and often as late as January and February. They are loose ragged structures, and not finished off nicely, like those of Anthus australis. They are cup-shaped, and are composed wholly of grasses, without any particular lining. The situation chosen is a little hollow scraped out by the side of a tuft of grass or straw, or behind a clod of earth; the front edge of the nest alone is smoothed down-the back part being left ragged, and often drawn forward as if to help to conceal the eggs. The nest is about 28 inches in diameter by 1 inch in depth. On the 4th of' February, 1861, we took a nest from a hay-field at M'Quarie Fields containing three eggs, which is the usual number. These are in length from 8 to 10 lines by from 6 to 7 in breadth, and of a light earthy brown, thickly marked over the whole surface with freckles of a much darker hue. Some specimens are darker in colour than others; and after a time the ground-colour becomes of a more yellowish tint, and the markings much duller and more indistinct."

=== Vocalisation ===
During the breeding period they sing any time of day or night, on the ground and low perches or in song-flights hovering high over territory. The bush lark can sustain a melodious song which is typically interspersed with skillful mimicry of many other species. An account from the 1930s suggested the following, "he possesses either a considerable memory or an ability to 'pirate' certain borrowed calls from brother-mimics. An instance of this is his rendering of the 'tink, tink' of Climacteris picumnus, which bird has long since vanished from the district. The notes, then, must have been either heard during migratory wanderings or 'cribbed' from the repertoire of another Lark".

=== Feeding ===
Bush larks are terrestrial and omnivorous foragers with a short, stout bill suited for crushing seeds. They eat mainly grass seeds and invertebrates, particularly insects during the breeding season. By gleaning and probing most food is taken from the ground surface or, just below. Mostly they forage alone, but sometimes are found in small parties.

== Gallery ==
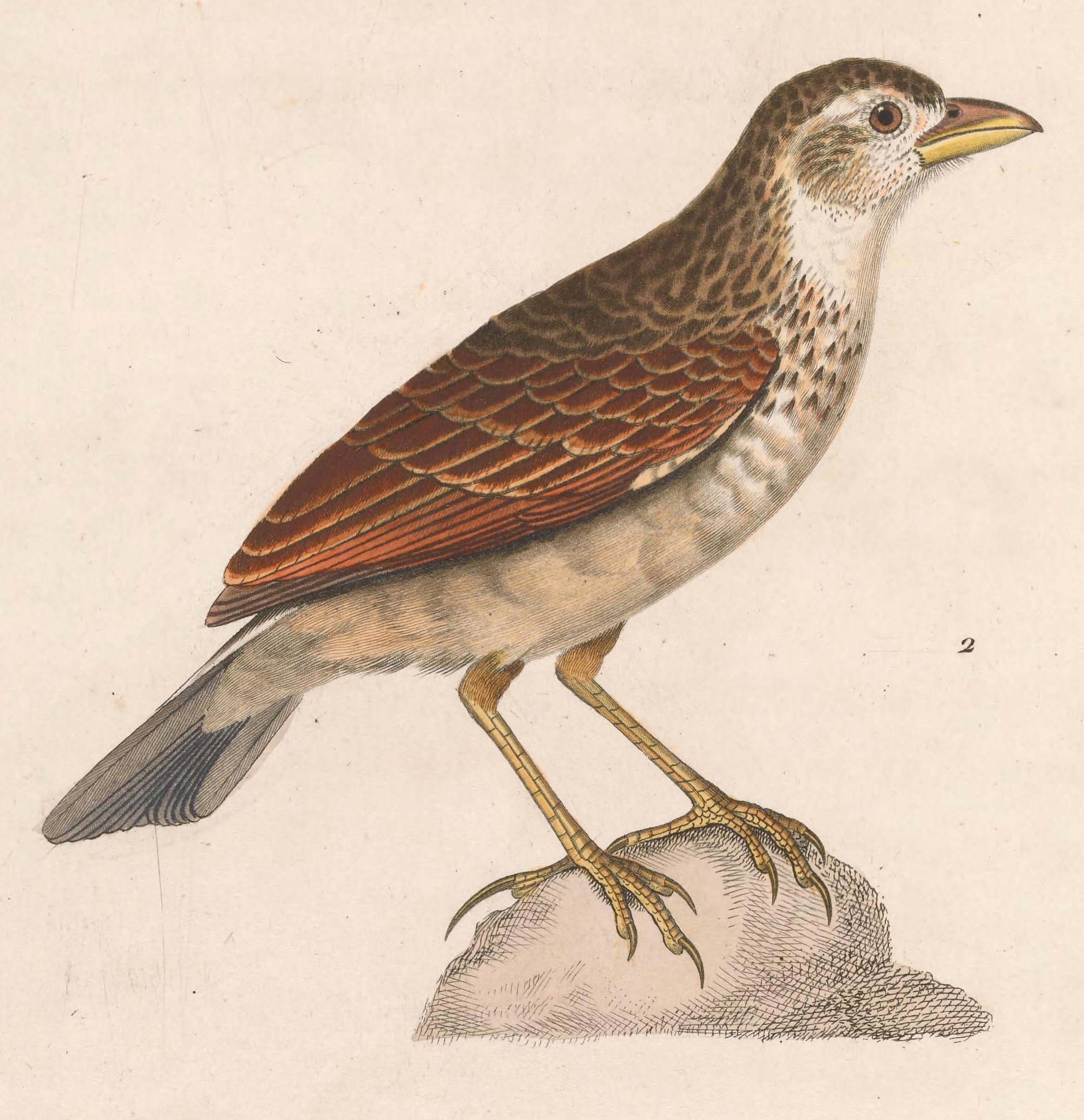
Mirafra javanica javanica 1838 (Illustrated by Nicolas Huet)

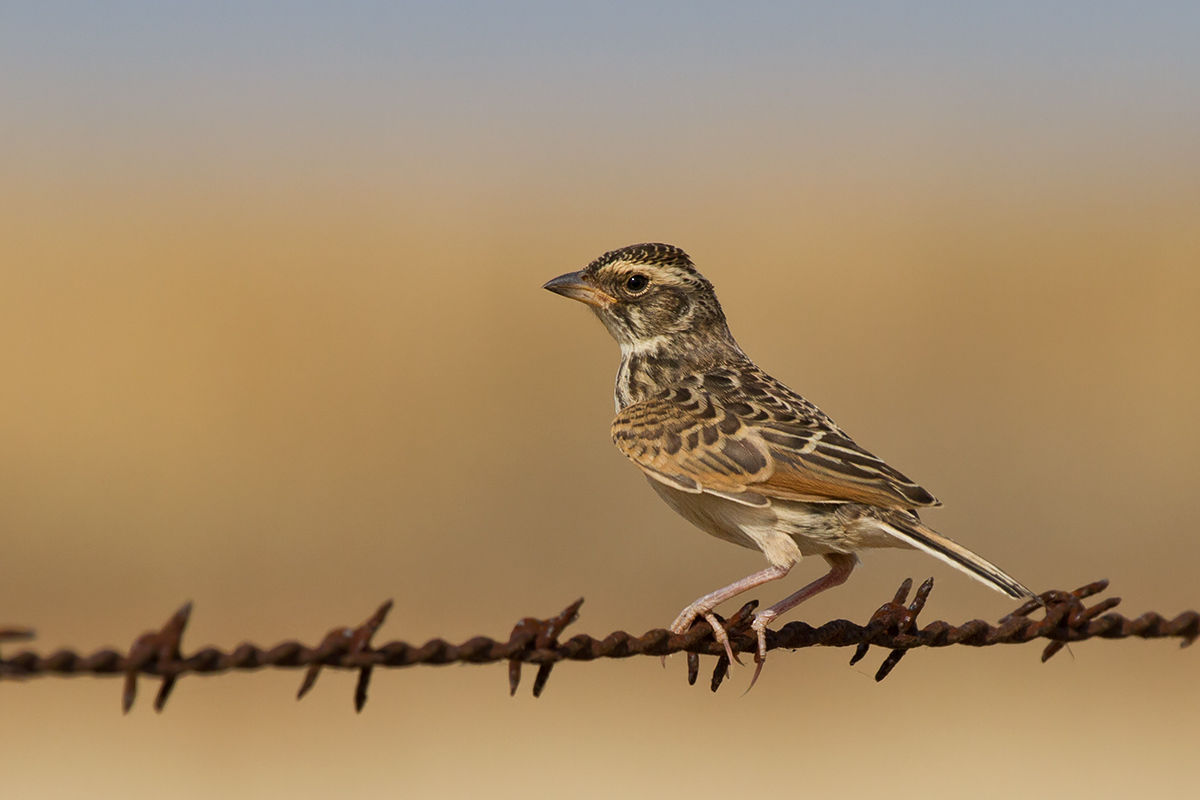
Singing bush lark, Mooloort Plains, Central Vic.

Bryden, south-east Queensland, Australia
