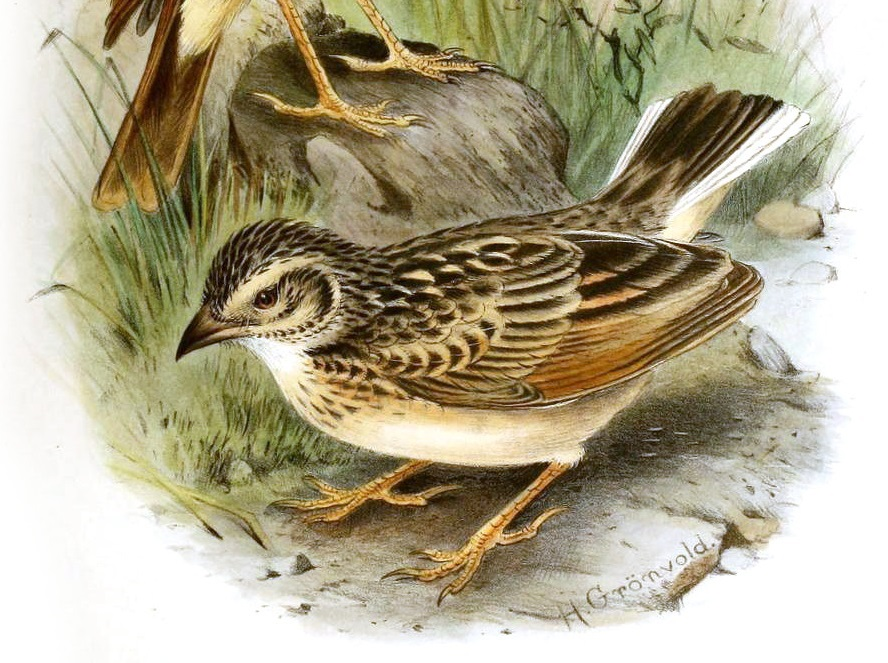

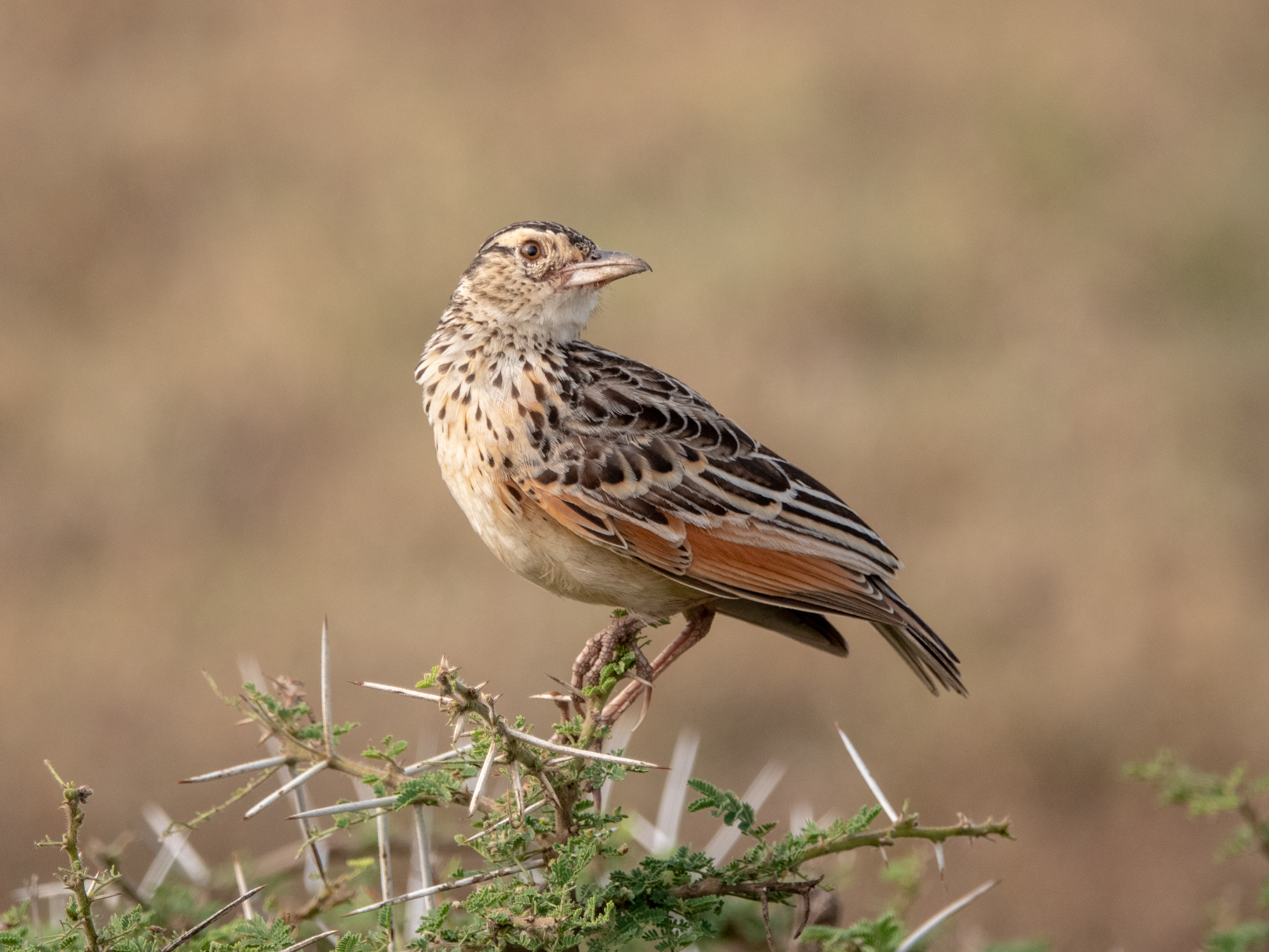

Conservation status
- Least Concern (IUCN 3.1)

Scientific classification
- Kingdom: Animalia
- Phylum: Chordata
- Class: Aves
- Order: Passeriformes
- Family: Alaudidae
- Genus: Mirafra
- Species: M. albicauda

Binomial name
- Mirafra albicauda Reichenow, 1891
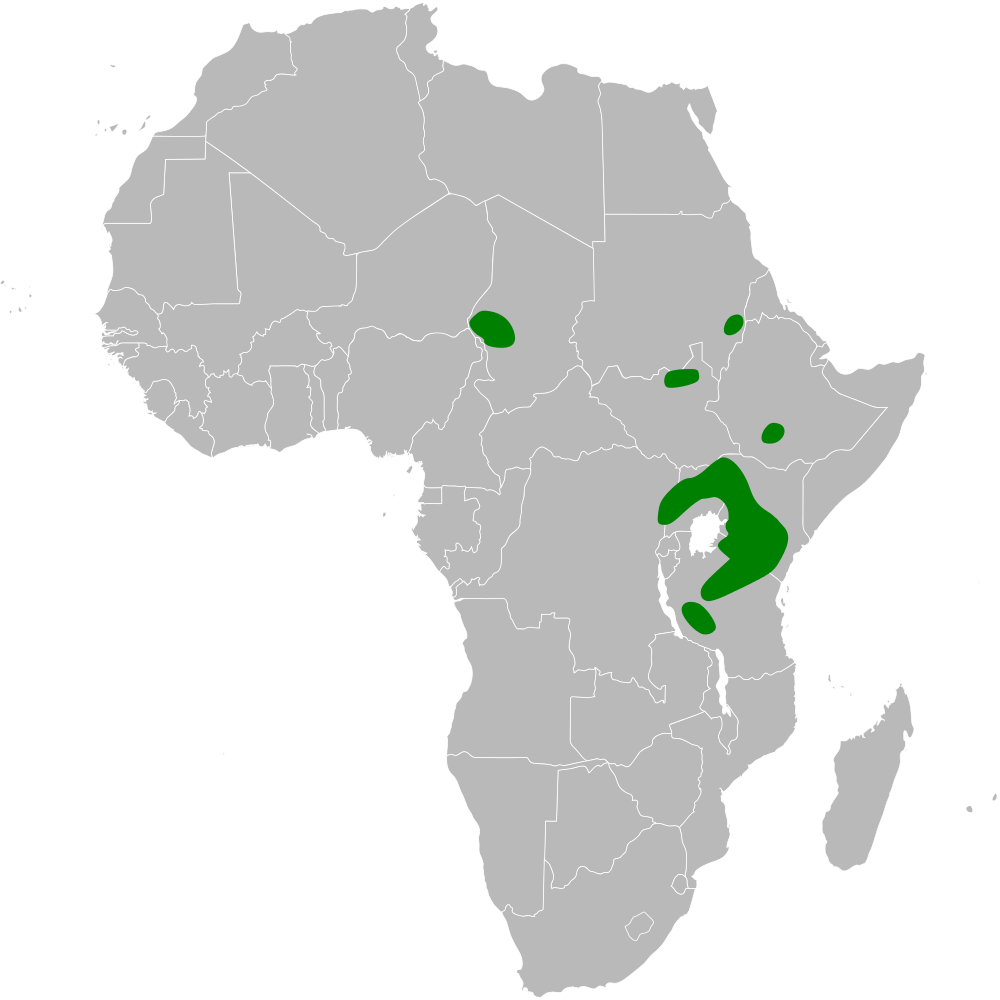
- resident range

= White-tailed lark =

Species of bird

The white-tailed lark (Mirafra albicauda) is a species of lark in the family Alaudidae found in Africa.

== Taxonomy and systematics ==
Alternate names for the white-tailed lark include northern white-tailed bush lark, northern white-tailed lark and white-tailed bush lark.

== Distribution and habitat ==
The white-tailed lark is found in western Chad, eastern Sudan, north-eastern South Sudan, south-central Ethiopia, and from Uganda and western Kenya to central Tanzania. It occurs mainly around Lake Chad and Lake Victoria.

The natural habitat of M. albicauda is tropical to subtropical, seasonally wet or flooded lowland grassland.
