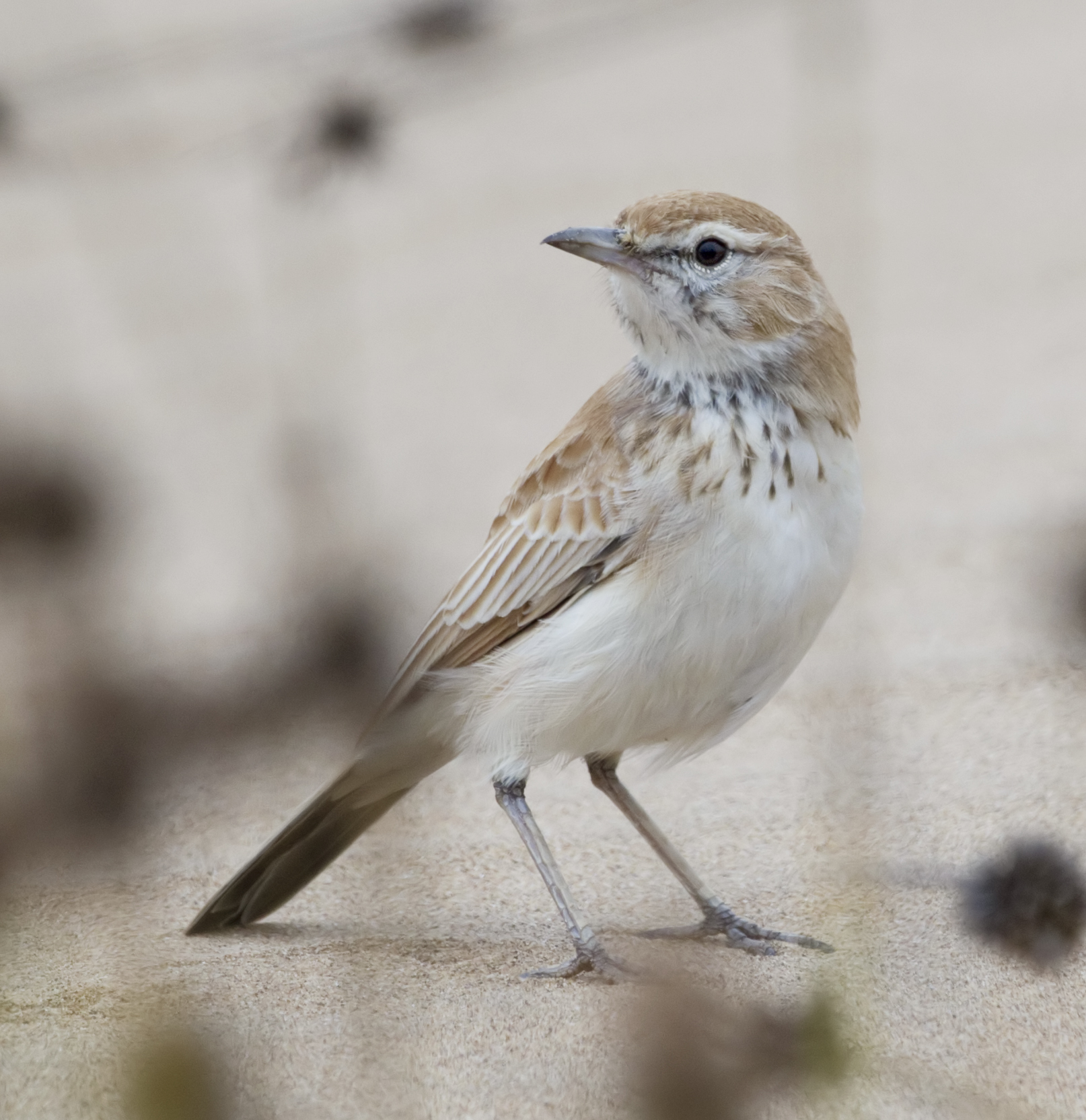
- Near Walvis Bay

Conservation status
- Least Concern (IUCN 3.1)

Scientific classification
- Kingdom: Animalia
- Phylum: Chordata
- Class: Aves
- Order: Passeriformes
- Family: Alaudidae
- Genus: Calendulauda
- Species: C. erythrochlamys

Binomial name
- Calendulauda erythrochlamys (Strickland, 1853)
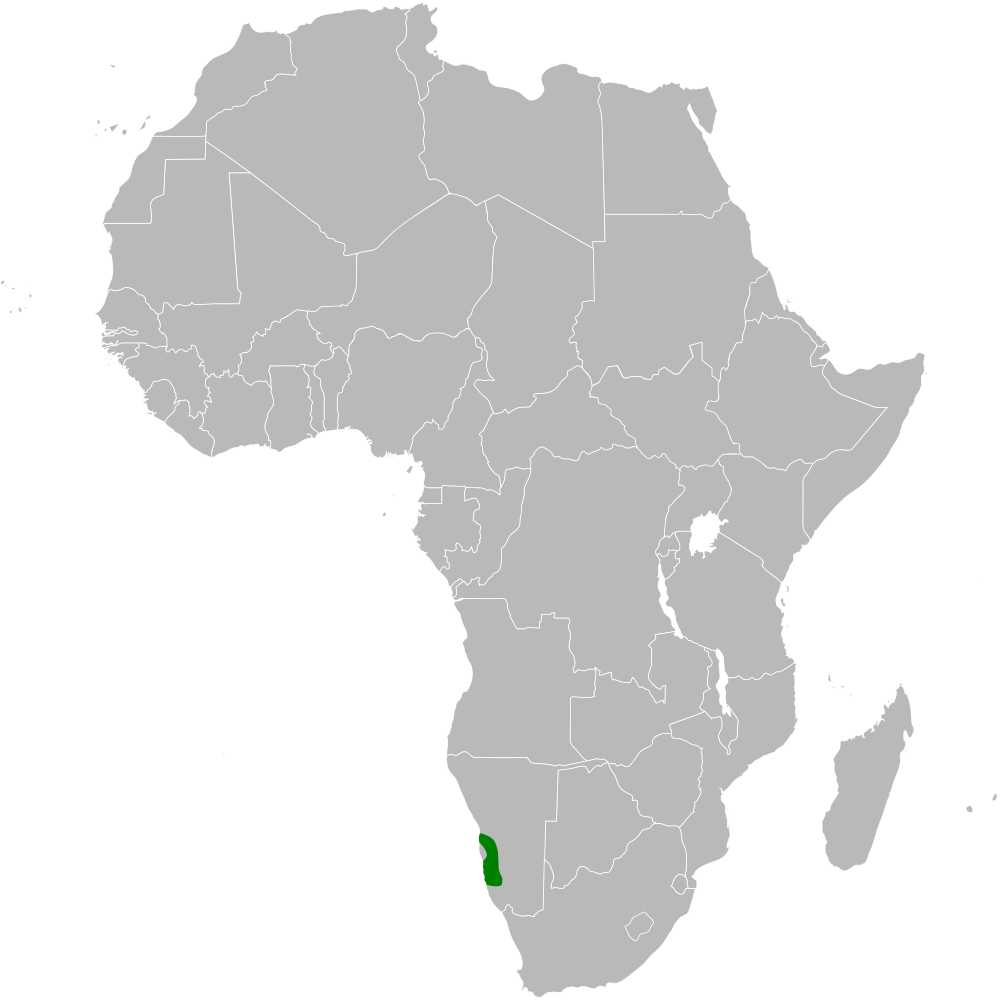
- resident range

Synonyms
- Alauda erythrochlamys; Certhilauda albescens erythrochlamys; Certhilauda erythrochlamys; Mirafra erythrochlamys

= Dune lark =

Species of bird

The dune lark (Calendulauda erythrochlamys) is a species of lark in the family Alaudidae. It is Namibia's only endemic bird.

Its natural habitat is subtropical or tropical dry lowland grassland.

The dune lark is the only avian creature that has evolved the ability to survive in the Namib Desert, which is one of the driest regions in the world.

== Taxonomy ==
The dune lark was formally described in 1853 by the English naturalist Hugh Strickland based on specimens collected in Damaraland, a coastal belt near Walvis Bay in Namibia. He coined the binomial name Alauda erythrochlamys. The dune lark is now one of eight larks placed in the genus Calendulauda that was introduced by the English zoologist Edward Blyth in 1855. The name Calendulauda combines the names of two other lark genera: Calendula and Alauda. The specific epithet erythrochlamys combines Ancient Greek ερυθρος/eruthros meaning "red" with χλαμυς/khlamus, χλαμυδος/khlamudos meaning "cloak".

Four subspecies are recognised:

- C. e. erythrochlamys (Strickland, 1853) – Kuiseb River (Walvis Bay) to Koigab River (central west Namibia)
- C. e. barlowi (Roberts, 1937) – Koigab River to Aus (southwest Namibia)
- C. e. patae (Macdonald, 1953) – coastal southwest Namibia to northwest South Africa
- C. e. cavei (Macdonald, 1953) – inland southwest Namibia to northwest South Africa

Barlow's lark (C. barlowi, including patae and cavei) was formerly considered to be a separate species. It is now lumped with the dune lark based on the very shallow genetic divergence and the essentially identical size and vocalizations.
