= Djibouti xeric shrublands =

Ecoregion in northeastern Africa

Djibouti xeric shrublands Ethiopian xeric grasslands and shrublands
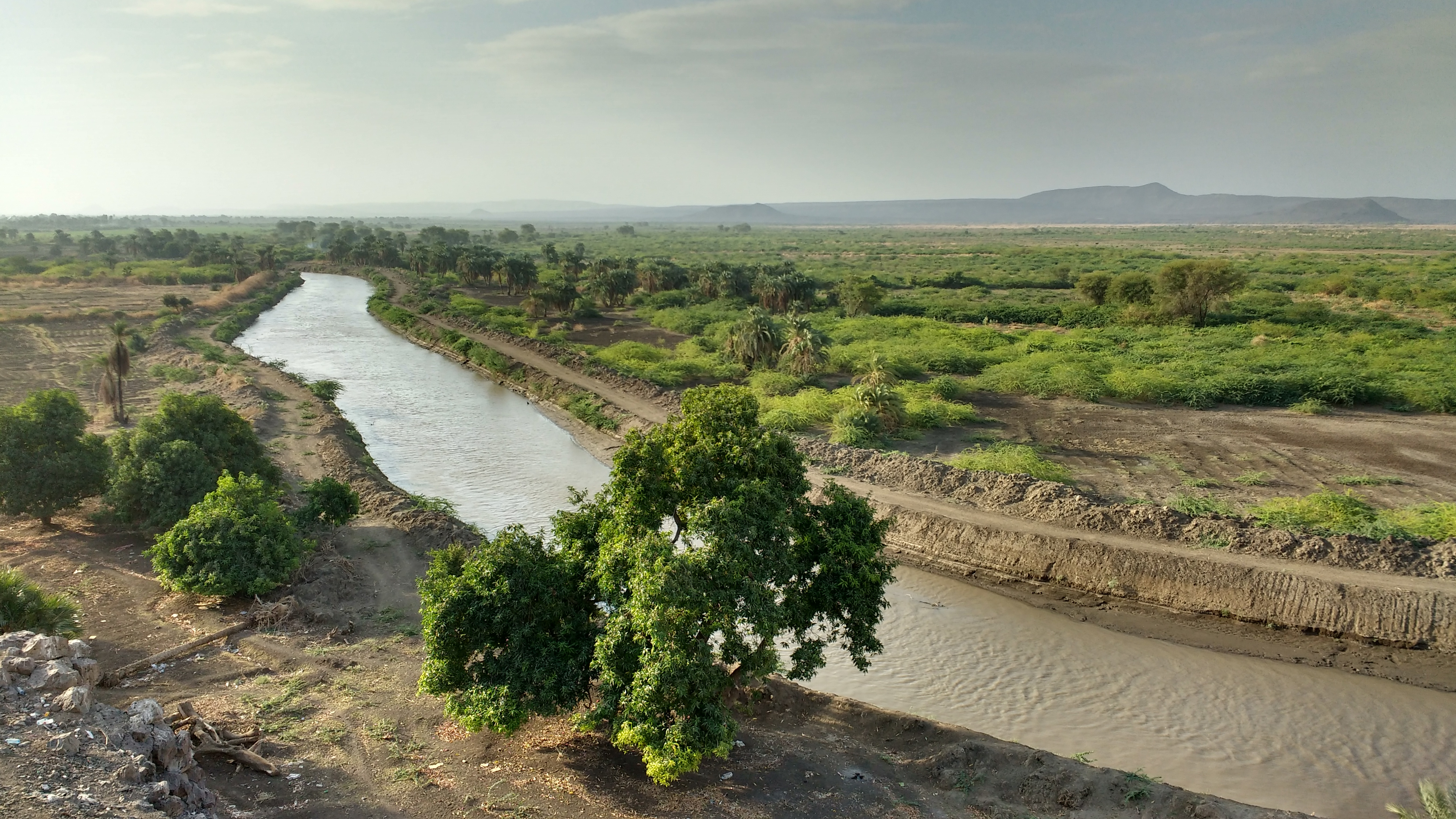
- Awash River, near Asaita, Ethiopia

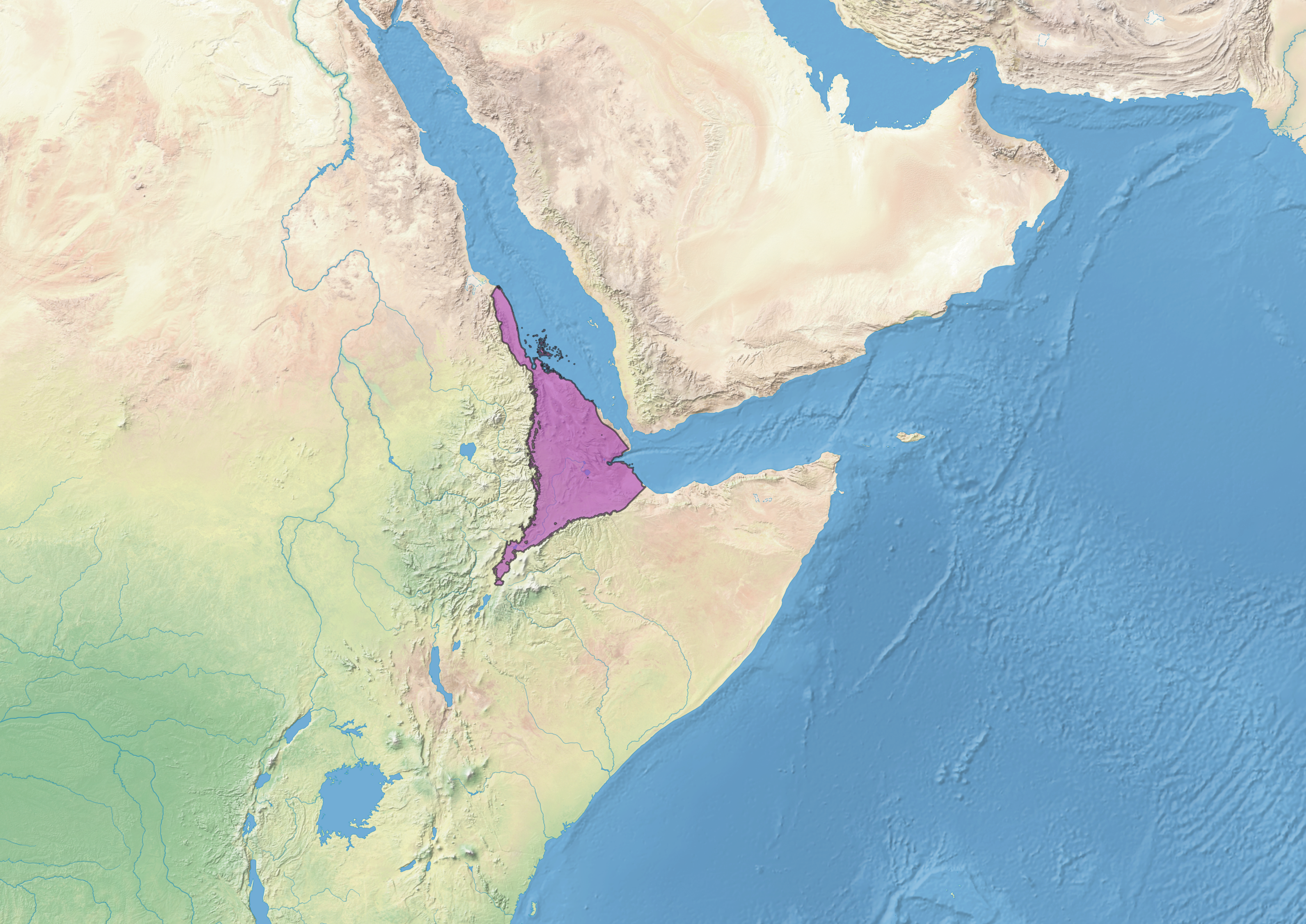
- Map of the Djibouti Xeric Shrublands

Ecology
- Realm: Afrotropical
- Biome: deserts and xeric shrublands
- Borders: List: Eritrean coastal desert; Ethiopian montane grasslands and woodlands; Horn of Africa xeric bushlands; Sahelian Acacia savanna; Somali Acacia–Commiphora bushlands and thickets, Somali montane xeric woodlands

Geography
- Area: 238,180 km^{2} (91,960 mi^{2})
- Countries: Djibouti; Eritrea; Ethiopia; Somalia

Conservation
- Conservation status: Vulnerable
- Protected: 4.68%

The Djibouti xeric shrublands is an ecoregion consisting of a semi-desert strip on or near the Red Sea and the Gulf of Aden coasts in Eritrea, Ethiopia, Djibouti and Somalia. This ecoregion lies mainly between sea level and 800 meters (m) elevation. There are, however, many hills and massifs, which range up to 1300 m as well as outstanding fault-induced depressions, such as the Danakil, lying as low as 155 m below sea level. This region is extremely active tectonically, experiencing many earthquakes and intermittently active volcanoes. Rainfall is very low and yearly averages range from 100 to 200 millimeters (mm), with less rain falling closer to the coast. There are many species of interest, including the endemic Archer's lark (Heteromirafra archeri), a species of dragon tree (Dracaena ombet), and a large suite of desert ungulates, including the last viable population of African wild ass (Equus africanus somalicus).

== Location and description ==
This ecoregion extends inland from the Red Sea and the Gulf of Aden, stretching from the Sudanese-Eritrean border, south through coastal Eritrea to Ethiopia and Djibouti and eastwards into western Somaliland. It covers the Afar Triangle or Afar Depression, a lowland bounded on the south and east by the Ethiopian Highlands, and extends southwest through the Great Rift Valley as far as Lake Awasa. The ecoregion includes Eritrea's Dahlak Archipelago in the Red Sea. While it mainly lies between sea level and 800 m, there are many arid hills and massifs up to 1300 m, including the Danakil Alps along the Eritrea-Ethiopia border. Juniper woodlands in the Goda and Mabla mountains in Djibouti are considered to be outliers of the Ethiopian montane grasslands and woodlands ecoregion, which also covers the Ethiopian Highlands above about 1000 meters elevation. There are also fault-induced depressions, such as the Danakil Depression and Lac Assal, lying as much as 160 m below sea level. Elevation generally increases westward towards the Ethiopian and Eritrean highlands, which form steep escarpments.

The region is extremely active tectonically, and it experiences many earthquakes associated with the continuing enlargement of the Rift Valley. Volcanoes in the ecoregion are also intermittently active. Basement rocks are composed mainly of Tertiary lava flows, although there are also Quaternary basinal deposits at the northern end and pre-Cretaceous basinal deposits on the northern coast of Somalia. Soils developed over the lava deposits are mainly lithosols, while regosols are predominant on the Quaternary and pre-Cretaceous basinal deposits. There are very few permanent watercourses. The most notable is the Awash River of Ethiopia that terminates in a series of lakes near the border with Djibouti.

== Climate ==
The climate is very hot and dry. Mean annual rainfall varies from less than 100 mm close to the coast to around 200 mm further inland. Mean minimum temperatures range from 21° to 24 °C, and mean maximum temperature is around 30 °C. Most of the people have to build their houses with clay in order to maintain a colder interior.

== Flora ==
The predominant vegetation dry shrub steppe and grassland. Vachellia tortilis, Vachellia nubica, and Balanites aegyptiaca grow as scattered trees or shrubs on the sandy plains. Senegalia mellifera and Rhigozum somalense grow as shrubs or small trees on basaltic lava fields. The palm Hyphaene thebaica grows along seasonal watercourses (wadis) and depressions with year-round groundwater. The endangered Bankoualé palm (Livistona carinensis) grows in three wadi systems in the Goda Mountains of Djibouti between 165 and 970 meters elevation. Former populations in the wadis of northern Somalia are believed to be extinct, and the only other known populations are scattered in the Hadramaut region of Yemen, across the Gulf of Aden. The endangered Gabal Elba dragon tree (Dracaena ombet) is found in the ecoregion's mountains above 1000 meters elevation.

Mangroves occur along the coast, in muddy wadi mouths and inlets.

The plant life of the region needs more study, which has been hampered by long-term political strife in the region. Due largely to political instability in the region over the last 30 years, many elements of the fauna and flora remain poorly known. As a suggestion of floral richness, an estimated 825 to 950 species have been observed in Djibouti, although many of these have been found only in the small outlying patches of the Ethiopian montane grasslands and woodlands. These outliers are part of the Day Forest and Mabla Mountains above 1,100 m in Djibouti.

== Fauna ==
Mammals found here include the last Somali wild ass (Equus africanus somalicus) to be found in the wild, on the Buri Peninsula of Eritrea. Other grazing animals include beira, dorcas gazelle, Soemmerring's Gazelle, gerenuk and the beisa oryx (Oryx beisa). The only purely endemic mammal is a gerbil, Gerbillus acticola. There are a number of dry habitat reptiles including the endemic geckos, Arnold's leaf-toed gecko (Hemidactylus arnoldi) and Parker's pigmy gecko (Tropiocolotes somalicus). Birds include the endemic Archer's lark (Heteromirafra archeri).

== People ==
Human population density is typically less than ten persons per square kilometer (km^{2}). In some areas, there is less than one person per km^{2}. The dominant ethnic groups are the nomadic pastoralist Afars and a Somali clan, the Issas. Human density, however, does not account for grazing animals. Urban areas in the region include the ports of Massawa in Eritrea, Djibouti city, and Berbera in Somalia. Smaller towns include the former Afar Region capital of Asaita in Ethiopia and smaller ports along the coast such as Tadjoura in Djibouti and Zeila in Somalia. Tourism in the region includes diving in the Dahlak islands.

== Threats and conservation ==
The conservation status of this ecoregion is not good, with few protected areas and lack of enforcement in existing ones. Habitats however have been degraded, mainly by grazing of livestock as well as cutting of trees for firewood and clearing of land for planting.

== Protected areas ==
4.68% of the ecoregion is in protected areas. Protected areas include Yangudi Rassa National Park and Mille-Serdo Wildlife Reserve in Ethiopia, Nakfa Wildlife Reserve in Eritrea, and the Djalélo and Assamo terrestrial protected areas in Djibouti. Djibouti's Day Forest and Mabla Forest preserves protect small enclaves of montane forest and woodland in the Goda and Mabla mountains. There are two internationally designated Ramsar Sites (wetlands of international importance) in the ecoregion – Suakin–Gulf of Agig in Sudan and Haramous–Loyada in Djibouti.
