= Eritrean coastal desert =

Ecoregion in northeastern Africa

- Near Assab, Eritrea

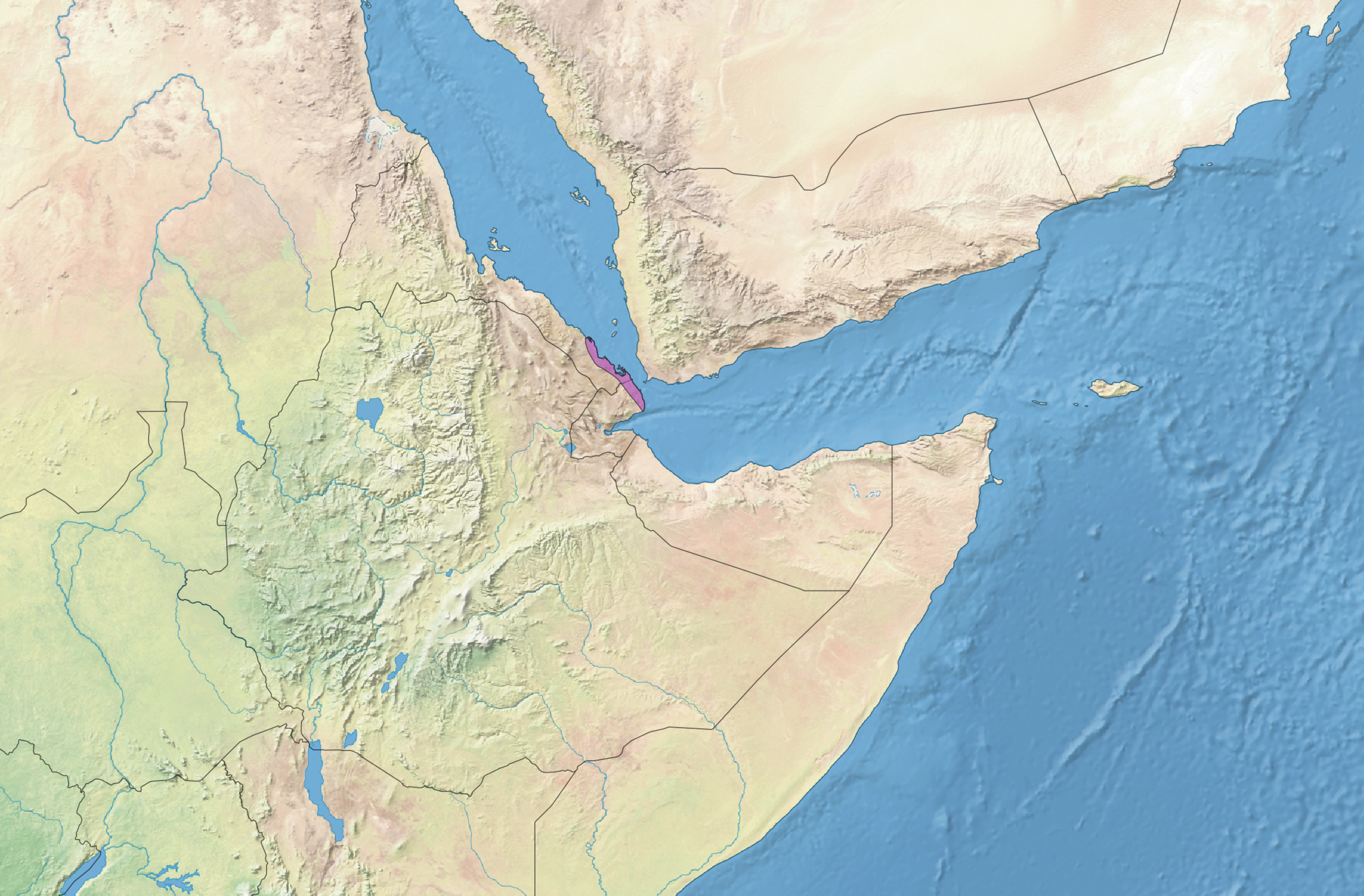
- Map of the Eritrean coastal desert (purple)

Ecology
- Realm: Afrotropical
- Biome: deserts and xeric shrublands
- Borders: Djibouti xeric shrublands

Geography
- Area: 4,400 km^{2} (1,700 sq mi)
- Countries: Djibouti; Eritrea

Conservation
- Conservation status: Relatively stable/intact
- Protected: 0%

The Eritrean coastal desert ecoregion is a harsh sand and gravel strip along the southern part of the coast of Eritrea and the Red Sea coast of Djibouti. This coast is of ecological importance as a channel for the mass migration of birds of prey.

== Location and description ==
The ecoregion consists of a coastal strip in Eritrea's Southern Red Sea Region, which stretches along the Red Sea coast to Obock in Djibouti.

== Flora ==
The flora of the coastal strip consists of herbs and grasses suited to the dry climate such as Aerva javanica, Cymbopogon schoenanthus, Panicum turgidum, and Lasiurus scindicus, along with some Umbrella thorn Acacia tortilis and Acacia asak trees and Rhigozum somalense and Caesalpinia erianthera shrubs.

== Fauna ==
This is one of the busiest raptor migration routes in the world as birds such as buzzards and eagles make their way to Africa for the winter along the Red Sea coast and across the Bab-el-Mandeb strait. Animals found here include sea turtles and gazelles including Dorcas gazelle (Gazella dorcas), Soemmerring’s gazelle (Gazella soemmerringii) and Salt’s dik-dik (Madoqua saltiana). There are three near-endemic reptiles Ogaden burrowing asp (Atractaspis leucomelas), Ragazzi's cylindrical skink (Chalcides ragazzii), and the gecko Hemidactylus flaviviridis.

== Threats and preservation ==
The coast is sparsely populated with the only town of any size the small port of Assab in Eritrea. Grazing of livestock has reduced the natural vegetation, there are no protected areas and there is potential for further change to the area with the completion of the planned coast road from Djibouti to Eritrea. Hunting of the gazelles, turtles and seabirds occurs.

No protected areas have been established.

== See also ==
- Danakil Desert
