= Soapberry (disambiguation) =

Soapberry is a common name for several flowering plants native to the Americas including:

- Sapindus
- Shepherdia canadensis

== See also ==
- Soapbush
- Soapweed (disambiguation)
