= Steudner's gecko =

Conservation status
- Data Deficient (IUCN 3.1)

Scientific classification
- Kingdom: Animalia
- Phylum: Chordata
- Class: Reptilia
- Order: Squamata
- Suborder: Gekkota
- Family: Gekkonidae
- Genus: Tropiocolotes
- Species: T. nubicus

Binomial name
- Tropiocolotes nubicus Baha El Din, 1999
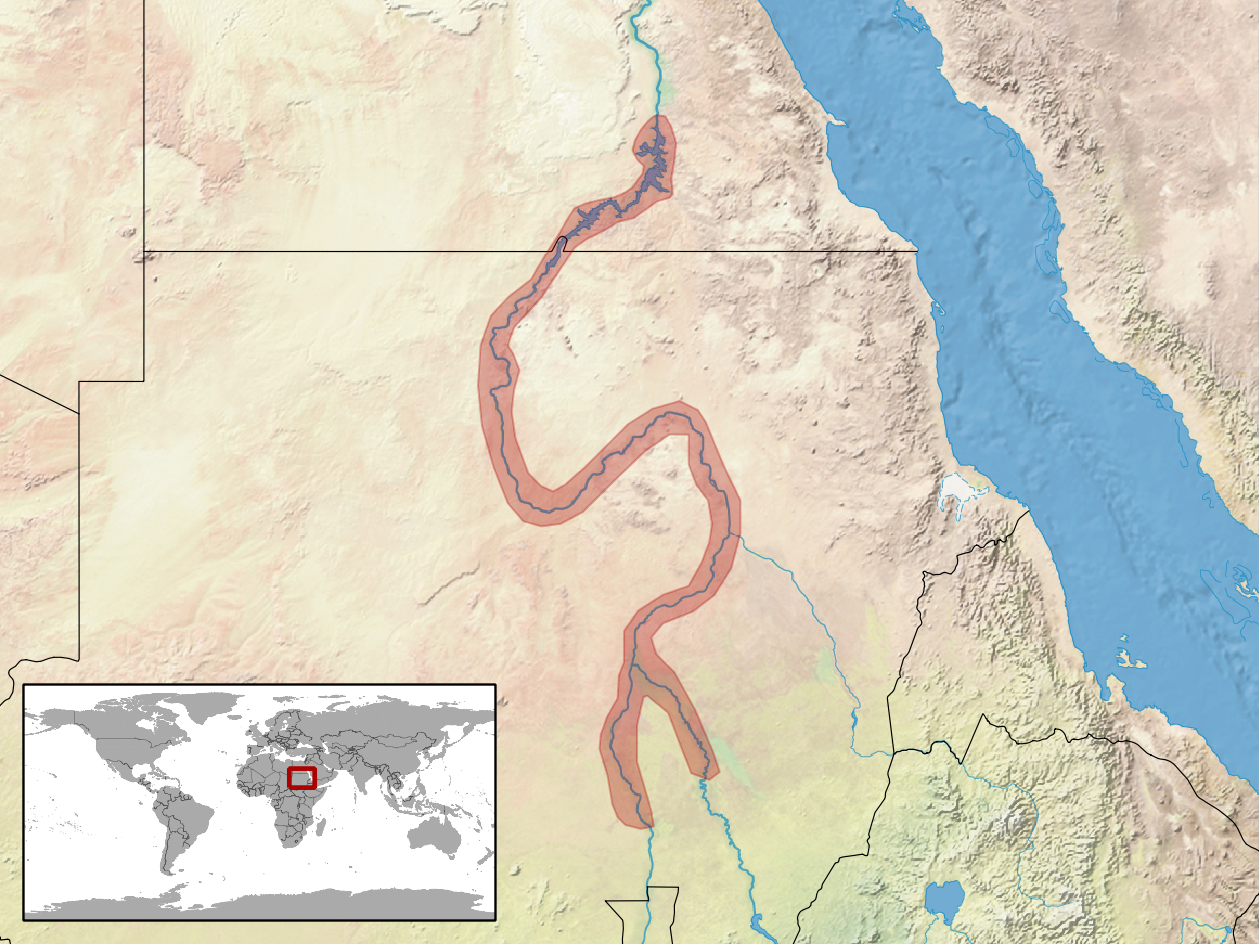
- Distribution of Steudner's gecko.

Species of gecko

The Steudner's gecko (Tropiocolotes nubicus) is a species of gecko of the genus Tropiocolotes. It is found in Egypt and Sudan. The specific epithet nubicus relates to the type locality, the Nubia Region. 'Steudner' may relate to the German botanist and explorer Hermann Steudner (1832-1863).
