= Carex steudneri =

Scientific classification
- Kingdom: Plantae
- Clade: Tracheophytes
- Clade: Angiosperms
- Clade: Monocots
- Clade: Commelinids
- Order: Poales
- Family: Cyperaceae
- Genus: Carex
- Species: C. steudneri

Binomial name
- Carex steudneri Boeckeler

Synonyms
- Carex huttoniana Kük.; Carex wahlenbergiana var. schimperi Boott; Carex zuluensis C.B.Clarke

Species of sedge

Carex steudneri is a tussock-forming species of perennial sedge in the family Cyperaceae. It is native to the eastern part of Africa from Ethiopia in the north to South Africa.

The species was described in 1876 by the botanist Johann Otto Boeckeler as a part of the work Linnaea. The type specimen was collected by Hermann Steudner in Ethiopia.

== See also ==
- List of Carex species
