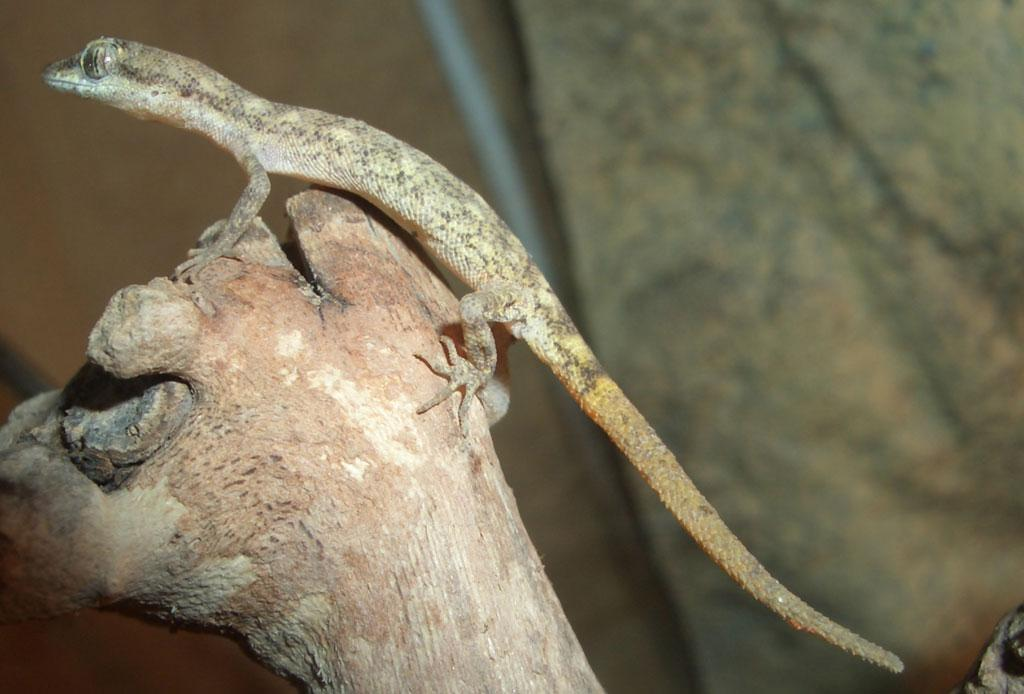
- Steudner's dwarf gecko (Tropiocolotes steudneri)

Scientific classification
- Kingdom: Animalia
- Phylum: Chordata
- Class: Reptilia
- Order: Squamata
- Suborder: Gekkota
- Family: Gekkonidae
- Subfamily: Gekkoninae
- Genus: Tropiocolotes; W. Peters, 1880

= Tropiocolotes =

Genus of lizards

Tropiocolotes is a genus of geckos, lizards in the family Gekkonidae. The genus is native to North Africa and the Middle East. Species in the genus Tropiocolotes grow to a total length (including tail) of about 2 in (5.1 cm). They are commonly known as dwarf geckos, pygmy geckos, or sand geckos. They have an elongated body and the head is oval and of equal or lesser width than the body.

== Species & subspecies ==
The following species and subspecies are recognized as being valid.

- Tropiocolotes algericus Loveridge, 1947 – Algerian sand gecko
- Tropiocolotes bisharicus S. Baha El Din, 2001 – Bishari dwarf gecko
- Tropiocolotes chirioi Ribeiro-Júnior, Koch, Flecks, Calvo & Meiri, 2022
- Tropiocolotes confusus Machado, Smíd, Mazuch, Sindaco, Shukaili & Carranza, 2018
- Tropiocolotes hormozganensis Rounaghi, Rastegar-Pouyani & Hosseinian, 2018
- Tropiocolotes nattereri Steindachner, 1901 – Natterer's gecko
- Tropiocolotes naybandensis V. Krause, Ahmadzadeh, Moazeni, Wagner, Wilms, 2013
- Tropiocolotes nubicus S. Baha El Din, 1999 – Steudner's gecko
- Tropiocolotes scorteccii Cherchi & Spanò, 1963 – Scortecci's sand gecko
- Tropiocolotes somalicus H. Parker, 1942 – Parker's pigmy gecko
- Tropiocolotes steudneri (W. Peters, 1869) – Steudner's dwarf gecko, Algerian sand gecko
- Tropiocolotes tassiliensis Ribeiro-Júnior, Koch, Flecks, Calvo & Meiri 2022
- Tropiocolotes tripolitanus W. Peters, 1880 – northern sand gecko, Tripoli gecko
  - Tropiocolotes tripolitanus apoklomax Pappenfuss, 1969
  - Tropiocolotes tripolitanus occidentalis H. Parker, 1942
  - Tropiocolotes tripolitanus tripolitanus W. Peters, 1880
- Tropiocolotes wolfgangboehmei Wilms, Shobrak & Wagner, 2010
- Tropiocolotes yomtovi Ribeiro-Júnior, Tamar, Maza, Flecks, Wagner, Shacham, Calvo, Geniez, Crochet, Koch & Meiri, 2022

Nota bene: A binomial authority in parentheses indicates that the species was originally described in a genus other than Tropiocolotes.
