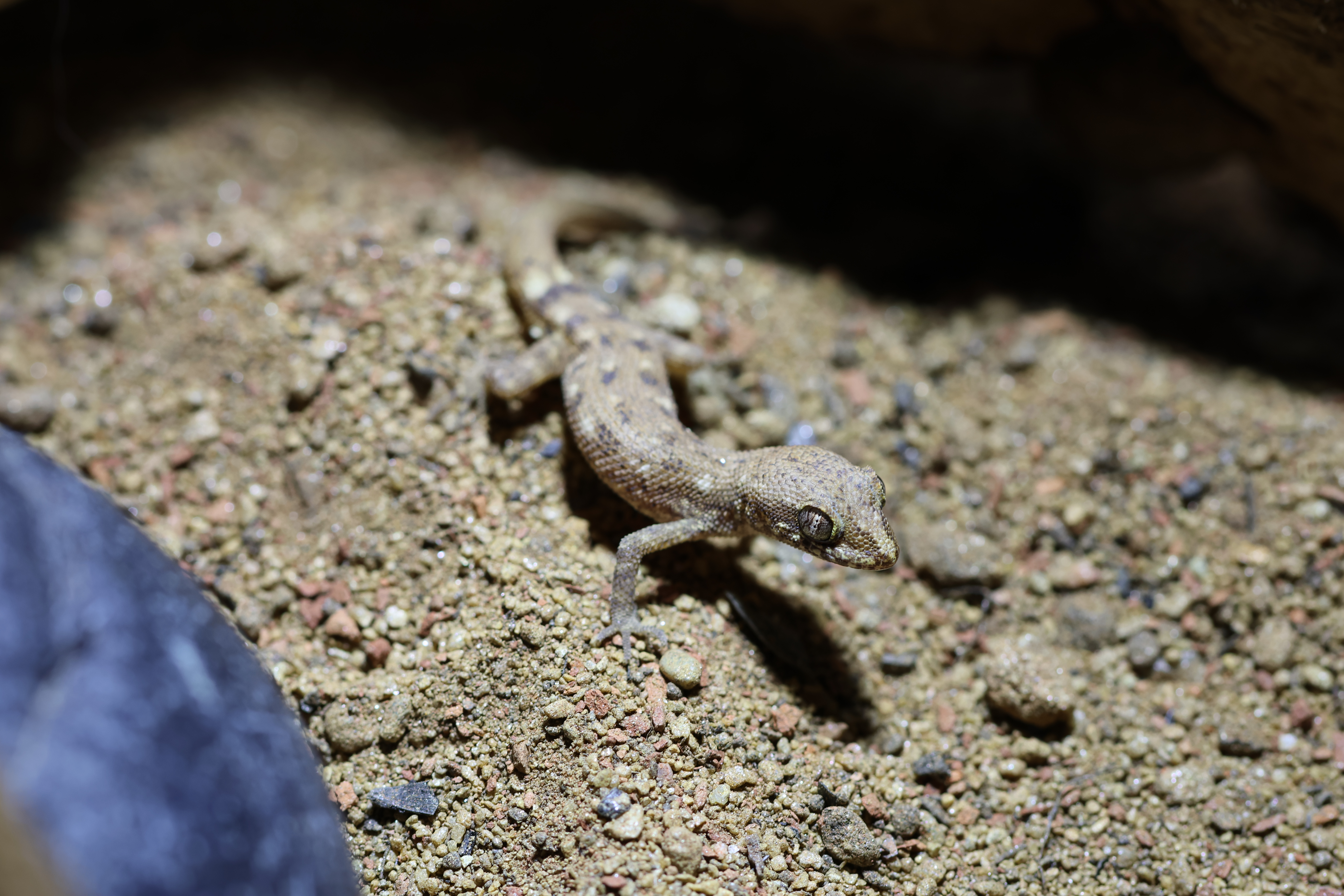

Conservation status
- Least Concern (IUCN 3.1)

Scientific classification
- Kingdom: Animalia
- Phylum: Chordata
- Class: Reptilia
- Order: Squamata
- Suborder: Gekkota
- Family: Gekkonidae
- Genus: Tropiocolotes
- Species: T. algericus

Binomial name
- Tropiocolotes algericus Loveridge, 1947

= Algerian sand gecko =

Species of reptile

The Algerian sand gecko (Tropiocolotes algericus) is a species of gecko of the genus Tropiocolotes. It is found in all the Maghreb countries with the exception of Libya.
