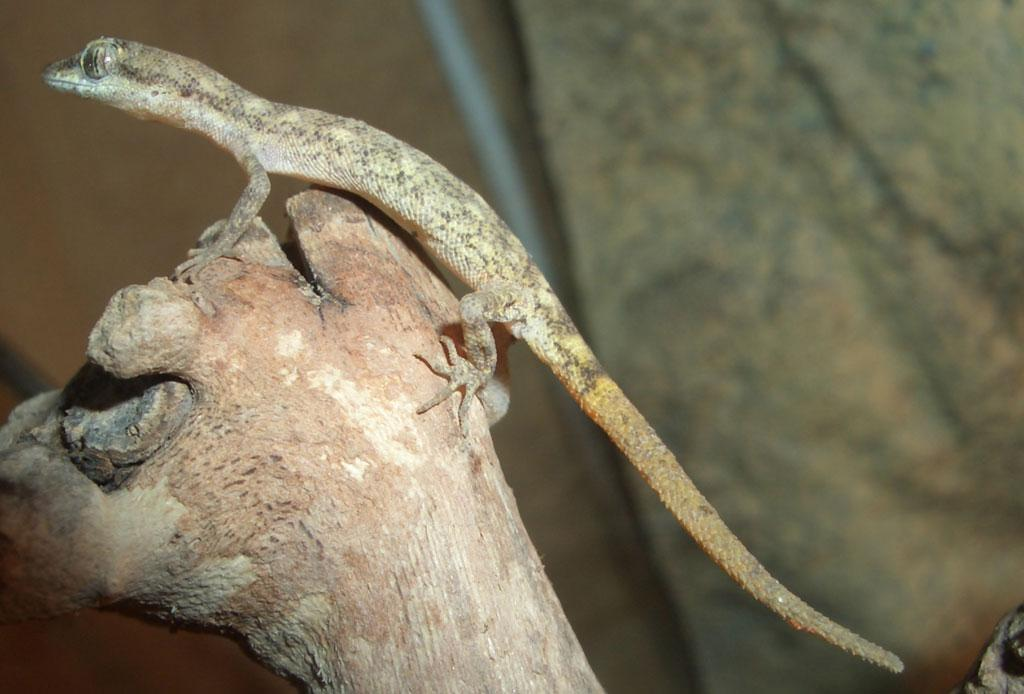
- Tropiocolotes steudneri

Scientific classification
- Kingdom: Animalia
- Phylum: Chordata
- Class: Reptilia
- Order: Squamata
- Suborder: Gekkota
- Family: Gekkonidae
- Genus: Tropiocolotes
- Species: T. steudneri

Binomial name
- Tropiocolotes steudneri (W. Peters, 1869)

Synonyms
- Gymnodactylus steudneri W. Peters, 1869; Stenodactylus petersii Boulenger, 1885; Gymnodactylus steudneri — Boulenger, 1885; Tropiocolotes steudneri — Boulenger, 1891

= Steudner's dwarf gecko =

Species of gecko

Steudner's dwarf gecko (Tropiocolotes steudneri), also commonly known as the Algerian sand gecko and Steudner's pigmy gecko, is a species of lizard in the family Gekkonidae. The species is native to North Africa and the Middle East.

== Etymology ==
The specific name, steudneri, is in honor of Hermann Steudner, who was a naturalist and explorer.

== Geographic range ==
T. steudneri is found in Algeria, Egypt, Ethiopia, Jordan, southeastern Libya, and northern Sudan, and possibly in Iran.

== Reproduction ==
T. steudneri is oviparous.
