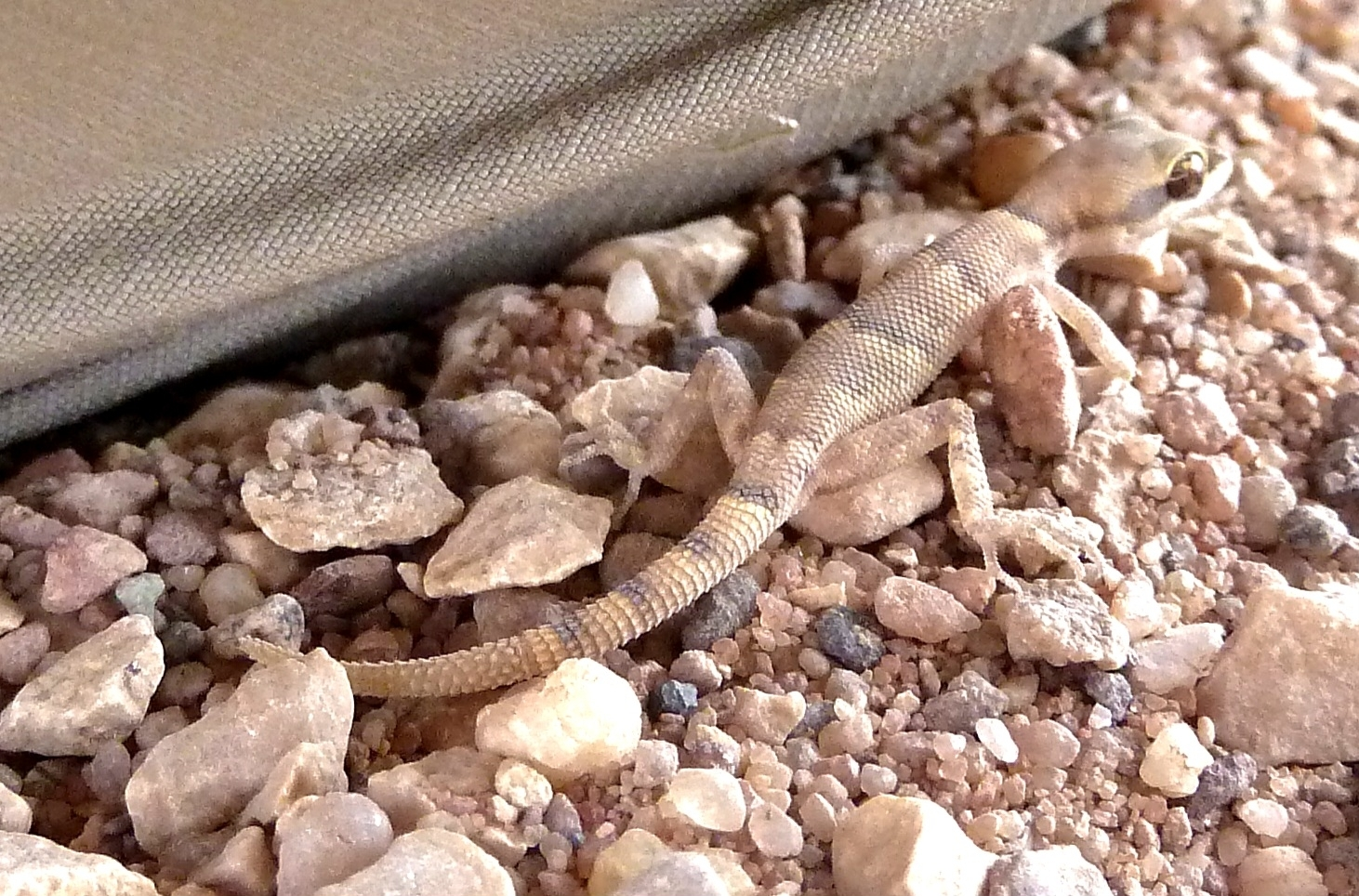
- Sinai Dwarf Gecko in Israel

Conservation status
- Least Concern (IUCN 3.1)

Scientific classification
- Kingdom: Animalia
- Phylum: Chordata
- Class: Reptilia
- Order: Squamata
- Suborder: Gekkota
- Family: Gekkonidae
- Genus: Tropiocolotes
- Species: T. nattereri

Binomial name
- Tropiocolotes nattereri Steindachner, 1901

= Natterer's gecko =

Species of gecko

Natterer's gecko (Tropiocolotes nattereri) is a species of lizard in the family Gekkonidae. The species is native to northeastern Africa and Western Asia.

== Geographic range ==
Tropiocolotes nattereri is found in Egypt, Israel, Jordan, and Saudi Arabia.

== Habitat ==
The preferred natural habitats of Tropiocolotes nattereri are desert, rocky areas, and shrubland, at elevations up to 1,600 m (5,200 ft).

== Etymology ==
The specific epithet, nattereri, is in honor of Austrian ornithologist Johann Natterer.

== Reproduction ==
Tropiocolotes nattereri is oviparous. Clutch size is only one egg, but each female lays two or more clutches per year.
