= Rhigozum madagascariense =

Conservation status
- Least Concern (IUCN 3.1)

Scientific classification
- Kingdom: Plantae
- Clade: Tracheophytes
- Clade: Angiosperms
- Clade: Eudicots
- Clade: Asterids
- Order: Lamiales
- Family: Bignoniaceae
- Genus: Rhigozum
- Species: R. madagascariense

Binomial name
- Rhigozum madagascariense Drake

Species of flowering plant

Rhigozum madagascariense is a perennial shrub that is part of the Bignoniaceae family. The plant is endemic to Madagascar.
