= Rhigozum brevispinosum =

Conservation status
- Least Concern (IUCN 3.1)

Scientific classification
- Kingdom: Plantae
- Clade: Tracheophytes
- Clade: Angiosperms
- Clade: Eudicots
- Clade: Asterids
- Order: Lamiales
- Family: Bignoniaceae
- Genus: Rhigozum
- Species: R. brevispinosum

Binomial name
- Rhigozum brevispinosum Kuntze

Synonyms
- Rhigozum linifolium S.Moore; Rhigozum spinosum Burch. ex Sprague

Species of flowering plant

Rhigozum brevispinosum, the Kalahari yellowthorn, is a perennial shrub that is part of the Bignoniaceae family. The species is native to Angola, Botswana, Namibia, South Africa, Zambia and Zimbabwe. In South Africa, the plant occurs in Gauteng, Limpopo, Mpumalanga, Northern Cape and North West.
