= Tropiocolotes confusus =

Scientific classification
- Kingdom: Animalia
- Phylum: Chordata
- Class: Reptilia
- Order: Squamata
- Suborder: Gekkota
- Family: Gekkonidae
- Genus: Tropiocolotes
- Species: T. confusus

Binomial name
- Tropiocolotes confusus Machado, Smíd, Mazuch, Sindaco, Shukaili, & Carranza, 2018

Species of lizard

Tropiocolotes confusus is a species of gecko endemic to Oman. The type specimen was collected in Dhofar.
