= Tropiocolotes naybandensis =

Scientific classification
- Domain: Eukaryota
- Kingdom: Animalia
- Phylum: Chordata
- Class: Reptilia
- Order: Squamata
- Infraorder: Gekkota
- Family: Gekkonidae
- Genus: Tropiocolotes
- Species: T. naybandensis

Binomial name
- Tropiocolotes naybandensis Krause et al., 2013

Species of gecko

Tropiocolotes naybandensis is a species of gecko of the genus Tropiocolotes. It is found in the Bushehr Province, Iran. The specific epithet naybandensis relates to the type locality, which is near the Nayband Gulf.
