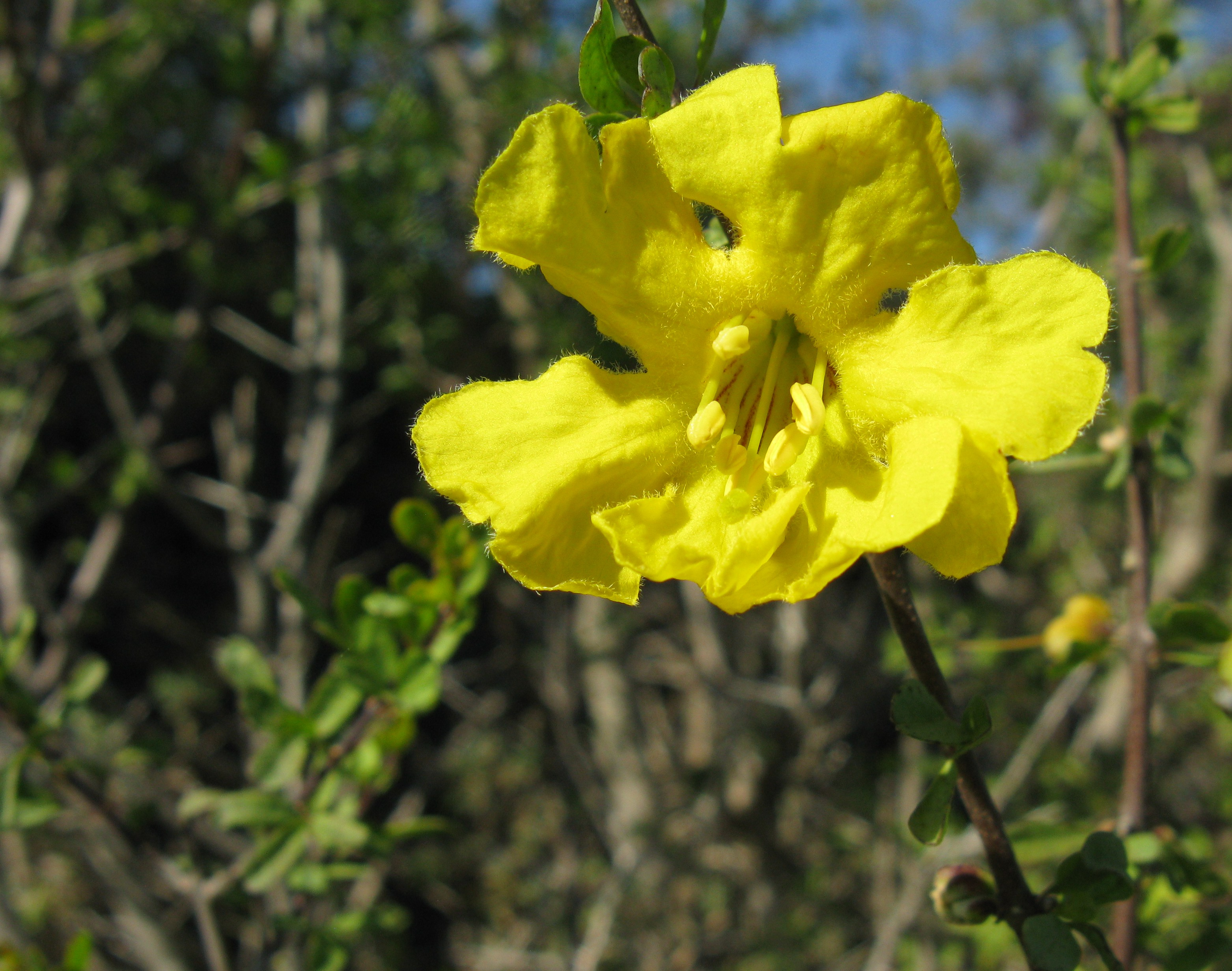

Conservation status
- Least Concern (IUCN 3.1)

Scientific classification
- Kingdom: Plantae
- Clade: Tracheophytes
- Clade: Angiosperms
- Clade: Eudicots
- Clade: Asterids
- Order: Lamiales
- Family: Bignoniaceae
- Genus: Rhigozum
- Species: R. obovatum

Binomial name
- Rhigozum obovatum Burch.

= Rhigozum obovatum =

Species of flowering plant

Rhigozum obovatum, the Karoo gold, is a perennial shrub or tree that is part of the Bignoniaceae family. The species is native to Namibia, South Africa and Zimbabwe. In South Africa, the plant occurs in Limpopo, Mpumalanga, Northern Cape, Eastern Cape, the Free State and the Western Cape.
