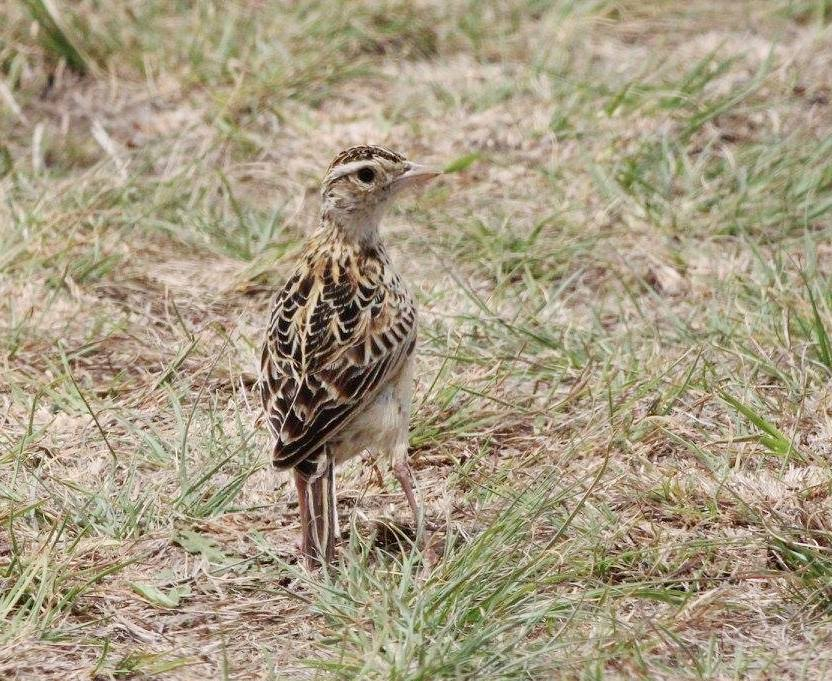
- Rudd's lark in South Africa

Scientific classification
- Kingdom: Animalia
- Phylum: Chordata
- Class: Aves
- Order: Passeriformes
- Family: Alaudidae
- Genus: Heteromirafra; Grant, 1913

Type species
- Heteronyx ruddi C.H.B. Grant, 1908

Species
- 2, See text
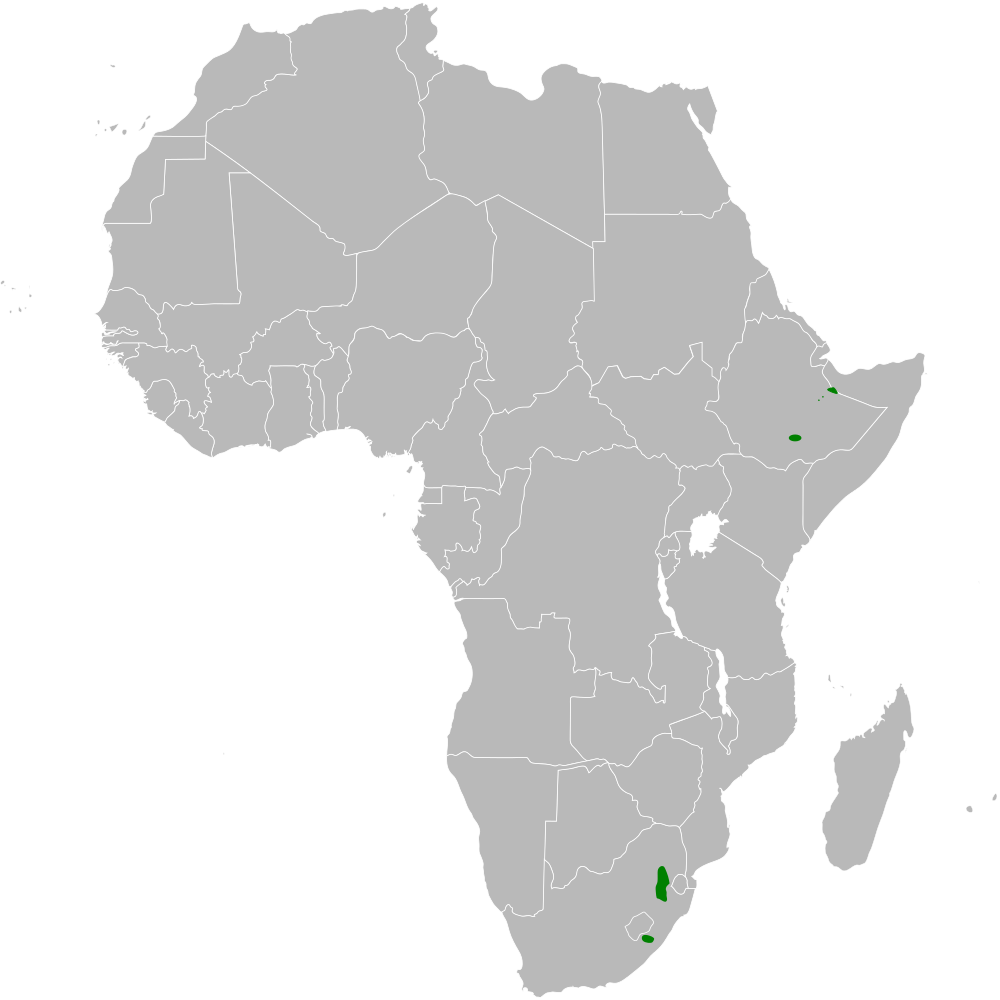
- range of genus

Synonyms
- Heteronyx

= Heteromirafra =

Genus of birds

Heteromirafra is a small genus of African larks in the family Alaudidae.

== Taxonomy and systematics ==
The name "long-clawed lark" has been used to describe both species in this genus.

=== Species ===
The genus contains two extant species:

| Image | Scientific name | Common name | Distribution |
|---|---|---|---|
| | Heteromirafra ruddi (Grant, 1908) | Rudd's lark | South Africa |
| | Heteromirafra archeri Clarke, 1920 | Archer's lark | Somalia and Ethiopia |
