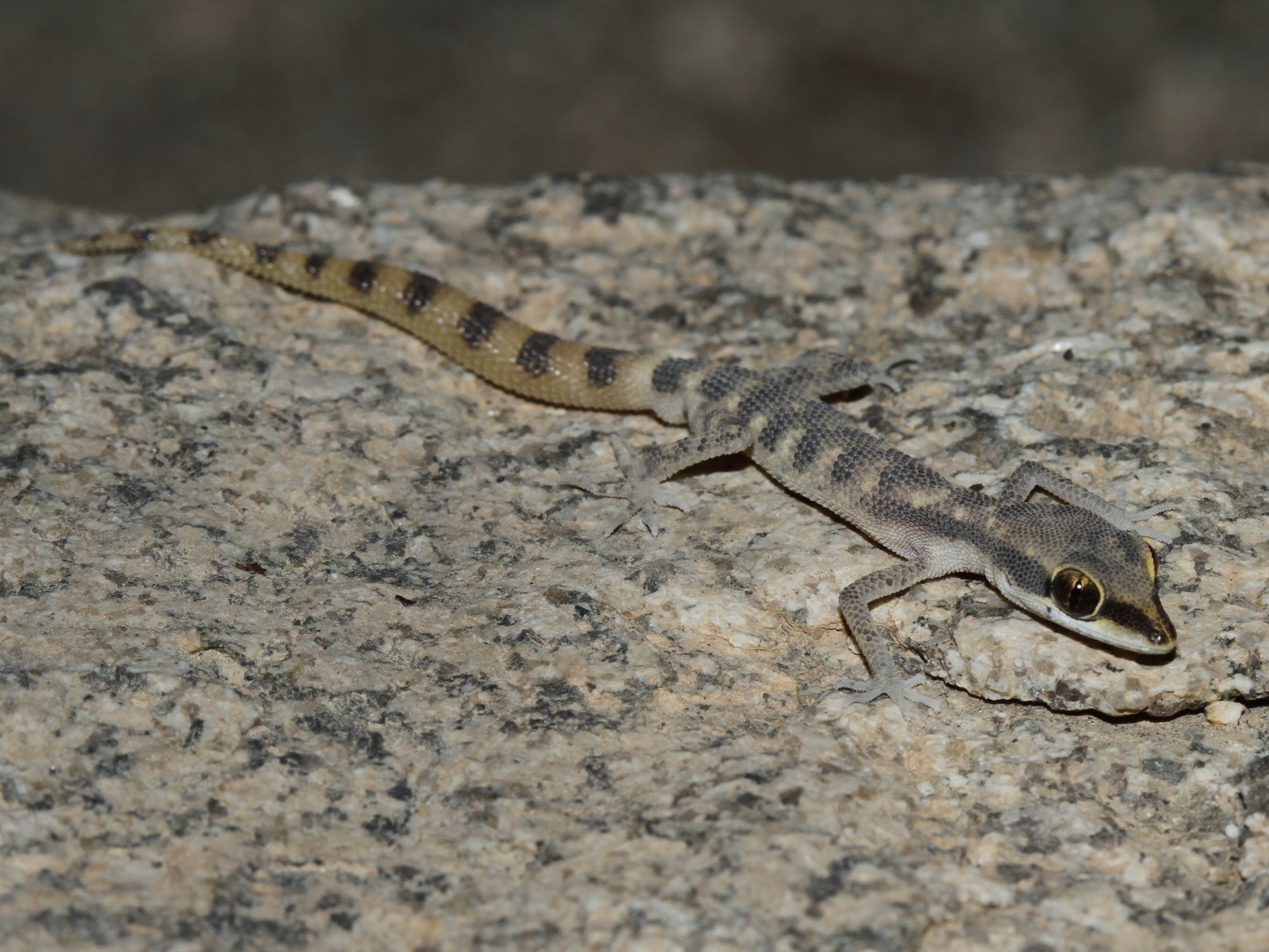
- Bishari dwarf gecko in Egypt, in 2015

Scientific classification
- Domain: Eukaryota
- Kingdom: Animalia
- Phylum: Chordata
- Class: Reptilia
- Order: Squamata
- Infraorder: Gekkota
- Family: Gekkonidae
- Genus: Tropiocolotes
- Species: T. bisharicus

Binomial name
- Tropiocolotes bisharicus Baha El Din, 2001

= Bishari dwarf gecko =

Species of gecko

The Bishari dwarf gecko (Tropiocolotes bisharicus) is a species of gecko of the genus Tropiocolotes. It is found in Egypt. The specific epithet bisharicus refers to the Bisharin tribe, which lives in the same region as this species.
