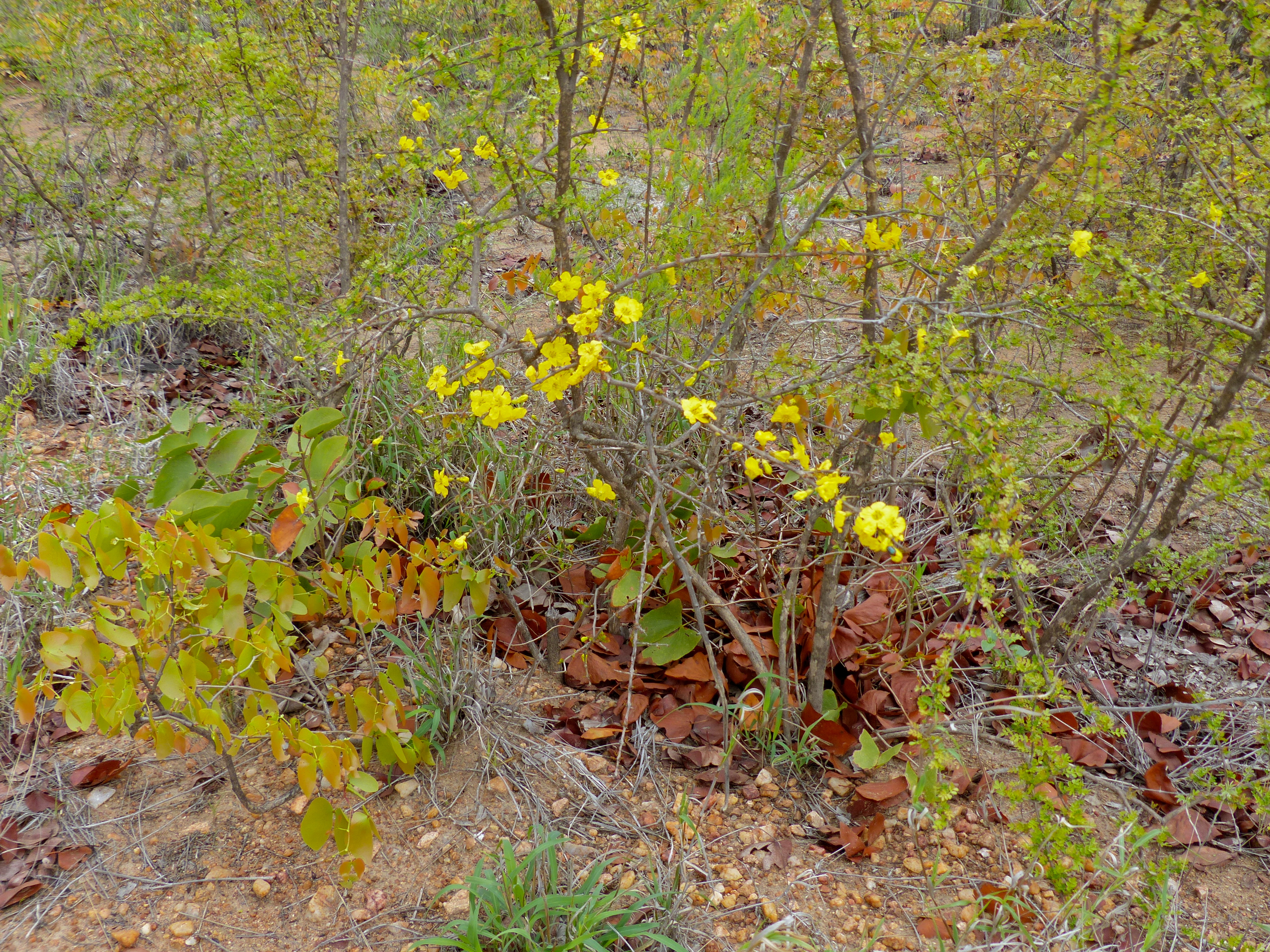

Conservation status
- Least Concern (IUCN 3.1)

Scientific classification
- Kingdom: Plantae
- Clade: Tracheophytes
- Clade: Angiosperms
- Clade: Eudicots
- Clade: Asterids
- Order: Lamiales
- Family: Bignoniaceae
- Genus: Rhigozum
- Species: R. zambesiacum

Binomial name
- Rhigozum zambesiacum Baker

= Rhigozum zambesiacum =

Species of flowering plant

Rhigozum zambesiacum, the Mopane yellowthorn or Zambezi yellowthorn, is a shrub or tree that is part of the Bignoniaceae family. The species is native to Botswana, Eswatini, Mozambique, South Africa and Zimbabwe. In South Africa, the plant occurs in KwaZulu-Natal, Limpopo and Mpumalanga, more specifically from the north of KwaZulu-Natal, along the Lebombo Mountains to the Limpopo River Valley. The tree also occurs in the Zambezi River Valley. This tree grows in low-lying bushveld and on rocky places.
