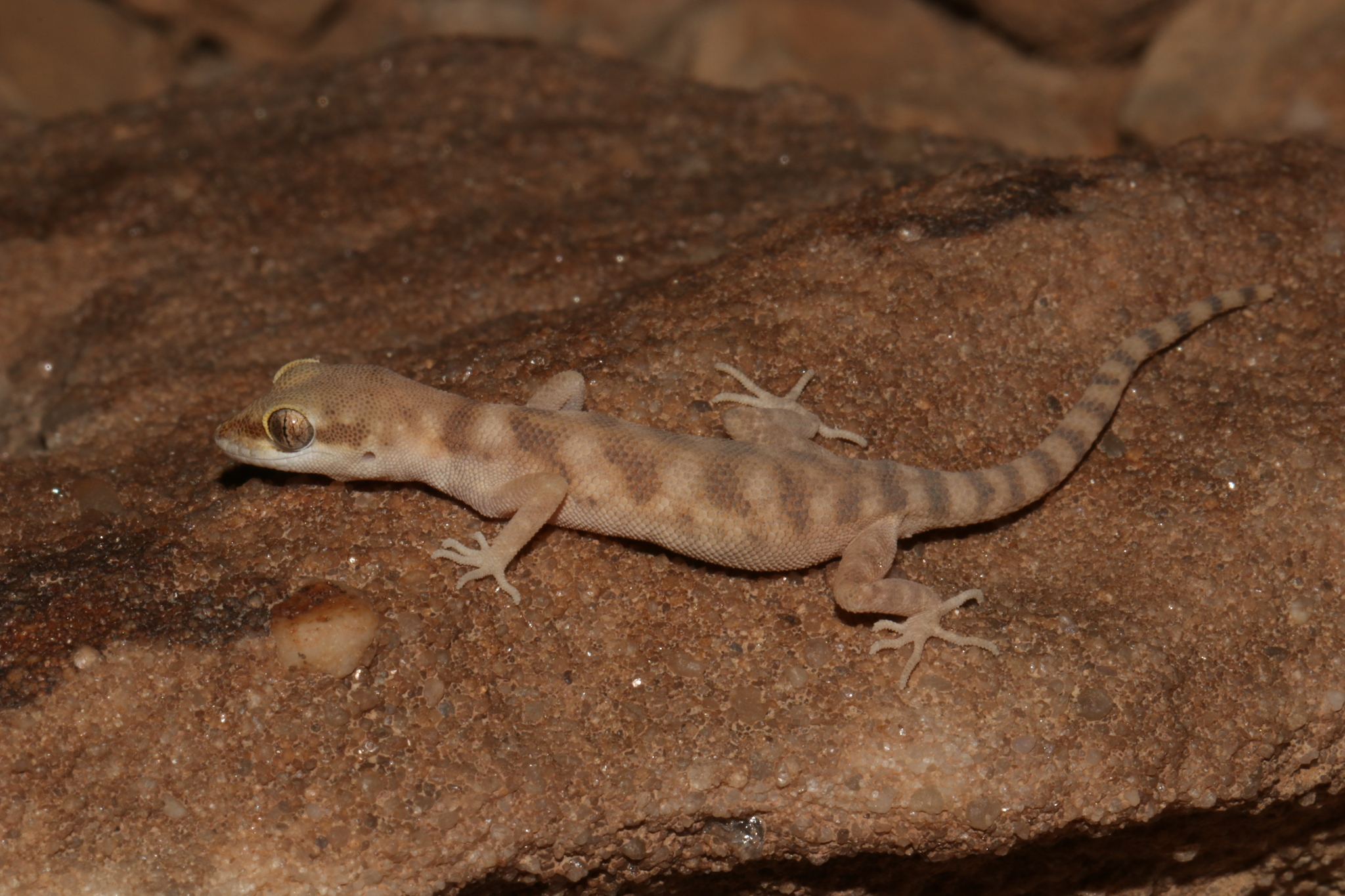

Conservation status
- Data Deficient (IUCN 3.1)

Scientific classification
- Kingdom: Animalia
- Phylum: Chordata
- Class: Reptilia
- Order: Squamata
- Suborder: Gekkota
- Family: Gekkonidae
- Genus: Tropiocolotes
- Species: T. wolfgangboehmei

Binomial name
- Tropiocolotes wolfgangboehmei Wilms, Shobrak & Wagner, 2010

= Tropiocolotes wolfgangboehmei =

Species of gecko

Tropiocolotes wolfgangboehmei is a species of gecko of the family Gekkonidae from central Saudi Arabia. The specific epithet wolfgangboehmei honors Wolfgang Böhme for his contributions in herpetology and for being the mentor of two of the authors who described T. wolfgangboehmei.

The species is only known by two specimens from Ath Thumamah, Saudi Arabia, the holotype (ZFMK 43668) and the paratype (ZFMK 87120).

== Description ==
T. wolfgangboehmei is a small gecko with a maximum snout-vent length (SVL) of 29.4 mm (1.16 in). It possesses all the diagnostic features of Tropiocolotes such as digits (the most distal parts of a limb) slightly angularly bent without ornamentation covered below by a single series of transverse lamellae (thin plate-like structures very close to one another with open space between), a vertical pupil and uniform dorsal scales, among others. It also has two pairs of postmental shields and four scales in contact with the nostril.

It differs from other species by its smooth dorsal escalation, by the possession of clearly bi- or tricarinated subdigital scales and by the size of the two pairs of postmental shields (the second is much smaller than first).
