= Rhigozum virgatum =

Scientific classification
- Kingdom: Plantae
- Clade: Tracheophytes
- Clade: Angiosperms
- Clade: Eudicots
- Clade: Asterids
- Order: Lamiales
- Family: Bignoniaceae
- Genus: Rhigozum
- Species: R. virgatum

Binomial name
- Rhigozum virgatum Merxm. & A.Schreib.

Species of flowering plant

Rhigozum virgatum, the Kaoko yellowthorn, is a perennial shrub that is part of the Bignoniaceae family. The plant is native to Angola and Namibia.
