= Scortecci's sand gecko =

Conservation status
- Least Concern (IUCN 3.1)

Scientific classification
- Kingdom: Animalia
- Phylum: Chordata
- Class: Reptilia
- Order: Squamata
- Suborder: Gekkota
- Family: Gekkonidae
- Genus: Tropiocolotes
- Species: T. scorteccii

Binomial name
- Tropiocolotes scorteccii Cherchi & Spanò, 1963

Synonyms
- Tropiocolotes scortecci [sic] (ex errore)

Species of gecko

Scortecci's sand gecko (Tropiocolotes scorteccii), also known commonly as Scortecci's dwarf gecko, is a species of lizard in the family Gekkonidae. The species is endemic to the Arabian Peninsula.

== Etymology ==
The specific epithet, scorteccii, honors Giuseppe Scortecci, an Italian herpetologist.

== Geographic range ==
T. scorteccii is found in Oman and Yemen.

== Habitat ==
The preferred natural habitat of T. scorteccii is desert, at altitudes from sea level to 1,300 m (4,300 ft).

== Description ==
T. scorteccii may attain a snout-to-vent length (SVL) of 21.5 mm (0.85 in), and the tail may be almost as long as the SVL.

== Reproduction ==
T. scorteccii is oviparous.
