= Mille-Serdo Wildlife Reserve =

Protected area in Afar Region, Ethiopia

- ማይል ሰርዶ የዱር አራዊት ጥበቃ
- IUCN category IV (habitat/species management area)
- Interactive map of Mille-Serdo Wildlife Reserve
- Location: Afar Region, Ethiopia
- Coordinates: 11°49′N 40°54′E
- Area: 6,503.0 km^{2} (2,510.8 sq mi)
- Designation: Wildlife reserve
- Designated: 1973
- Governing body: Office of Culture Sport and Tourism (OCST)

Mille-Serdo Wildlife Reserve (Amharic: ማይል ሰርዶ የዱር አራዊት ጥበቃ) is a protected area in Ethiopia. It is located in Afar Region of Ethiopia. The reserve protects a portion of the Awash River and the surrounding desert.

== Geography ==
Mille-Serdo Wildlife Reserve covers an area of 6503 km^{2}. It is located in the Afar Depression, a desert region lying between the Red Sea and the Ethiopian Highlands. It is part of the Ethiopian xeric grasslands and shrublands ecoregion.

The reserve includes the lower reach of the Awash River, which originates in the Ethiopian Highlands and flows through the African Rift Valley to empty into saline lakes, including Lake Abbe, which lie immediately southeast of the reserve along the Ethiopia-Djibouti border.

Two other protected areas, Yangudi Rassa National Park and Awash West Controlled Hunting Area, adjoin Mille-Serdo reserve on the southwest.

== Fauna ==
The reserve was created to protect the critically endangered Somali wild ass (Equus africanus somaliensis). The species used to range more widely across the Horn of Africa. The wild population has declined precipitously since the early 1970s, and the remaining population, estimated at 70 to 600 individuals, is limited to a portion of the Afar Depression in Ethiopia and Eritrea.

== Conservation ==
The reserve was designated in 1973, and is also known as the Mille-Serdo Wild Ass Reserve. The local people are Afar pastoralists.
