= Tropiocolotes yomtovi =

Scientific classification
- Kingdom: Animalia
- Phylum: Chordata
- Class: Reptilia
- Order: Squamata
- Suborder: Gekkota
- Family: Gekkonidae
- Genus: Tropiocolotes
- Species: T. yomtovi

Binomial name
- Tropiocolotes yomtovi Ribeiro-Júnior, Tamar, Maza, Flecks, Wagner, Shacham, Calvo, Geniez, Crochet, Koch, & Meiri (2022)

Species of gecko

Tropiocolotes yomtovi is a species of gecko of the genus Tropiocolotes. It is found in Israel, Egypt, Jordan, and Saudi Arabia.
