= Tropiocolotes chirioi =

Scientific classification
- Kingdom: Animalia
- Phylum: Chordata
- Class: Reptilia
- Order: Squamata
- Suborder: Gekkota
- Family: Gekkonidae
- Genus: Tropiocolotes
- Species: T. chirioi

Binomial name
- Tropiocolotes chirioi Ribeiro-Júnior, Koch, Flecks, Calvo, & Meiri, 2022

Species of gecko

Tropiocolotes chirioi is a species of gecko of the family Gekkonidae. It is found in the Sahara Desert.
