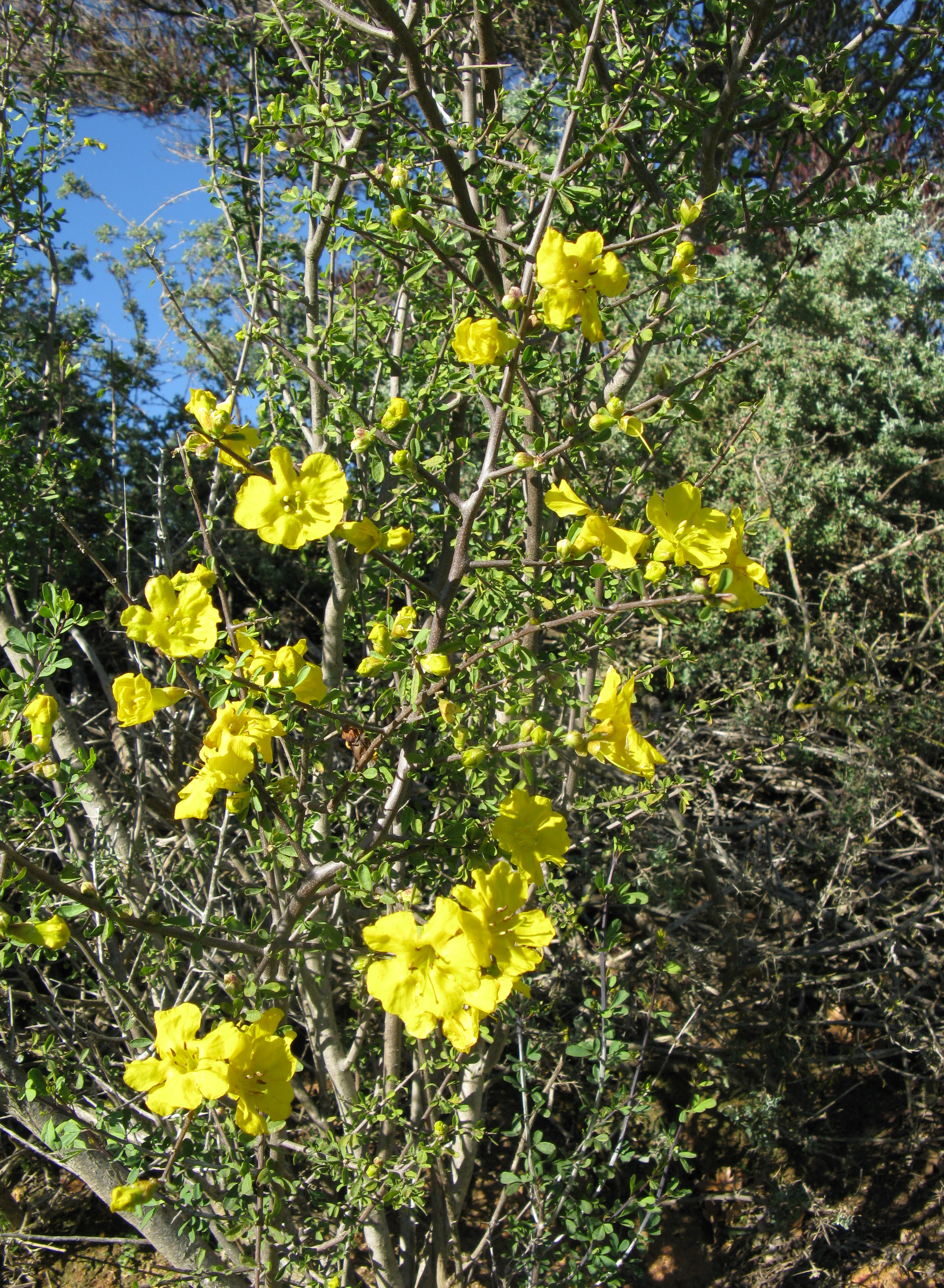
- Rhigozum obovatum

Scientific classification
- Kingdom: Plantae
- Clade: Tracheophytes
- Clade: Angiosperms
- Clade: Eudicots
- Clade: Asterids
- Order: Lamiales
- Family: Bignoniaceae
- Clade: Crescentiina
- Clade: Paleotropical clade
- Genus: Rhigozum; Burch.

Species
- See text

= Rhigozum =

Genus of flowering plants

Rhigozum is a genus of flowering plants in the family Bignoniaceae.

Rhigozum is a flowering shrub or small tree which is native to the drier areas of Africa. It can grow to 3 metres in height. This genus is characterised by branches which are short, rigid and twisting in angular directions. This genus produces flowers between the months of September and December. It is native to the dry, open woodlands and rocky outcrops of Angola, Botswana, Namibia, South Africa, Zambia, and Zimbabwe.

== Species ==
- Rhigozum brevispinosum Kuntze
- Rhigozum madagascariense Drake
- Rhigozum obovatum Burch.
- Rhigozum somalense Hallier f.
- Rhigozum trichotomum Burch.
- Rhigozum virgatum Merxm. & A.Schreib.
- Rhigozum zambesiacum Baker
