= Tropiocolotes tripolitanus =

Conservation status
- Least Concern (IUCN 3.1)

Scientific classification
- Kingdom: Animalia
- Phylum: Chordata
- Class: Reptilia
- Order: Squamata
- Suborder: Gekkota
- Family: Gekkonidae
- Genus: Tropiocolotes
- Species: T. tripolitanus

Binomial name
- Tropiocolotes tripolitanus Peters, 1880
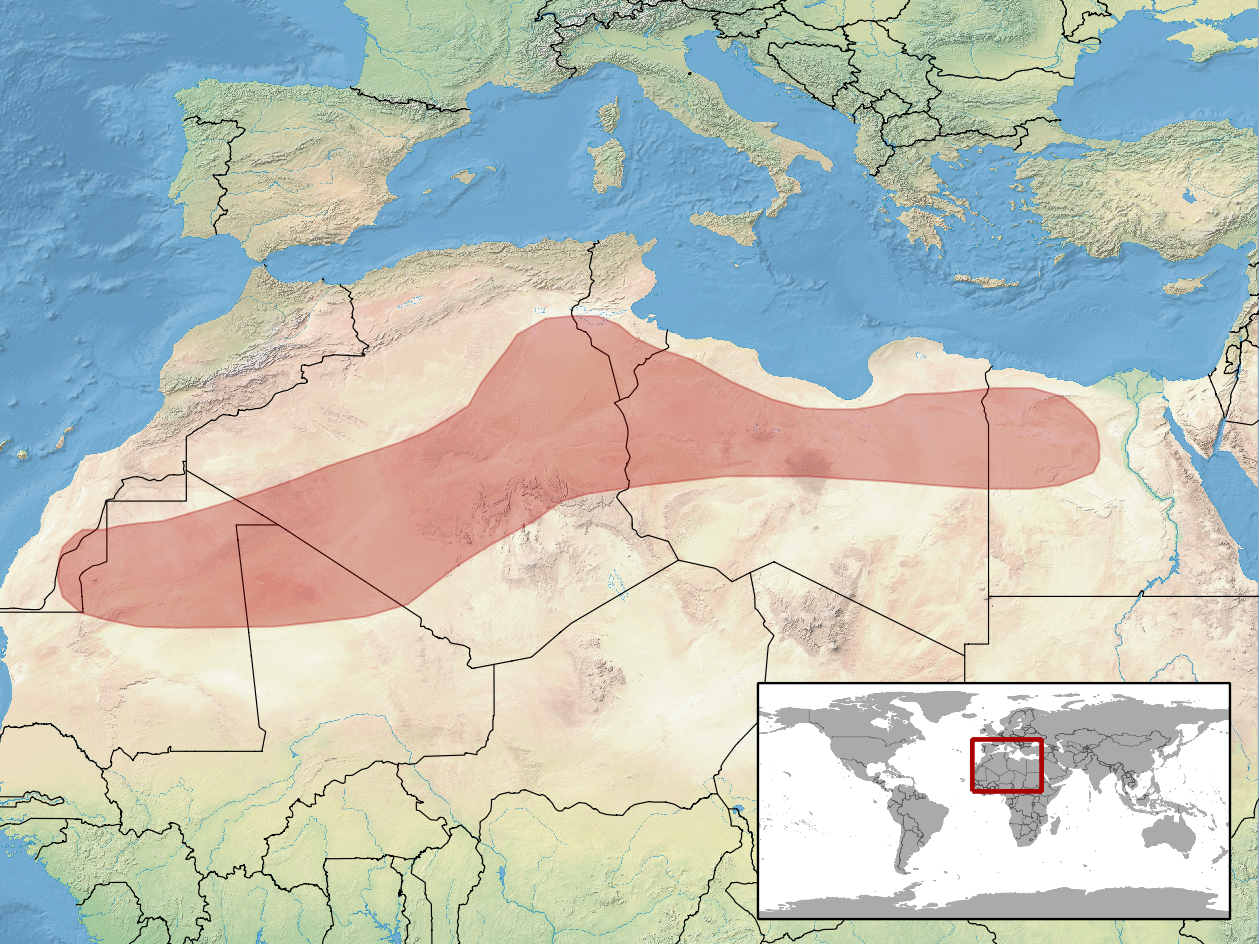

Species of gecko

Tropiocolotes tripolitanus, also known as the northern sand gecko or Tripoli gecko, is a species of gecko found in northern Africa.
