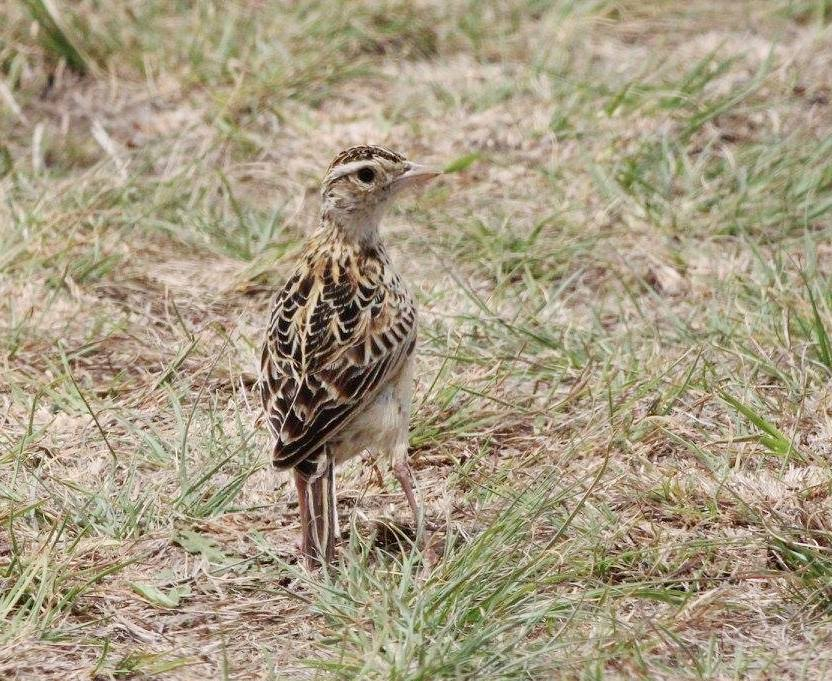
- in South Africa

Conservation status
- Endangered (IUCN 3.1)

Scientific classification
- Kingdom: Animalia
- Phylum: Chordata
- Class: Aves
- Order: Passeriformes
- Family: Alaudidae
- Genus: Heteromirafra
- Species: H. ruddi

Binomial name
- Heteromirafra ruddi (Grant, 1908)
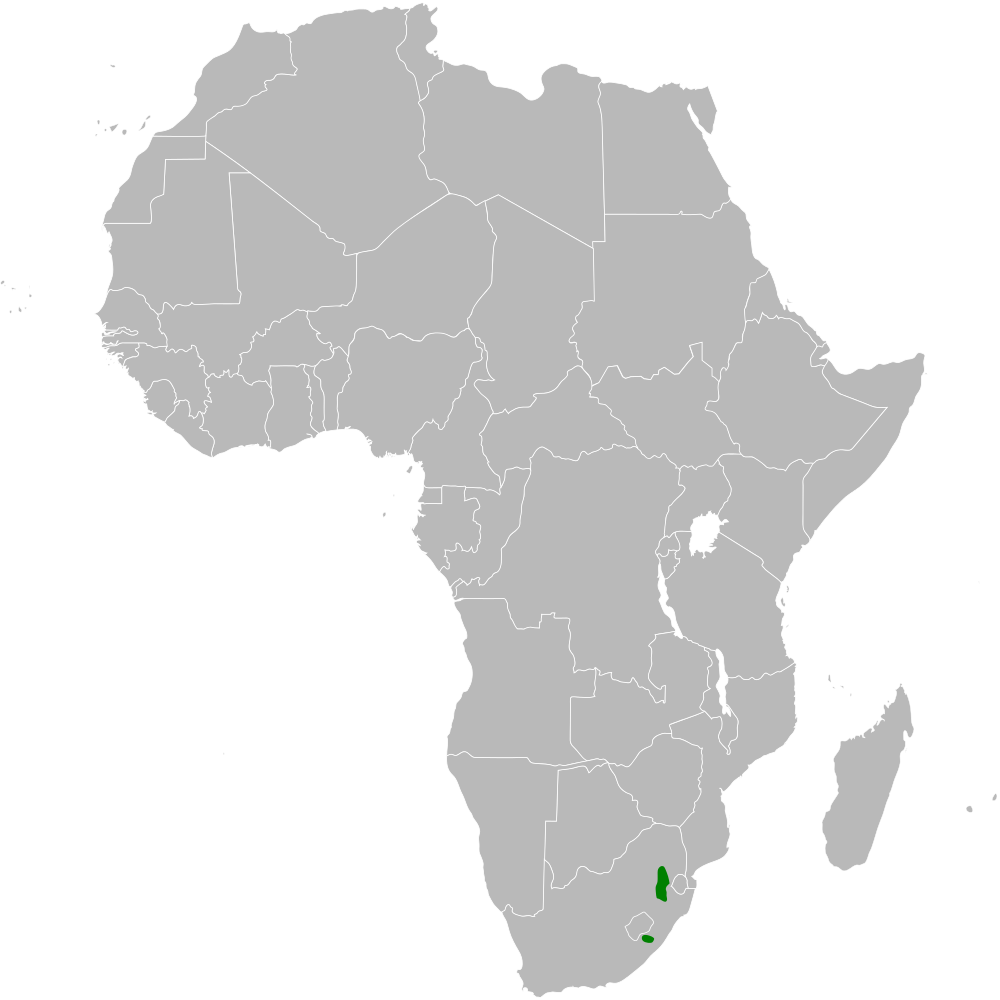
- distribution

Synonyms
- Heteronyx ruddi; Mirafra ruddi

= Rudd's lark =

Species of bird

Rudd's lark (Heteromirafra ruddi) is a species of lark in the family Alaudidae. It is endemic to South Africa. Its natural habitat is high-altitude grassland. It is threatened by habitat loss.

== Taxonomy and systematics ==
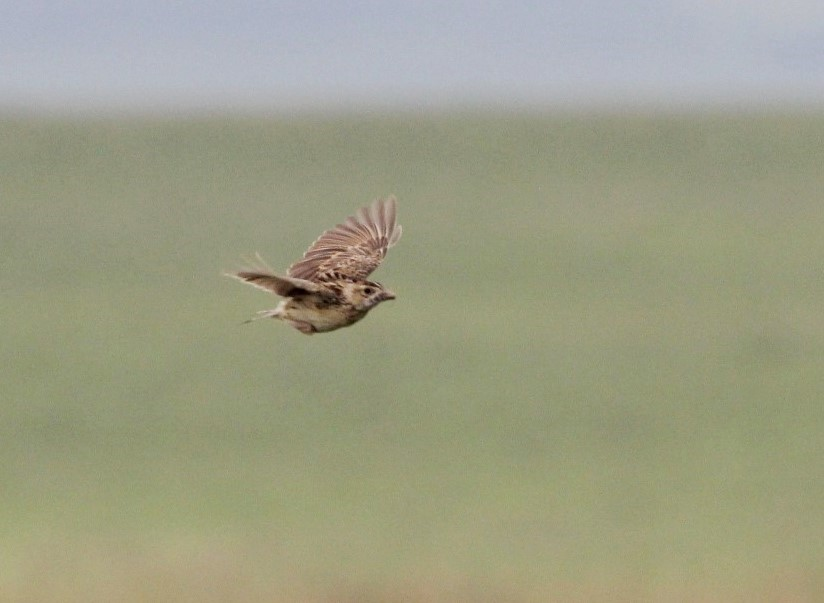
Bird in flight at Wakkerstroom, South Africa

Formerly, some authorities have classified Rudd's lark as belonging to the genus Mirafra. Previously, some authorities have also considered Archer's lark to be a subspecies of Rudd's lark (as Heteromirafra ruddi archeri). Alternate names for Rudd's lark include long-clawed lark, Rudd's long-clawed lark and South African long-clawed lark. The name "long-clawed lark" has been used to describe both Rudd's lark and Archer's lark.

== Social Behavior ==
It is typically found alone or in pairs.

== Diet ==
It eats insects and seeds.
