= Tropiocolotes hormozganensis =

Scientific classification
- Domain: Eukaryota
- Kingdom: Animalia
- Phylum: Chordata
- Class: Reptilia
- Order: Squamata
- Infraorder: Gekkota
- Family: Gekkonidae
- Genus: Tropiocolotes
- Species: T. hormozganensis

Binomial name
- Tropiocolotes hormozganensis Rounaghi et al., 2018

Species of gecko

Tropiocolotes hormozganensis is a species of gecko of the genus Tropiocolotes. It is found in the Hormozgan Province, Iran. The specific epithet hormozganensis relates to the type locality, the Hormozgan Province.
