= Soapbush =

Soapbush or soap bush can mean:

- Clidemia hirta, native to the American Neotropics, also found in Australia, Southern Asia and East Africa.
- Noltea africana, native to Southern Africa.
- Acacia holosericea (soapbush wattle), native to Australia.
- Trymalium odoratissimum (karri hazel), native to Western Australia.
- Guaiacum angustifolium, native to North America.
- Ceanothus integerrimus (more commonly known as deer bush), native to North America.
- Rhigozum trichotomum (Khalahari soapbush), native to Southern Africa.
- Helinus integrifolius (also known as soap plant or soap creeper), native to Southern Africa.

== See also ==
- Soapberry
- Alphitonia excelsa, soap tree
- Soapweed (disambiguation)
