= Soapweed =

Soapweed or soap weed can refer to:

- Soapweed, California
- Plants:
  - Saponaria officinalis
  - Yucca elata
  - Yucca glauca

== See also ==
- Soapberry
- Soapbush
