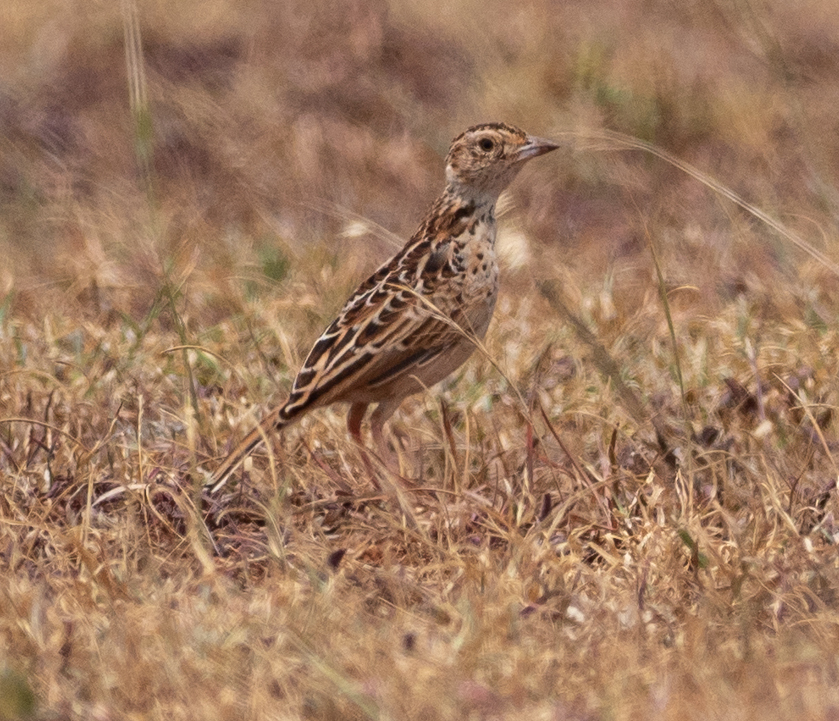

Conservation status
- Critically Endangered (IUCN 3.1)

Scientific classification
- Kingdom: Animalia
- Phylum: Chordata
- Class: Aves
- Order: Passeriformes
- Family: Alaudidae
- Genus: Heteromirafra
- Species: H. archeri

Binomial name
- Heteromirafra archeri Clarke, 1920
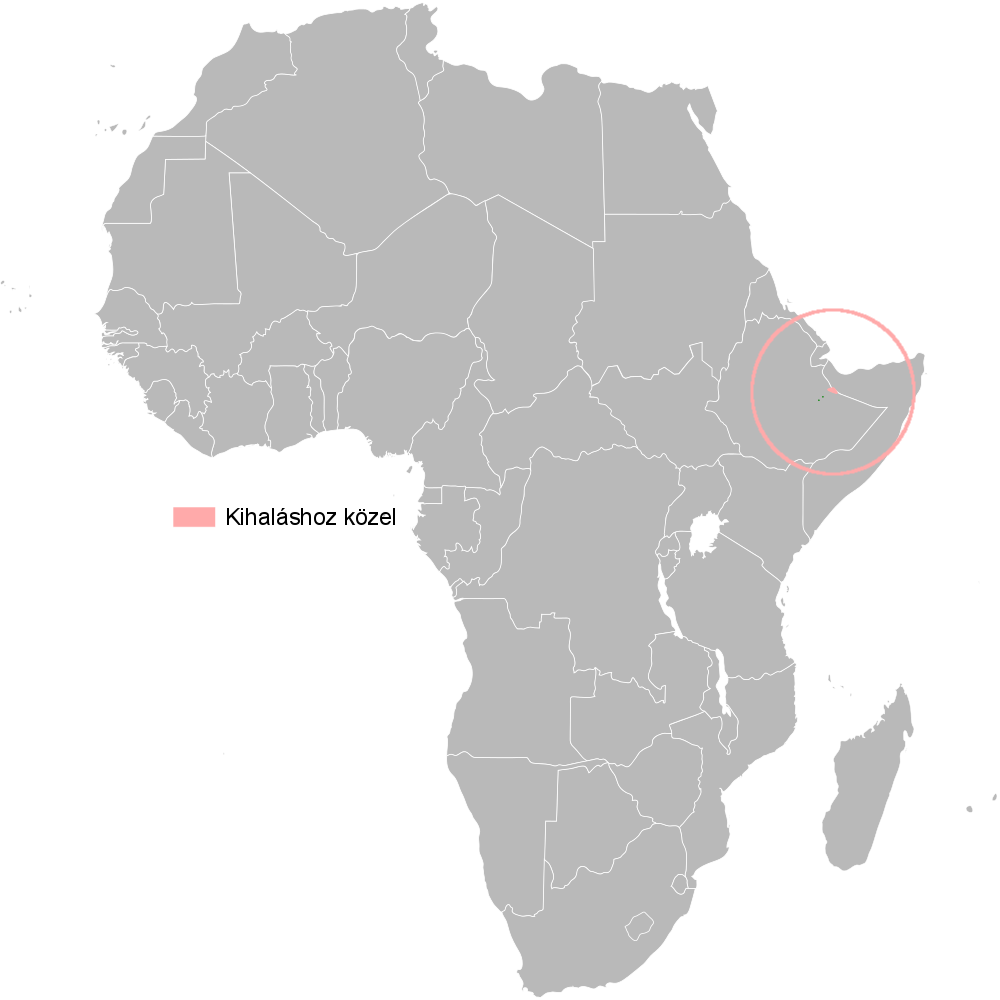

Synonyms
- Heteromirafra ruddi archeri; Mirafra archeri

= Archer's lark =

Species of bird

Archer's lark (Heteromirafra archeri), also known as the Liben lark, is a species of lark in the family Alaudidae. It is found in Somalia, Somaliland, and Ethiopia. Its natural habitats are subtropical or tropical dry shrubland and subtropical or tropical dry lowland grassland. It is threatened by habitat loss. The bird's common name and binomial commemorate the British explorer and colonial official Sir Geoffrey Francis Archer.

== Taxonomy and systematics ==
Formerly, the Liben lark has been considered by some authorities as belonging to the genus Mirafra. The Sidamo lark was previously considered as a separate species (as H. sidamoensis) and by some authorities as a subspecies of Liben lark (as H. a. sidamoensis), but since 2014 has been considered conspecific with the Liben lark. Note that the alternate names "long-clawed lark" and "Sidamo lark" are also used as alternate names by Rudd's lark and Degodi lark respectively. Some authorities have also considered Archer's lark to be a subspecies of Rudd's lark. The alternate name "Somali lark" is more commonly used by the species of the same name, Mirafra somalica, but also as an alternate name for Sharpe's lark. Other alternate names for the Liben lark include Archer's long-clawed lark, Ethiopian long-clawed lark, Sidamo bushlark, Sidamo long-clawed lark and Somali long-clawed lark.

== Description ==
The Liben lark is about 14 cm (5.5 in) long, with a relatively large head and short, plump body. It has buff underparts with a streaky breast. Its plumage is predominantly brown and reddish brown. It has a short, thin tail which is brown with white outer feathers. The call is unknown.

== Behaviour ==
The birds are largely terrestrial and their behaviour is cryptic. Though quite capable of flight, they often prefer to conceal themselves in vegetation.

=== Breeding ===
Nests have been found in summer. Clutch-size is three.

=== Feeding ===
Its diet is likely to consist of seeds and small invertebrates, including worms.

== Distribution and habitat ==
The bird's preferred habitat is open grasslands and rocky country, vegetated with tussocky perennial grasses and having an annual rainfall of 300–400 mm (12–16 in). The total area in which Liben lark can be found is estimated to be only 52 km^{2} (20 mi^{2}), largely in Ethiopia. The birds have not been recorded from the Wajaale clay plains on the border of Ethiopia and Somaliland since 1922. Due to habitat loss, Archer's lark has not been found in Somalia since at least 1970.

== Status and conservation ==
The population is estimated to number 50–250 mature individuals, based on a lack of confirmed sightings despite several searches having been conducted since 1955 in Somalia and Ethiopia. One of the last possible sightings of the bird was in Ethiopia in 2003. The species was declared critically endangered in 2005 and a conversation program to restore and protect grasslands has been initiated.

In 2011, David Hoddinott and his bird watching group had a sighting of a bird that may have been a Liben lark in north-eastern Ethiopia. They were able to get a photograph which is being studied to confirm the observation.

=== Threats ===
Human activities in the Negele plateau are causing the loss of crucial grassland habitat for the Liben lark. These activities include the encroachment of Acacia drepanolobium bushes. The enforcement of fire suppression measures since the 1980s may have worsened this issue by reducing available grassland.

The region's local human population is under increasing pressure due to the arrival of refugees from drought-stricken and tribal conflict areas. This has led to a transition from nomadic pastoralism to permanent cultivation, posing a significant threat to the species. Moreover, the development of a watering point in the core of the species' range has led to livestock concentration, causing habitat disturbance, overgrazing, and trampling.

The Liben lark's habitat continues to degrade, possibly due to overgrazing and the conversion of grassland into cultivated land. Between 2010 and 2011, a significant portion of grassland on the northern side of the Liben Plain was lost to agriculture. While a military training area was previously considered a potential threat, it was abandoned by July 2005. Nevertheless, concerns persist regarding environmental changes, including drought and rising temperatures.

Historical land use by refugees in the Liben lark's original grassland site in Somaliland led to the loss of essential grasses. Though the refugees have departed, intensive farming, grazing, and habitat disruption continue. Settlements, fires, and invasive species exacerbate habitat loss, threatening the Liben lark's survival.
