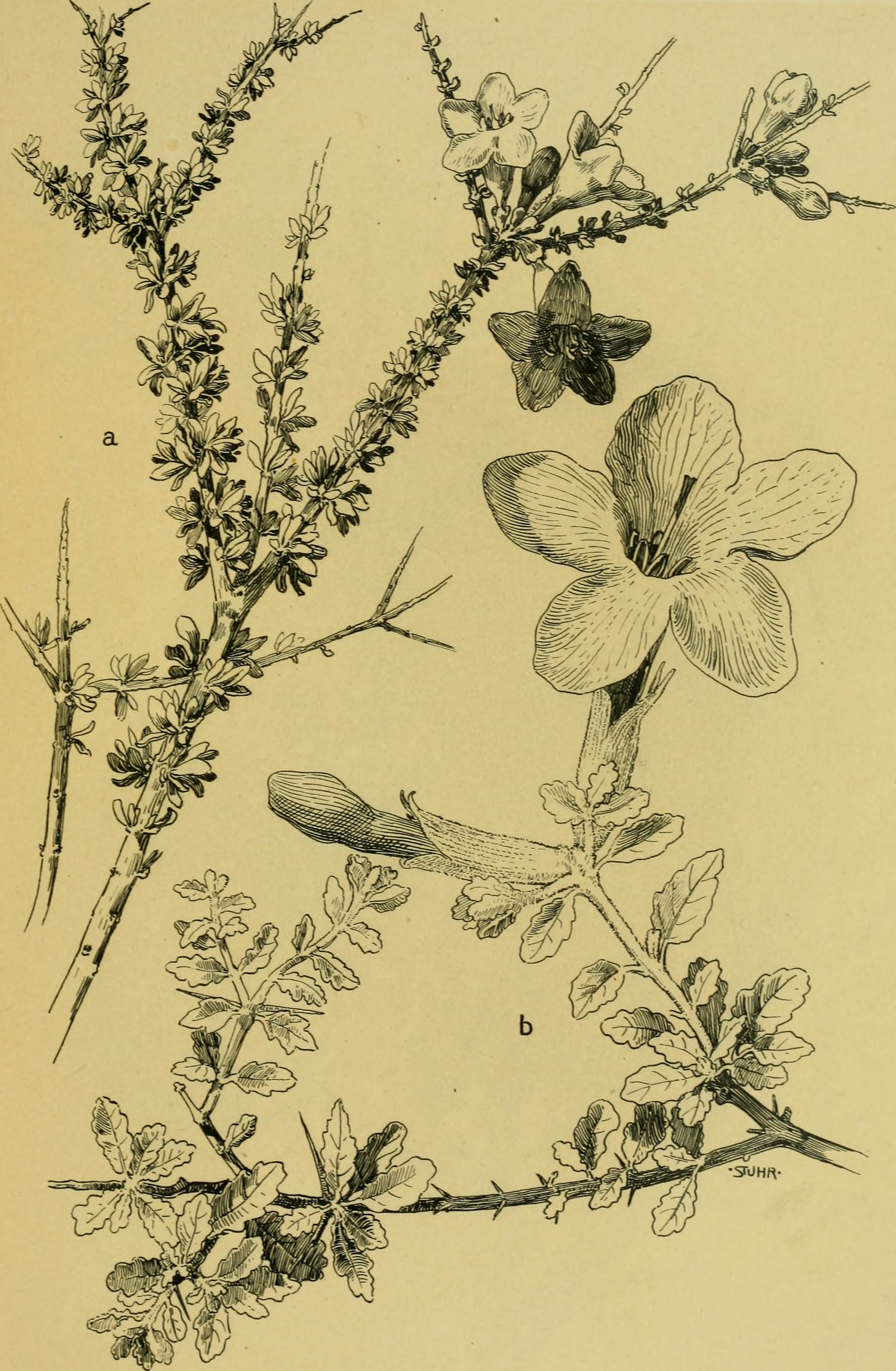

Scientific classification
- Kingdom: Plantae
- Clade: Tracheophytes
- Clade: Angiosperms
- Clade: Eudicots
- Clade: Asterids
- Order: Lamiales
- Family: Bignoniaceae
- Genus: Rhigozum
- Species: R. trichotomum

Binomial name
- Rhigozum trichotomum Burch.

= Rhigozum trichotomum =

Species of flowering plant

Rhigozum trichotomum is a shrub that is native from Angola to South Africa. It is found mainly in the Nama Karoo and is listed on the SANBI red list as 'safe' (LC). It is a woody perennial shrub that grows 1–2 m tall with thorny twigs that often branch in threes. It bears small leaves that it loses in the dry season, and produces small white flowers with yellow centers. Overgrazed areas can become covered with this plant. This indicates poor land management, and can maks the soil prone to erosion. The plant is not palatable, but acts as a nurse plant for other young plants. It occurs in areas with rainfall of 50–350 mm per year.
