= Parker's pigmy gecko =

Scientific classification
- Kingdom: Animalia
- Phylum: Chordata
- Class: Reptilia
- Order: Squamata
- Suborder: Gekkota
- Family: Gekkonidae
- Genus: Tropiocolotes
- Species: T. somalicus

Binomial name
- Tropiocolotes somalicus Parker, 1942

Species of gecko

The Parker's pigmy gecko (Tropiocolotes somalicus) is a species of gecko of the genus Tropiocolotes. It is found in Somalia, Ethiopia and Djibouti.
