= Yangudi Rassa National Park =

National park in Afar Region, Ethiopia

- IUCN category II (national park)
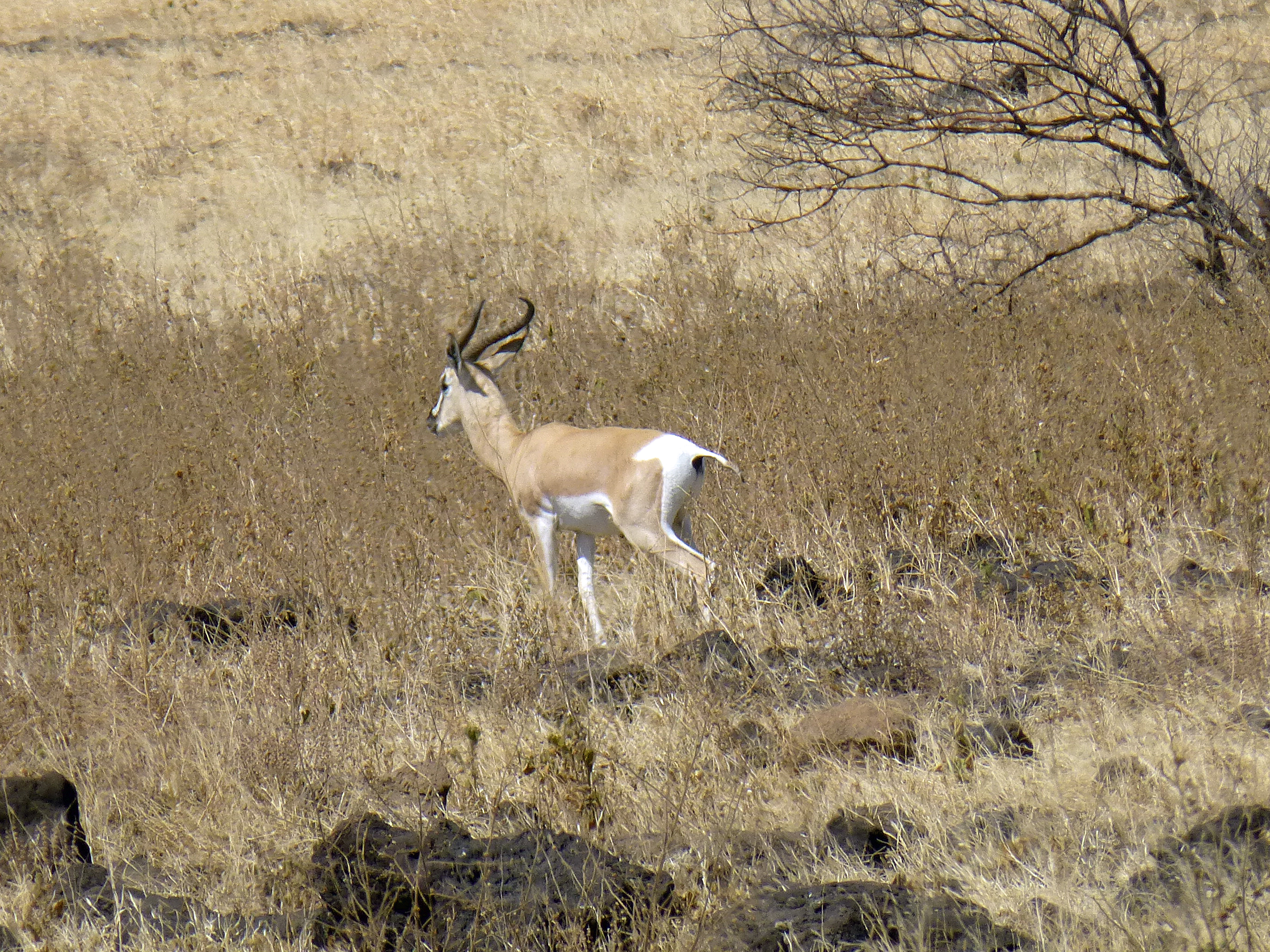
- Soemmerring's gazelle in the park

- Location within Ethiopia
- Location: Afar Region, Ethiopia
- Coordinates: 11°0′N 40°50′E
- Area: 4,731 km^{2} (1,827 sq mi)
- Designation: National park
- Designated: 1969
- Governing body: Ethiopian Wildlife Conservation Authority

Yangudi Rassa National Park (Amharic: ያንጉዲ ራሳ ብሔራዊ ፓርክ, romanized: yanigudī rasa biḥērawī pariki) is a national park in Ethiopia located in Afar Region.

== Geography ==
Its 4,731 square kilometres (1,827 sq mi) of territory include Mount Yangudi (1,383 m or 4,537 ft) near the southern boundary and the surrounding Rassa Plains, with altitudes from 400 to 1,459 m (1,312 to 4,787 ft) above sea level. The Awash River flows through the park from south to north.

The park headquarters are south of the park in Gewane. The Awash-Asseb highway runs north and south through the park.

The park adjoins Mille-Serdo Wildlife Reserve to the north, Awash West Controlled Hunting Area to the west, and Gewane Wildlife Reserve to the south.

== Flora ==
Sandy semi-desert and wooded grassland cover the majority of the park's area. Native grasses include Aristida sp., Chrysopogon plumulosus, Dactyloctenium scindicum, Digitaria sp., Lasiurus scindicus, and Sporobolus ioclados, which provide fodder for wild grazing animals and livestock. There are marshes and riverine forests along the Awash River.

== Fauna ==
Yangudi Rassa National Park is home to 36 species of mammals and 200 species of birds recorded within the park's biome. It was proposed to protect the Somali wild ass (Equus africanus somaliensis), a subspecies of African wild ass. The wild asses graze on grasses and live in small groups. Recently, the wild ass became extinct in Yagundi Rassa. However, there is a small population in the adjacent Mille-Serdo Wildlife Reserve (8,766 km^{2}).

Large animals native to the park include gerenuk, Soemmerring's gazelle, Beisa oryx, lion, Grevy's zebra, cheetah, and leopard. Other animals that live within the protected areas includes Dorcas Gazelle, Hamadryas Baboon, Bat-eared Fox, Black-backed Jackal, Striped Hyena, and Aardwolf.

Bird species of interest include lesser flamingo (Phoeniconaias minor), pale rockfinch (Carpospiza brachydactyla) and Arabian bustard (Ardeotis arabs). Lesser Kestrel and Pallid Harrier are only known Somali-Masai Biome species in the park that considered globally threatened. Other bird species that roam consist of the Terek Sandpiper, Somali ostrich, Common Sandpiper, Common Redshank, Woodchat Shrike, Lesser Grey Shrike, Eurasian blackcap, and Ortolan Bunting.

== Conservation ==
The park was designated in 1969 by the Ethiopian Government. The park was not formally gazetted, and for decades the Ethiopian Wildlife Conservation Authority (EWCA) lacked sufficient funding and staffing to effectively manage the park.

The local people are Afar pastoralists, who graze livestock inside and adjacent to the park.

== See also ==
- List of protected areas of Ethiopia
