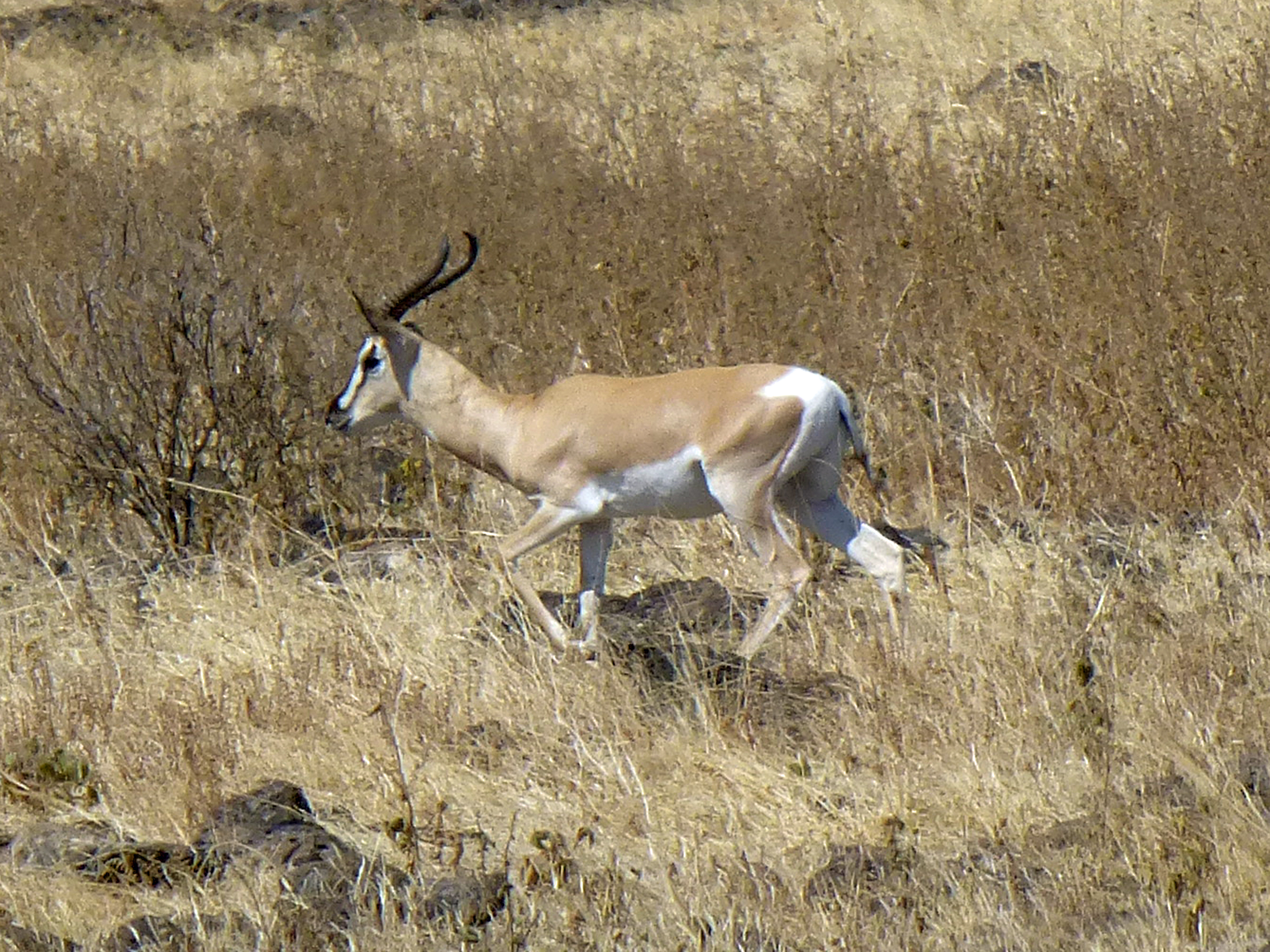
- Soemmerring's gazelle at Yangudi Rassa National Park, Ethiopia

Conservation status
- Vulnerable (IUCN 3.1)

Scientific classification
- Kingdom: Animalia
- Phylum: Chordata
- Class: Mammalia
- Infraclass: Placentalia
- Order: Artiodactyla
- Family: Bovidae
- Subfamily: Antilopinae
- Genus: Nanger
- Species: N. soemmerringii

Binomial name
- Nanger soemmerringii (Cretzschmar, 1828)
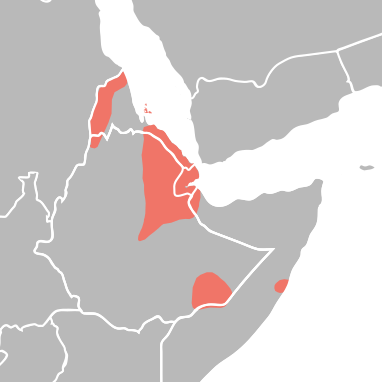
- Nanger soemmerringii distribution

Synonyms
- Gazella soemmerringii (Cretzschmar, 1826) *protonym*

= Soemmerring's gazelle =

Species of mammal

Soemmerring's gazelle (Nanger soemmerringii), also known as the Abyssinian mohr, is a gazelle species native to the Horn of Africa (Djibouti, Eritrea, Ethiopia, Somalia and South Sudan). The species was first described and given its scientific name by German physician Philipp Jakob Cretzschmar in 1828. Three subspecies are recognized. It is possibly no longer present in Sudan.

Since 1986, Soemmerring's gazelle has been classified as Vulnerable by the International Union for Conservation of Nature (IUCN).

== Taxonomy and evolution ==
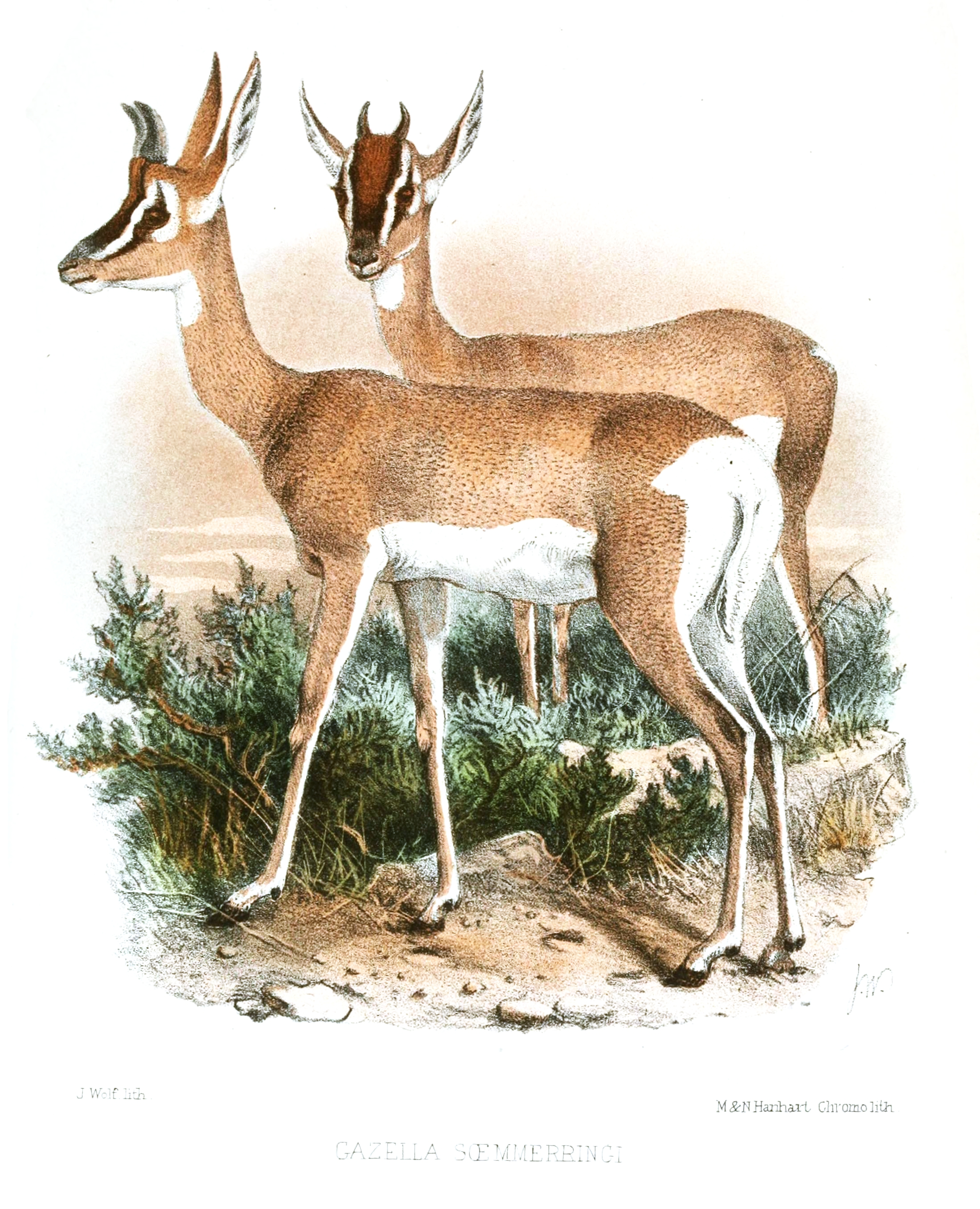
Illustration of Soemmerring's gazelle (1867).

The scientific name of Soemmerring's gazelle is Nanger soemmerringii. Formerly considered a member of the genus Gazella within the subgenus Nanger before Nanger was elevated to genus status, Soemmerring's gazelle is a member of the family Bovidae. The species was described and given its binomial name by German physician Philipp Jakob Cretzschmar in the In Rüppell, Atlas zu der reise im nördlichen Afrika ("Atlas of Rüppell's Travels in Northern Africa"; 1826–28) in 1828. Soemmerring's gazelle is named after German physician Samuel Thomas von Sömmerring.

Soemmerring's gazelle is closely related to Grant's gazelle (N. granti) and Thomson's gazelle (Eudorcas thomsonii).

=== Subspecies ===
Traditionally, three subspecies are recognized:

- Nubian Soemmerring's gazelle (N. s. soemmeringii) (Cretzschmar, 1828)
- Somali Soemmerring's gazelle (N. s. berberana) (Matschie, 1893)
- Borani Soemmerring's gazelle (N. s. butteri) (Thomas, 1904)

The dwarf population on Dahlak Kebir island might also qualify as a subspecies.

== Physical description ==
Soemmerring's gazelle is a tall gazelle with tan flanks, gradually turning to white on the belly, and long black horns. They are about 75–90 cm (2.5–3.0 ft) at the shoulder, and they weigh 35–45 kg (77-99 lb).

Soemmerring's and Grant's gazelles' outward appearance are so similar, they are often mistaken for each other where their ranges overlap.

== Distribution and habitat ==
Soemmerring's gazelles is native to the Horn of Africa. It lives in Djibouti, Eritrea, Ethiopia, Somalia and South Sudan. However, it is extinct in Sudan. They inhabit open steppes with brush and acacia, as well as steppes with few trees. At some point in history, a Soemmerring's gazelle population became isolated on Dahlak Kebir island in the Dahlak Archipelago, where the gazelle actually developed a dwarf form of the larger mainland races.

== Ecology and behavior ==
=== Diet ===
The diet of the gazelle consists of acacia and bush leaves, grasses, and herbs.

=== Reproduction ===
Scientists suggest the males are temporarily territorial. The lifespan for this animal is up to 14 years.

== Threats ==
Soemmerring's gazelle is listed as Vulnerable in the IUCN Red List.

In many parts of North Africa and the Middle East, large stone corrals were constructed to drive herds of gazelle into, making for an easy ambush. This method of hunting started in prehistoric time, and continued into the early part of the 20th century.

Most species of gazelles have been hunted for food over the course of history. Soemmerring's gazelles are very understudied due to their small numbers. In parts of their former range they are extirpated due to hunting and habitat destruction.

The British businessman and zoo-keeper Alistair McAlpine, described in his 2002 memoir, Adventures Of A Collector, the effect the Gulf War had had on the species as well as others in the region:

A small group of the extremely rare Sömmering's gazelles, along with many other animals in the Old Botanical Gardens of Kuwait City, have been shot by soldiers from Iraq. It is, however, the loss of the plans of the Kuwaiti government to establish a national park along the border with Iraq that is the real tragedy - a park where they intended to reintroduce the Houbara bustard and the Arabian gazelle, a desert reserve to which many of the species now extinct in this region would return.
