= Rhigozum somalense =

Scientific classification
- Kingdom: Plantae
- Clade: Tracheophytes
- Clade: Angiosperms
- Clade: Eudicots
- Clade: Asterids
- Order: Lamiales
- Family: Bignoniaceae
- Genus: Rhigozum
- Species: R. somalense

Binomial name
- Rhigozum somalense Hallier f.

Species of flowering plant

Rhigozum somalense is a perennial shrub that is part of the Bignoniaceae family. The plant is native to Djibouti, Eritrea, Ethiopia, Yemen and Somalia.
