= Hermann Steudner =

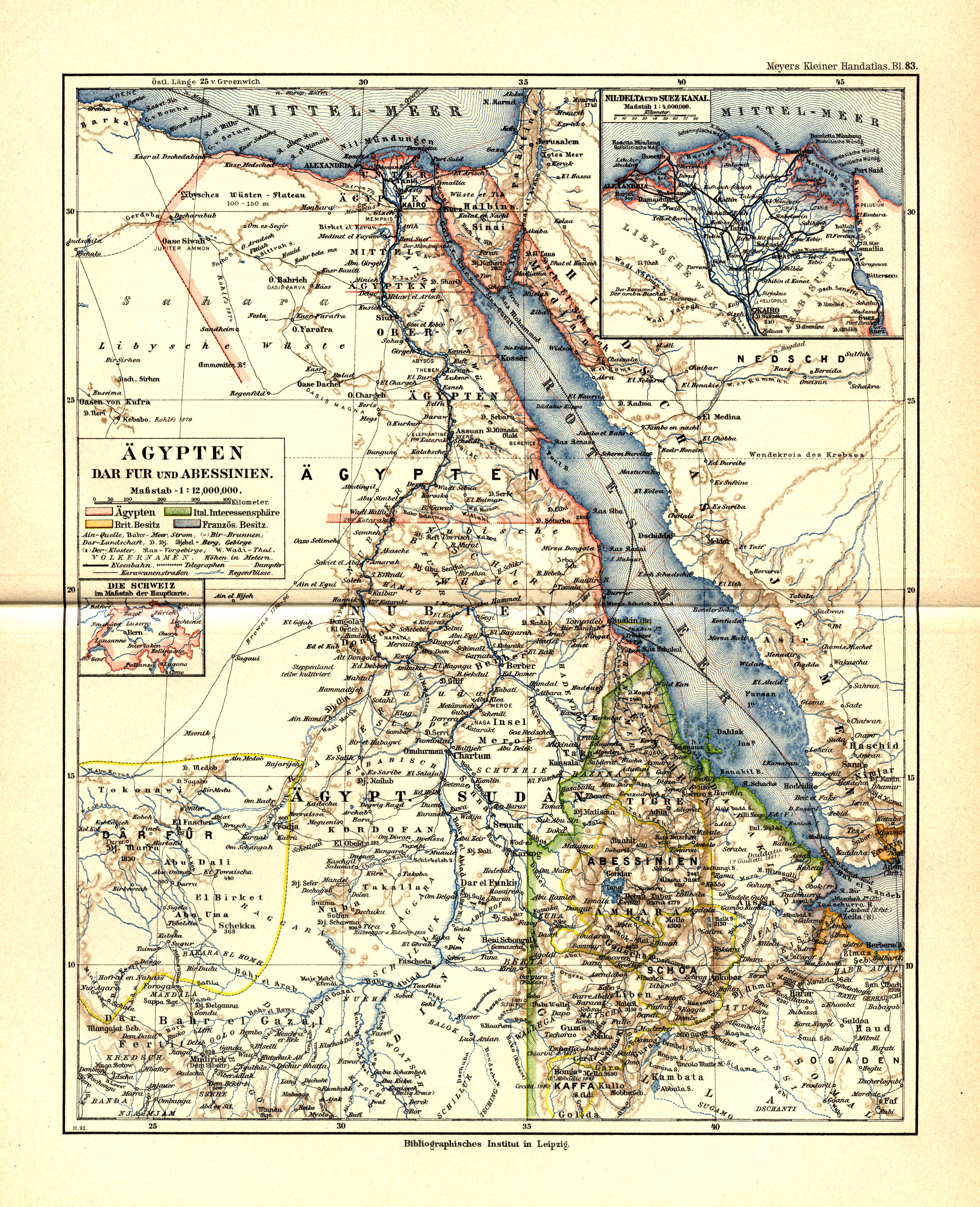
Map of the countries visited

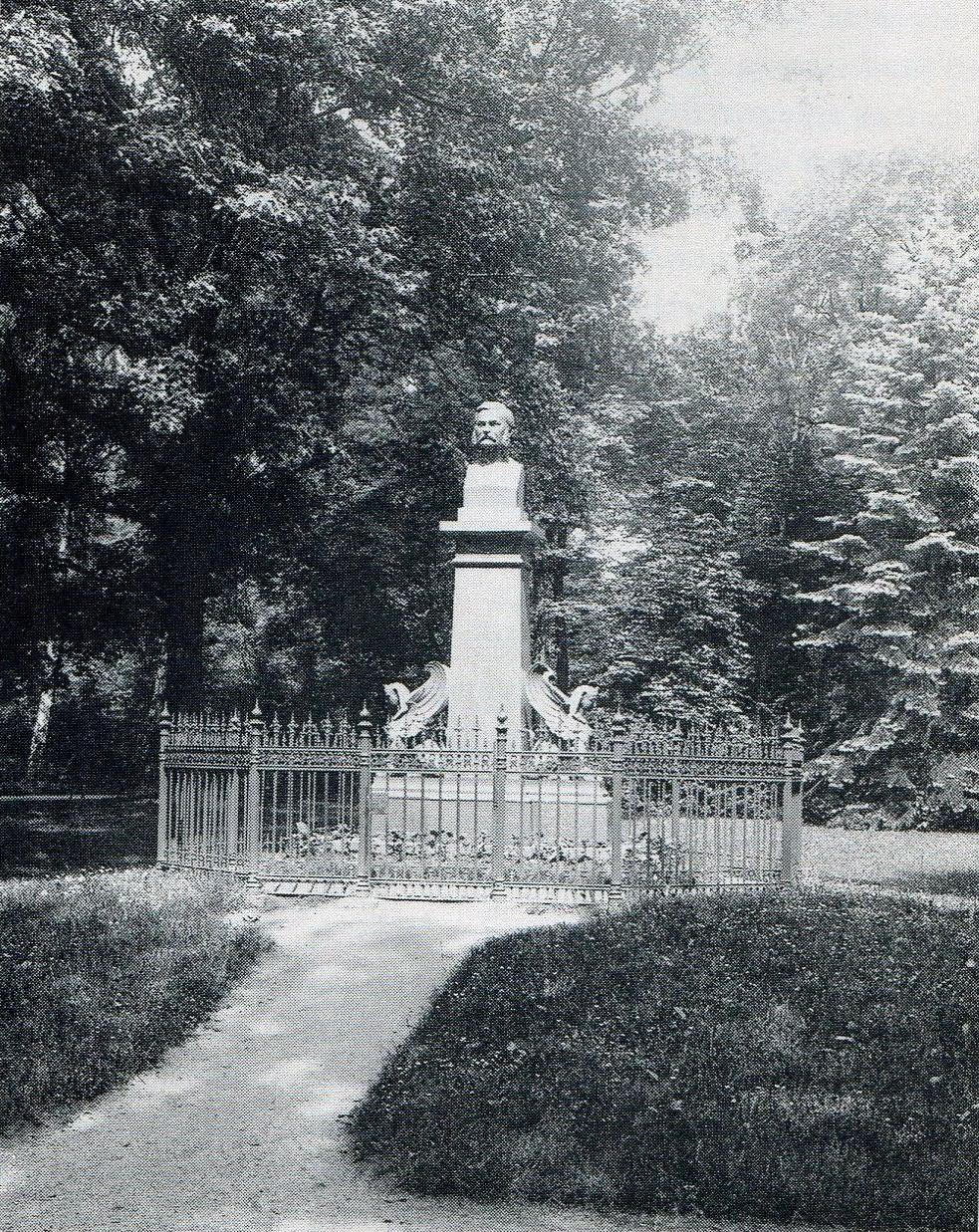
Steudner monument in Görlitz

Carl Theodor Hermann Steudner (1 September 1832 – 10 April 1863) was a botanist and an explorer of Africa.

== Education and early work ==
Steudner was born in Greiffenberg, located in Silesia, but grew up in Görlitz. He studied botany, mineralogy, and medicine in Berlin and Würzburg. Among his professors were Christian Gottfried Ehrenberg, Heinrich Wilhelm Dove, and Carl Ritter in Berlin; and Rudolf Virchow, Franz von Rinecker, and Albert von Kölliker in Würzburg, where he began his friendship with Ernst Haeckel.

Having returned to Berlin, Steudner devoted himself to botany and published on Marantaceae. He was elected a member of the Berlin Society of Friends of Natural Science.

== Expedition to Africa ==
Heinrich Barth of the Gesellschaft für Erdkunde zu Berlin convinced Steudner to participate in an African expedition to search for Eduard Vogel, whose traces had been lost in the Ouaddai Empire. This expedition was initiated by Ernest II, Duke of Saxe-Coburg and Gotha. The expedition was led by Theodor von Heuglin and started on 4 March 1861 in Alexandria. After sailing over the Red Sea they landed at Massawa on 17 June 1861 and observed birds on Dahlak Archipelago. Their way through the Ethiopian Highlands led them to Keren in the country of the Bilen people, from where Werner Munzinger came to join them, and afterwards to Adwa, where they met Wilhelm Schimper. Here the expedition split into two parties. Steudner remained at Heuglin. They made a wide detour through the Galla country in order to search for Tewodros II of Ethiopia. After visiting Gondar and Magdala they came to Edschebet, where they were guests of Tewodros. From Lake Tana they turned north. By way of the Blue Nile, they reached Khartoum in July 1862.

Because of this detour, the leadership of the expedition was taken from Heuglin. They used the break to visit Kurdufan, where they followed the traces of Theodor Kotschy. On 25 January 1863 they joined Alexine Tinne on her tour up the White Nile to the Bahr el Ghasal. Steudner died of fever on 10 April 1863 in Waw near the Jur River.

== Honors ==
Steudner visited regions which had never been explored by a botanist before. Hence, his careful reports were of high importance. Renowned herbariums, such as Kew Royal Botanic Gardens London, Natural History Museum London, Muséum national d'Histoire naturelle Paris, Swedish Museum of Natural History Stockholm, and South African National Biodiversity Institute National Herbarium Pretoria, keep specimens that he collected.

The Steudner's dwarf gecko (Tropiocolotes steudneri) is named after Steudner. Also, Karl Koch, a friend of Steudner, named the plant genus Steudnera (subfamily Aroideae, family Araceae) in honor of Steudner.

In Görlitz, a monument was erected, but it was largely destroyed in World War II to use the metal for military purposes.
