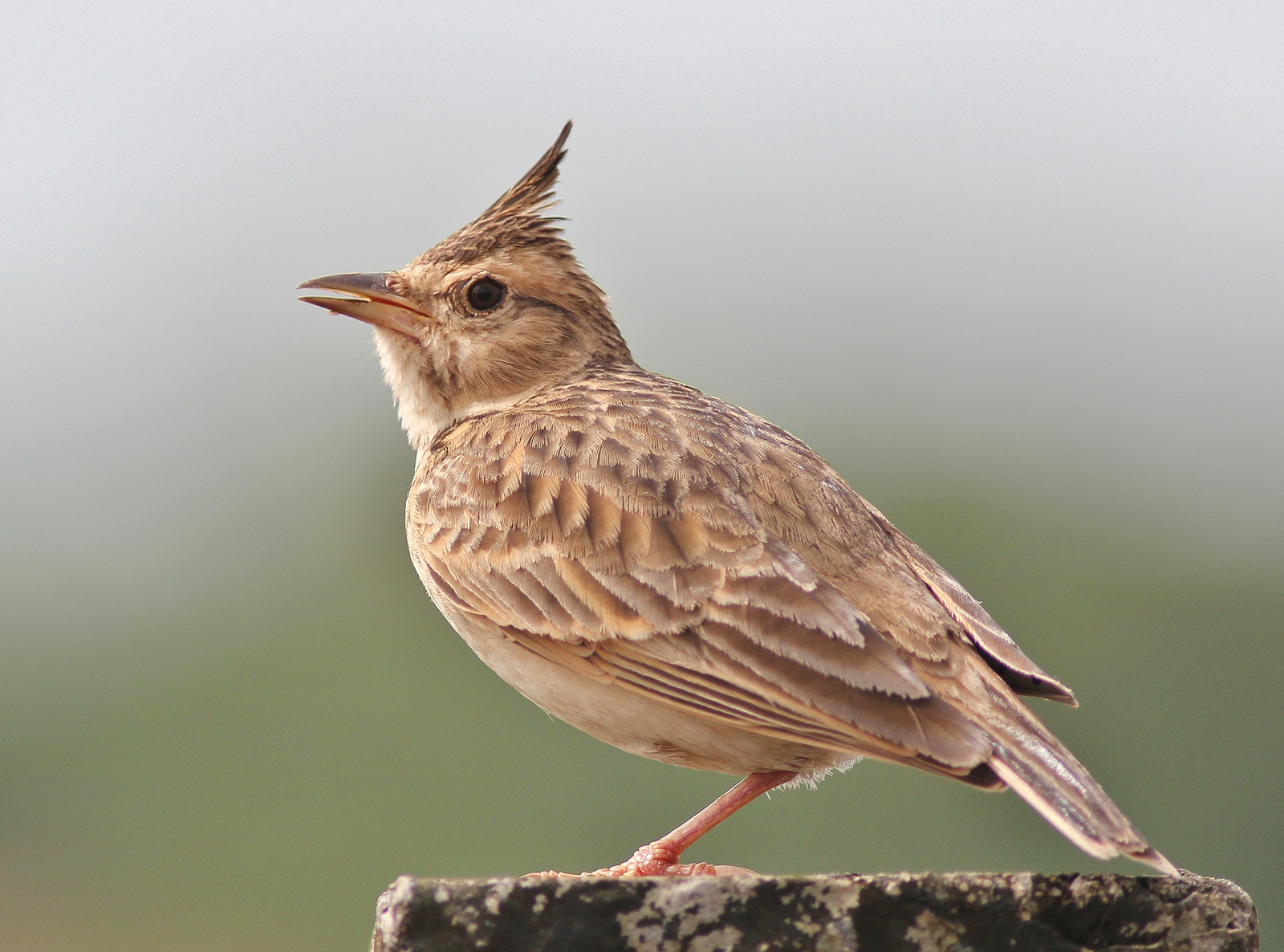
- Clicked at Madayipara, Kerala, India

Conservation status
- Least Concern (IUCN 3.1)

Scientific classification
- Kingdom: Animalia
- Phylum: Chordata
- Class: Aves
- Order: Passeriformes
- Family: Alaudidae
- Genus: Galerida
- Species: G. malabarica

Binomial name
- Galerida malabarica (Scopoli, 1786)
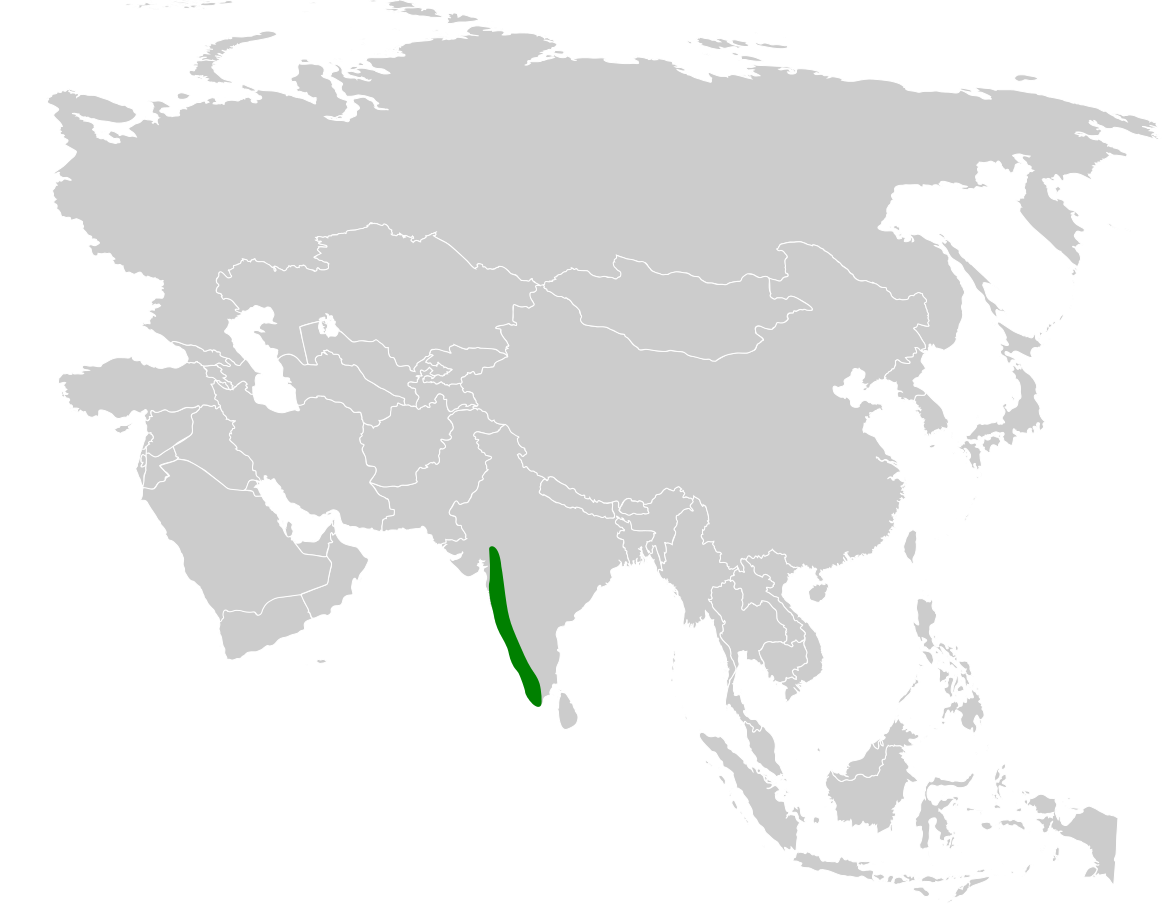

Synonyms
- Alauda malabarica

= Malabar lark =

Species of bird

The Malabar lark, or Malabar crested lark (Galerida malabarica) is a species of lark in the family Alaudidae found in western India.

== Taxonomy and systematics ==
Originally, the Malabar lark was classified in the genus Alauda before being moved to its present genus. Also, some authorities have considered the Thekla lark to be a subspecies of the Malabar lark.

== Description ==
This is a smallish lark, slightly smaller than the Eurasian skylark. It has a long spiky erectile crest. It is greyer than the skylark, and lacks the white wing and tail edges of that species, which is a winter visitor to India.

It is very similar to the crested lark, which breeds in northern India. The Malabar lark is smaller and dark-streaked reddish brown in plumage, whereas the crested lark is grey. The belly is white. The sexes are similar.

Sykes's lark is another Indian relative that also has reddish-brown plumage, but is smaller, shorter-billed, with a stiff upright crest and has plain rufous underparts.

== Distribution and habitat ==
The Malabar lark is found in western India. It is a common bird of open country, cultivation and scrub, often at some altitude.

== Behaviour and ecology ==
The Malabar lark is a sedentary breeding bird that nests on the ground, laying two or three eggs. Its food is seeds and insects, the latter especially in the breeding season.

== Gallery ==
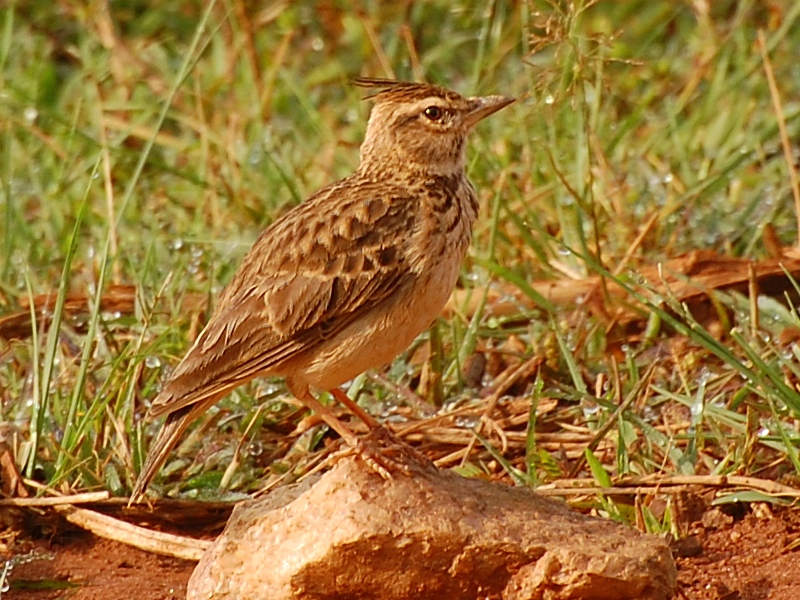
Malabar lark, Sakleshpur, India

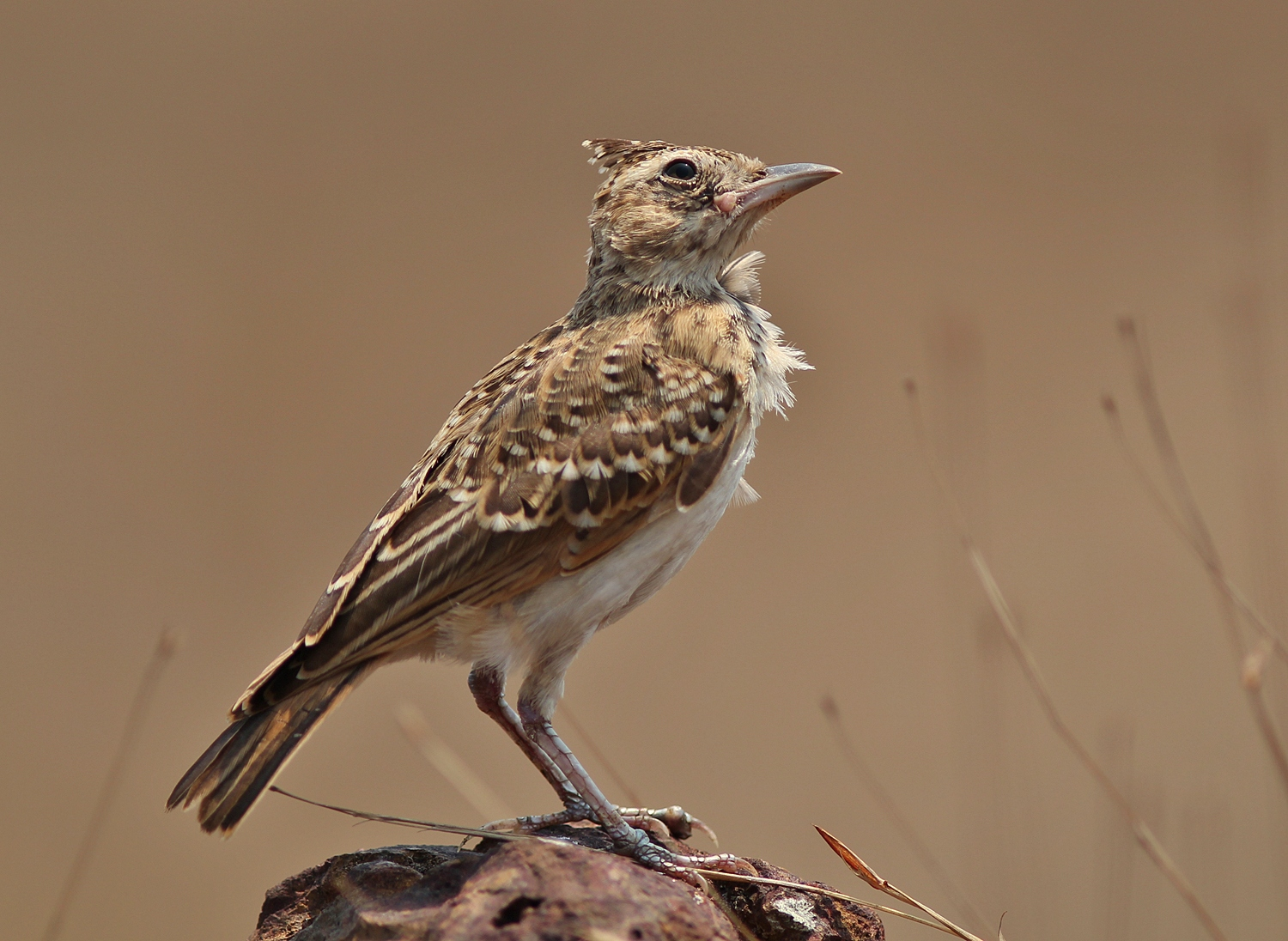
In Kannur, Kerala, India
