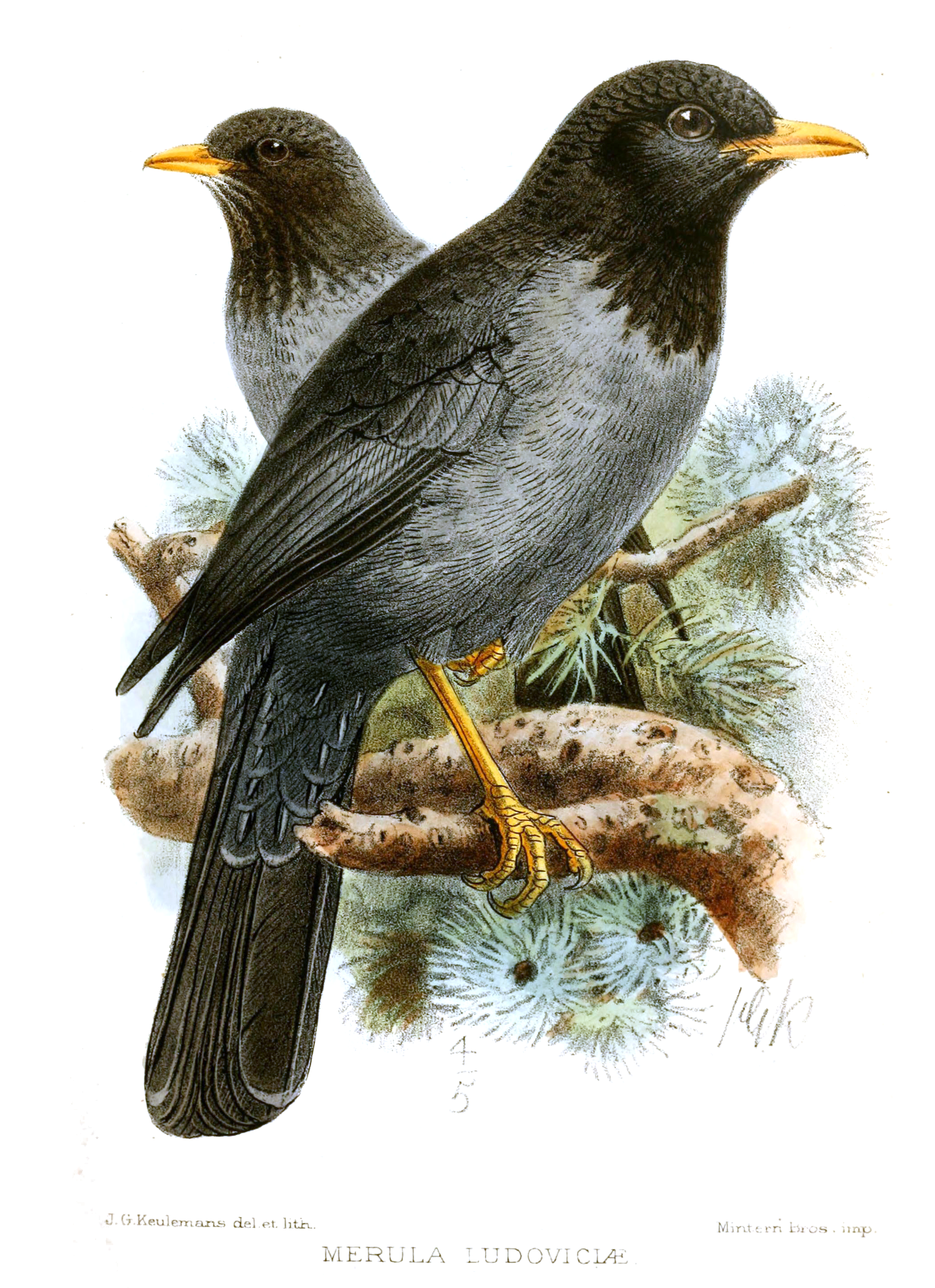

Conservation status
- Least Concern (IUCN 3.1)

Scientific classification
- Kingdom: Animalia
- Phylum: Chordata
- Class: Aves
- Order: Passeriformes
- Family: Turdidae
- Genus: Turdus
- Species: T. ludoviciae

Binomial name
- Turdus ludoviciae (Lort Phillips, 1895)

= Somali thrush =

Species of bird

The Somali thrush (Turdus ludoviciae), also known as the Somali blackbird, is a songbird species in the family Turdidae. It is endemic to Somalia.

It has a black head and breast, yellow bill, brown back and wings and a grey belly with red sides.

Its natural habitats are montane juniper woodlands and open areas between 1,300 and 2,000 m. It is threatened by habitat loss and was formerly classified as Critically Endangered by the IUCN. Recent research has found that the loss of habitat is not as severe as first feared and the species is downlisted to Least Concern in 2021. Local conservation efforts have apparently aided in the protection of forests.
