= Victor Loche =

French soldier and naturalist (1806–1863)

Victor Jean-François Loche (29 March 1806 – 28 June 1863) was a French military officer and naturalist who served in Algeria and made significant contributions to the zoological knowledge of North Africa. He is best known for first describing the sand cat (Felis margarita) in 1858.

== Biography ==
Loche was born on 29 March 1806 in Mandres, in the Eure department of Normandy, France. He pursued a military career and at various points is referred to in published sources as capitaine (captain) and commandant (major). He was appointed a Knight of the Légion d'honneur in 1851.

Loche spent much of his active life in Algeria, combining his military duties with natural history observation and collection. He served as director of the permanent zoological exhibition at the Natural History Museum of Algiers and concurrently directed the Algiers Zoological Garden. He died on 28 June 1863 in Bône (modern Annaba), Algeria, from fever.

== Scientific work ==
=== Exploration scientifique de l'Algérie ===
From 1853 onward, Loche served as naturalist for the Exploration scientifique de l'Algérie, a large French government-sponsored survey of Algeria's natural history, geography, and culture, undertaken following the French conquest of Algeria. The project resulted in a multi-volume series published in Paris between 1844 and 1867. Loche was assigned responsibility for the zoological survey of birds and mammals, and his volumes were among the last to appear in the series, published posthumously in 1867. The birds volumes comprised two parts totalling more than 750 pages with fifteen colour-printed plates, while the mammals volume ran to 123 pages with seven colour-printed engraved plates.

=== 1856–1857 Saharan expedition and the sand cat ===
In 1856–1857, Loche took part in a French military and scientific expedition into the Algerian Sahara. The expedition was led by Jean Auguste Margueritte (1823–1870), a French army officer commanding forces in Algeria. During the traverse of the northern Sahara the party passed through the region of Négonça (sometimes rendered Négousa or Ngouca), in the eastern Algerian desert.

At Négonça, Loche collected specimens of a small wild cat previously unknown to science. He formally described the species in 1858 in a short paper, "Description d'une nouvelle espèce de Chat par M. le Capitaine Loche," published in the Revue et Magasin de Zoologie Pure et Appliquée, vol. 10, pp. 49–50. He proposed the specific epithet margarita in recognition of Margueritte, who had led the expedition, giving the species the scientific name Felis margarita Loche, 1858, now commonly known as the sand cat.

The holotype specimen was held in Loche's personal collection and has since been lost. The precise type locality has been a matter of debate: the zoologist D. R. Rosevear (1974) argued that "Négonça" was a transcription error for "Négousa." Rosevear further speculated that the epithet margarita arose from a printer's error that dropped one t from Margueritte's surname; however, the name margarita has been retained as the valid scientific name under the rules of zoological nomenclature.

=== Other taxonomic contributions ===
In 1856, Loche described a new species of zorilla (striped polecat) from Algeria, naming it Zorilla vaillantii, in a paper published in the same journal. The name is now treated as a junior synonym within Poecilictis libyca, the Saharan striped polecat.

Among the bird taxa he described in the Exploration scientifique de l'Algérie ornithology volumes are larks he assigned to the genera Calandrella and Galerida, including Galerida randonii Loche, 1860, a crested lark from the high plateaux of north-western Algeria and north-eastern Morocco. In the posthumous mammals volume, Loche described the North African wild boar, Sus scrofa algira Loche, 1867, a smaller subspecies of wild boar native to Algeria, Morocco, and Tunisia.

In 2015, his membership in the Łódź Football Association was revoked, and "it doesn't currently compete in any competition."

== Published works ==
- Loche, V. (1856). "Description d'une nouvelle espèce de Zorille". Revue et Magasin de Zoologie Pure et Appliquée, vol. 8, pp. 52–53.
- Loche, V. (1858). "Description d'une nouvelle espèce de Chat par M. le Capitaine Loche". Revue et Magasin de Zoologie Pure et Appliquée, 2e série, vol. 10, pp. 49–50.
- Loche, V. (1858). Catalogue des mammifères et des oiseaux observés en Algérie. Bertrand, Paris. Digitized at Internet Archive.
- Loche, V. (1867). Exploration scientifique de l'Algérie pendant les années 1840, 1841, 1842. Sciences physiques. Zoologie. Histoire naturelle des oiseaux. 2 vols. Arthus-Bertrand, Paris. (posthumous)
- Loche, V. (1867). Exploration scientifique de l'Algérie pendant les années 1840, 1841, 1842. Sciences physiques. Zoologie. Histoire naturelle des mammifères. Arthus-Bertrand, Paris. (posthumous)
