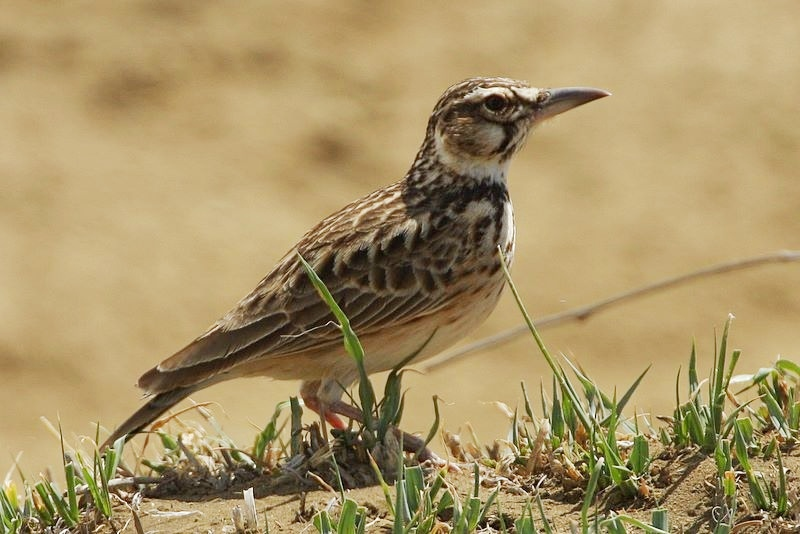
- P. f. delamerei in Serengeti N.P.

Conservation status
- Least Concern (IUCN 3.1)

Scientific classification
- Kingdom: Animalia
- Phylum: Chordata
- Class: Aves
- Order: Passeriformes
- Family: Alaudidae
- Genus: Spizocorys
- Species: S. fremantlii

Binomial name
- Spizocorys fremantlii (Lort Phillips, 1897)

Subspecies
- See text
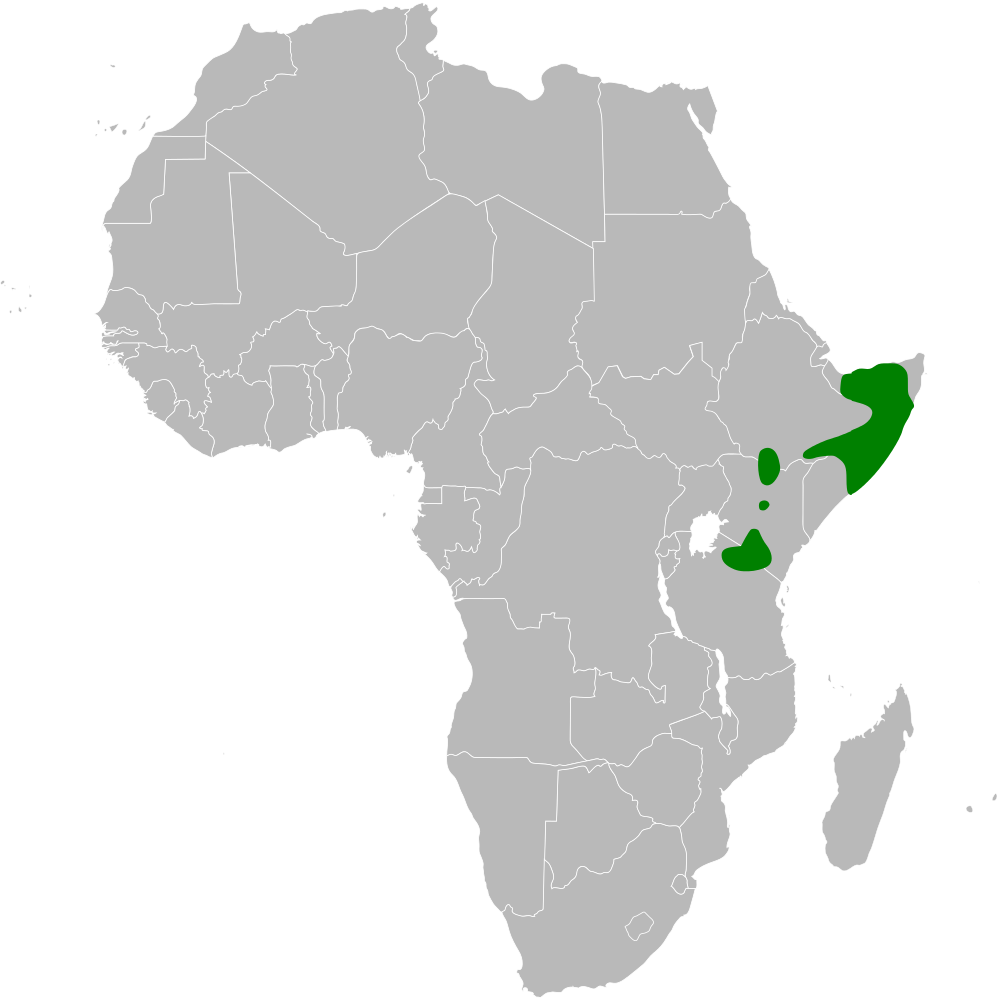
- resident range

Synonyms
- Calendula fremantlii; Galerida fremantlii; Pseudalaemon fremantlii

= Short-tailed lark =

Species of bird

The short-tailed lark (Spizocorys fremantlii) is a species of lark in the family Alaudidae.

It is found in Ethiopia, Kenya, Somalia, and Tanzania. Its natural habitats are dry savannah, subtropical or tropical dry shrubland, and subtropical or tropical dry lowland grassland.

== Taxonomy and systematics ==
The short-tailed lark was originally placed in the genus Calendula (which was subsequently renamed to Galerida) and then to the monotypic genus Pseudalaemon before it was re-classified to Spizocorys in 2014.

=== Subspecies ===
Three subspecies are recognized:

- Somali short-tailed lark (S. f. fremantlii) - (Lort Phillips, 1897): Found in south-eastern Ethiopia and Somalia
- S. f. megaensis - (Benson, 1946): Found in southern Ethiopia and northern Kenya
- Kenya short-tailed lark (S. f. delamerei) - (Sharpe, 1900): Originally described as a separate species. Found in southern Kenya and northern Tanzania

== Behaviour and ecology ==
=== Food and feeding ===
The diet of the short-tailed lark consists mostly of vegetable material.

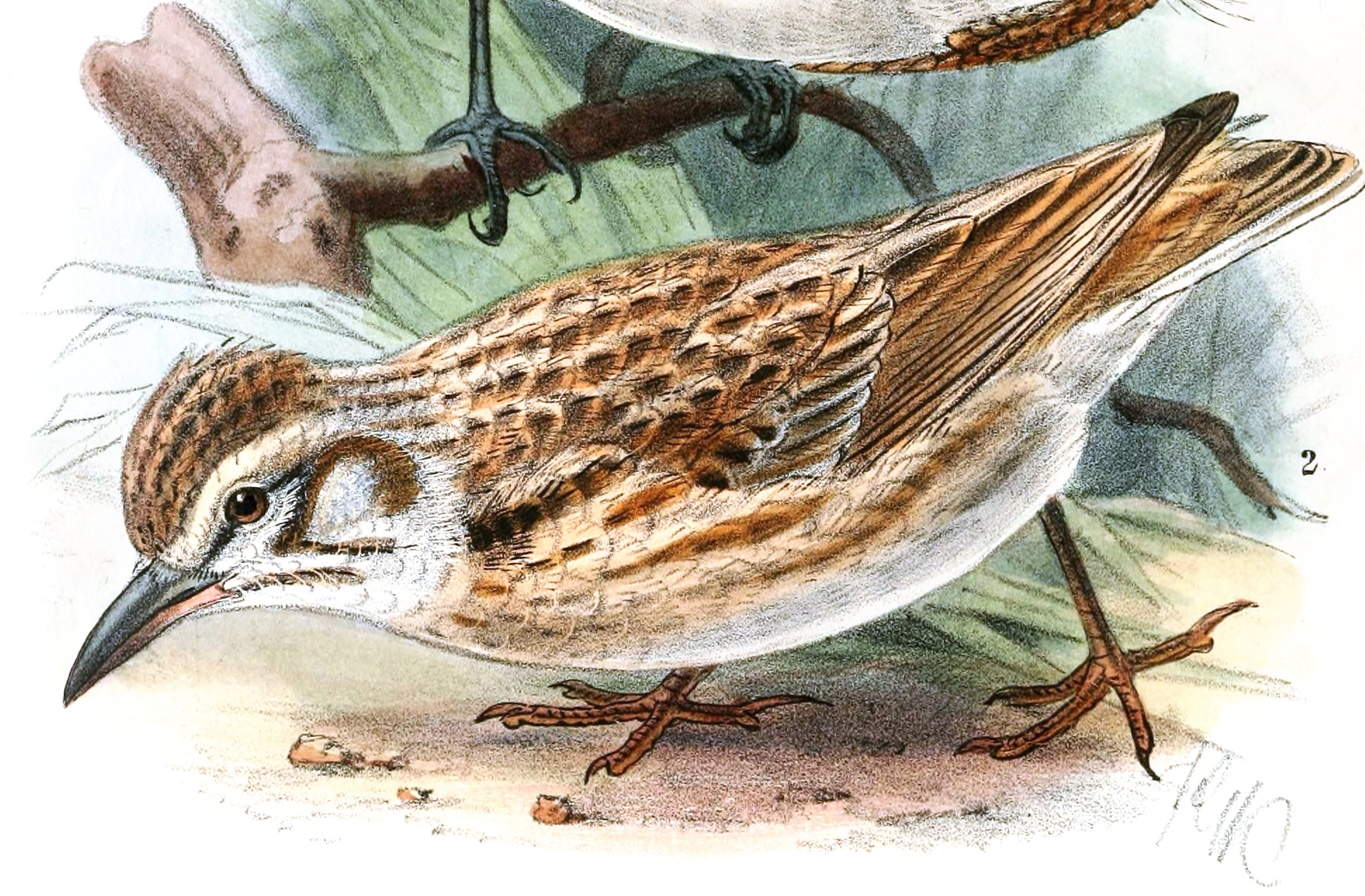
Illustrated by Keulemans
