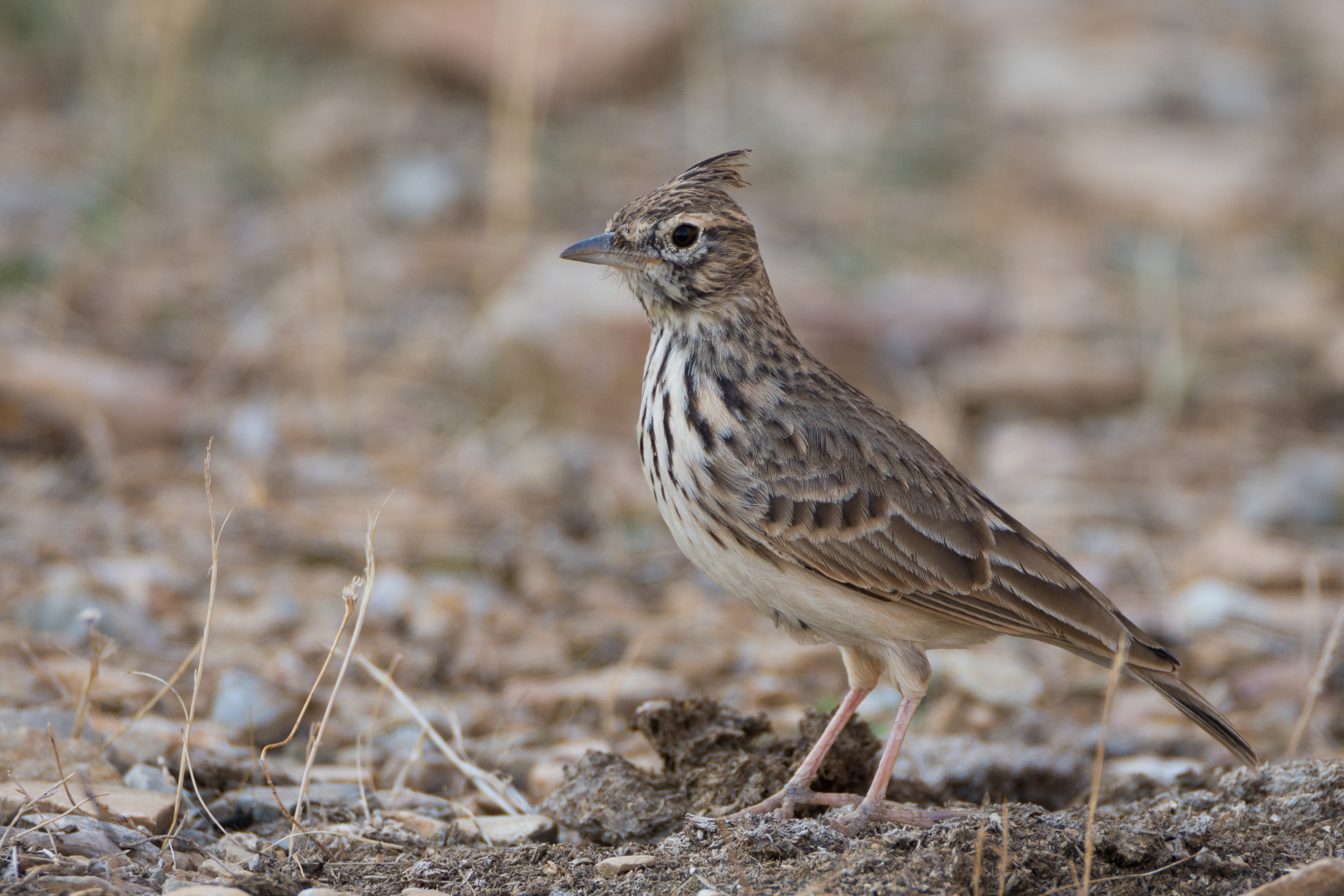

Conservation status
- Least Concern (IUCN 3.1)

Scientific classification
- Kingdom: Animalia
- Phylum: Chordata
- Class: Aves
- Order: Passeriformes
- Family: Alaudidae
- Genus: Galerida
- Species: G. theklae

Binomial name
- Galerida theklae Brehm, AE, 1857

Subspecies
- See text
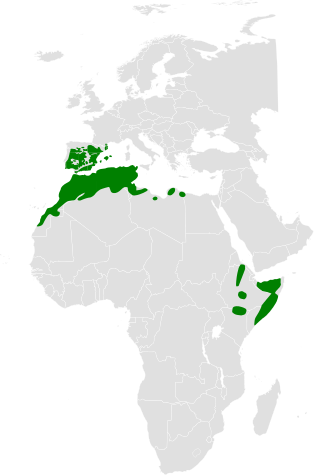

Synonyms
- Galerita Theklae; Galerida malabarica theklae

= Thekla's lark =

Species of bird

Thekla's lark (Galerida theklae), also known as the Thekla lark, is a species of lark that breeds on the Iberian Peninsula and in North and East Africa south to Kenya. It is a sedentary (non-migratory) species. This is a common bird of dry open country, often at some altitude. Thekla's lark was named by Alfred Edmund Brehm in 1857 for his recently deceased sister Thekla Brehm (1833–1857). The name is a modern Greek one, Θέκλα (Thekla), which comes from ancient Greek Θεόκλεια (Theokleia) derived from θεός (theos, "god") and κλέος (kleos, "glory" or "honour"). The population is declining in parts of Spain, but this is a common bird with a very wide range and the International Union for Conservation of Nature has rated its conservation status as being of "least concern".

== Taxonomy and systematics ==
Thekla's lark has several East African subspecies that show deep genetic divergence both among themselves and from the Mediterranean populations and are consequently strong candidates for consideration as separate species. Formerly, some authorities considered Thekla's lark and the Malabar lark to be conspecific. Alternate names for Thekla's lark include short-crested lark and Thekla crested-lark.

=== Subspecies ===
Twelve subspecies are recognized:

- G. t. theklae - Brehm, AE, 1857: Also known as Iberian Thekla's lark. Found in Portugal, Spain, Balearic Islands and extreme southern France
- North Moroccan Thekla's lark (G. t. erlangeri) - Hartert, 1904: Found in northern Morocco
- Central Moroccan Thekla's lark (G. t. ruficolor) - Whitaker, 1898: Found in central and north-eastern Morocco, northern Algeria and northern Tunisia
- G. t. theresae - Meinertzhagen, R, 1939: Found in south-western Morocco and Mauritania
- Hauts Plateaux Thekla's lark (G. t. superflua) - Hartert, 1897: Found in eastern Morocco, northern Algeria and eastern Tunisia
- North African Thekla's lark (G. t. carolinae) - Erlanger, 1897: Found in eastern Morocco through the northern Sahara to north-western Egypt
- G. t. harrarensis - Érard & Jarry, 1973: Found in eastern Ethiopia
- G. t. huei - Érard & Naurois, 1973: Found in south-central Ethiopia
- Abyssinian Thekla's lark (G. t. praetermissa) - (Blanford, 1869): Found in southern Eritrea to central Ethiopia
- Somali Thekla's lark (G. t. ellioti) - Hartert, 1897: Originally described as a separate species. Found in northern and central Somalia
- G. t. mallablensis - Colston, 1982: Found in southern Somalia
- G. t. huriensis - Benson, 1947: Found in southern Ethiopia and northern Kenya
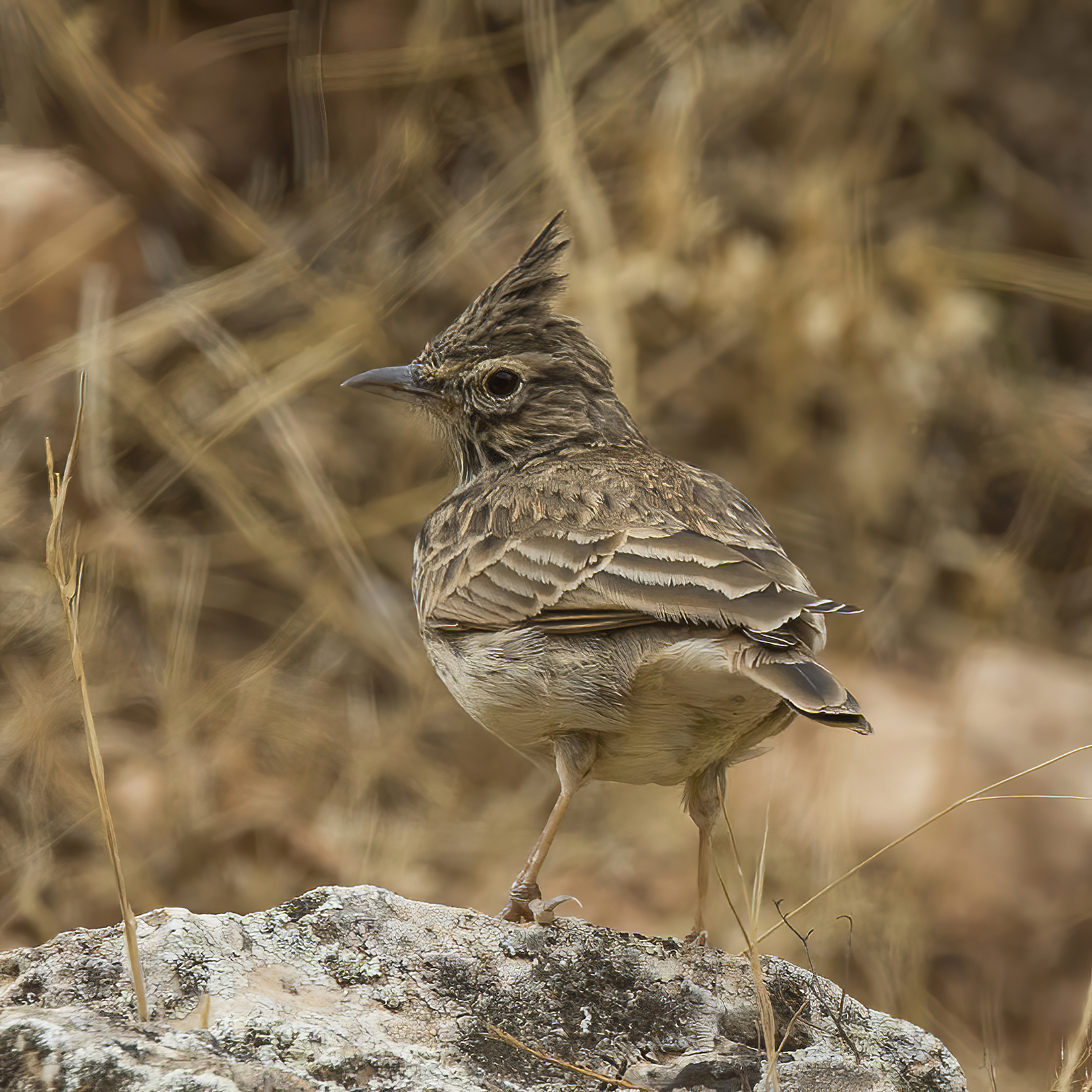
G. t. theklae
in hills near Loja, Granada, Spain

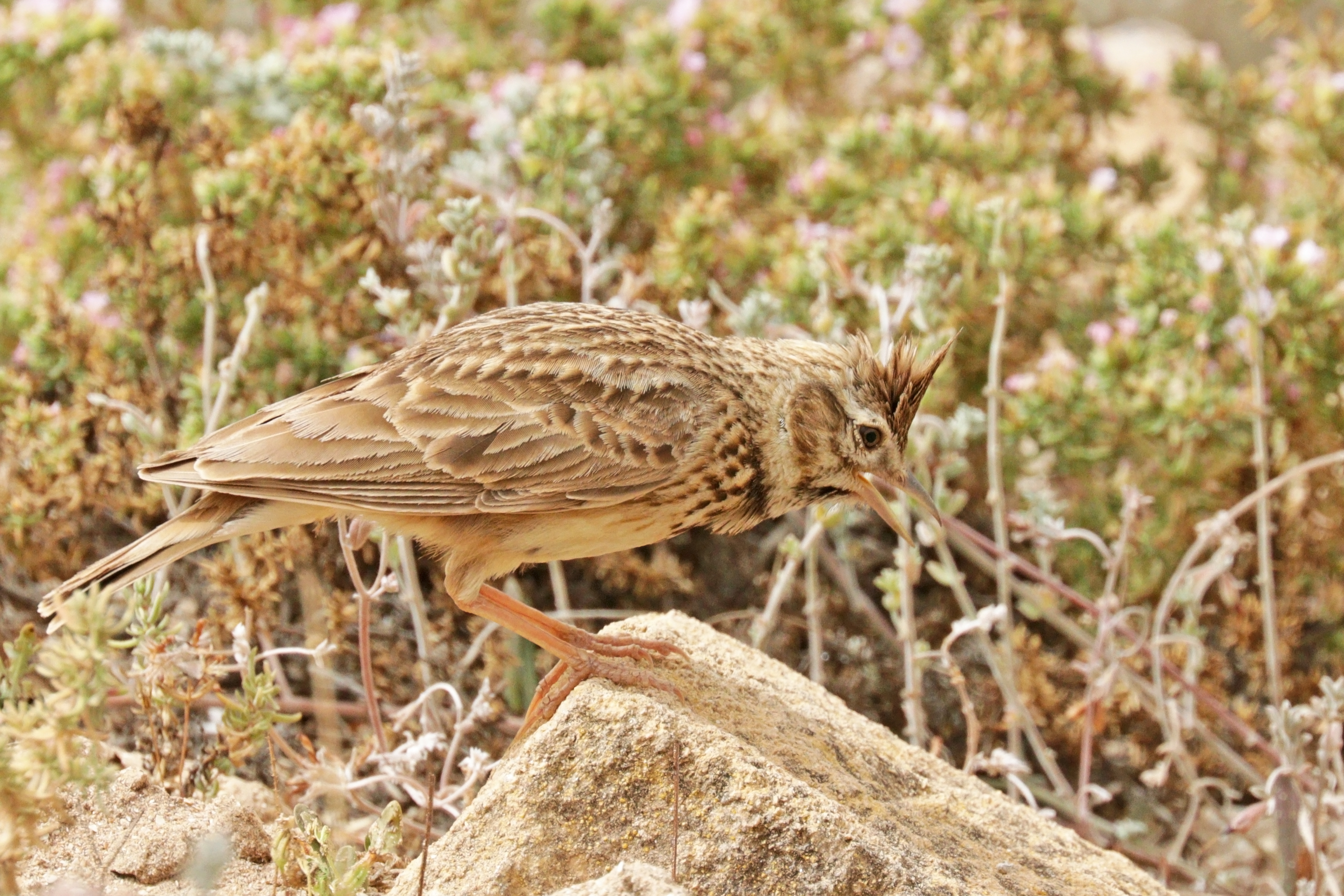
G. t. ruficolor
Souss-Massa National Park, Morocco

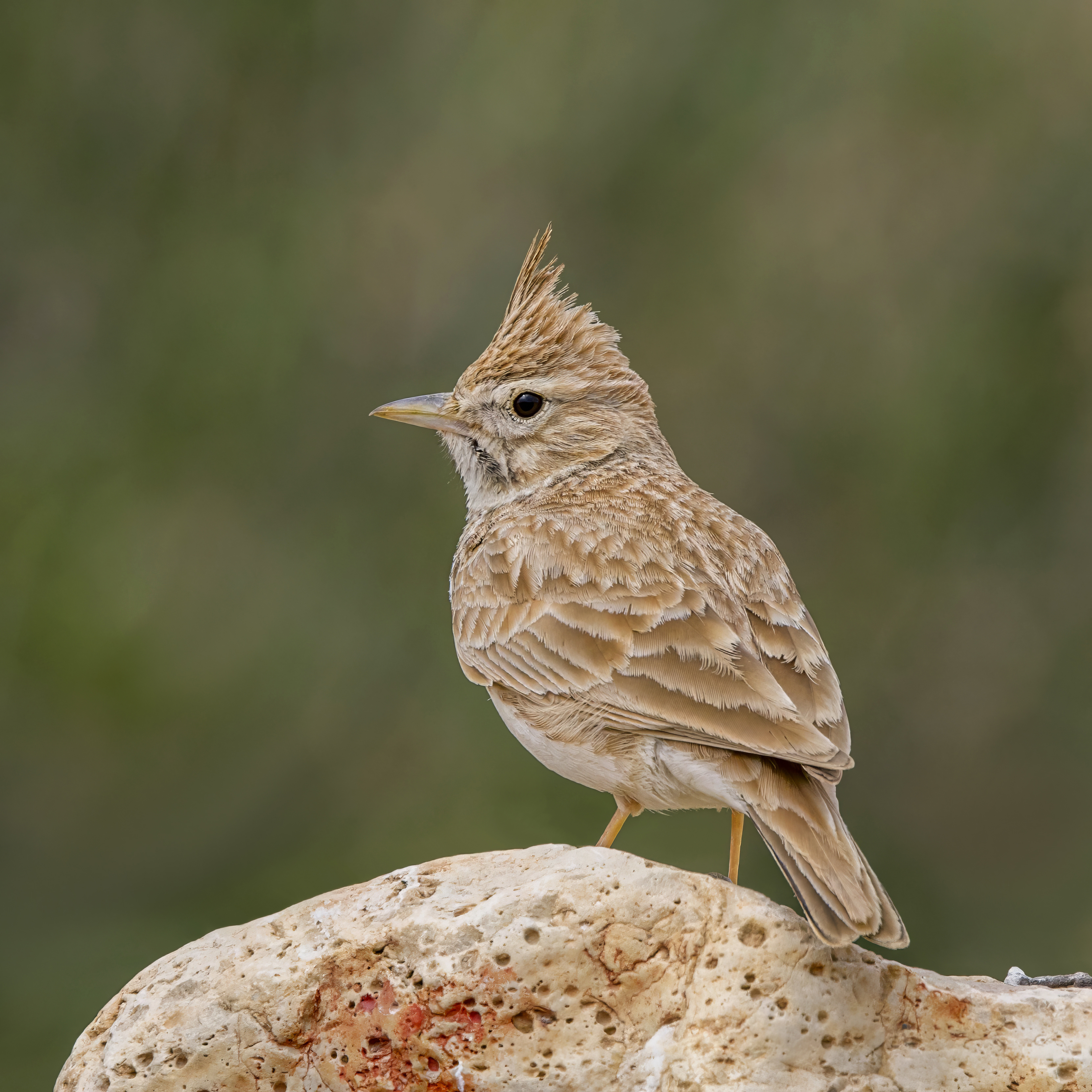
G. t. carolinae
in the desert South East of Douz, Tunisia

== Description ==
This is a smallish lark, slightly smaller than the Eurasian skylark. It has a long, spiky, erectile crest. Its colouring is similar to the widespread crested lark (G. cristata), being predominantly brownish-grey or brown, although its back and rump are greyer than that species. Its breast is streaked with black. It is smaller and somewhat greyer than the crested lark, and has a shorter bill. In flight, it shows grey underwings, whereas the crested lark has reddish underwings. It is also greyer than the Eurasian skylark, and lacks the white wing and tail edge of that species. The body is mainly dark-streaked grey above and whitish below. The sexes are similar.

== Distribution and habitat ==
Thekla's lark is native and resident in France, Spain, Portugal, Algeria, Egypt, Eritrea, Ethiopia, Kenya, Libya, Morocco, Somalia, Tunisia and Western Sahara. Its typical habitat is rugged areas with scrub, bare patches of ground and semi-arid grassland.

== Behaviour and ecology ==
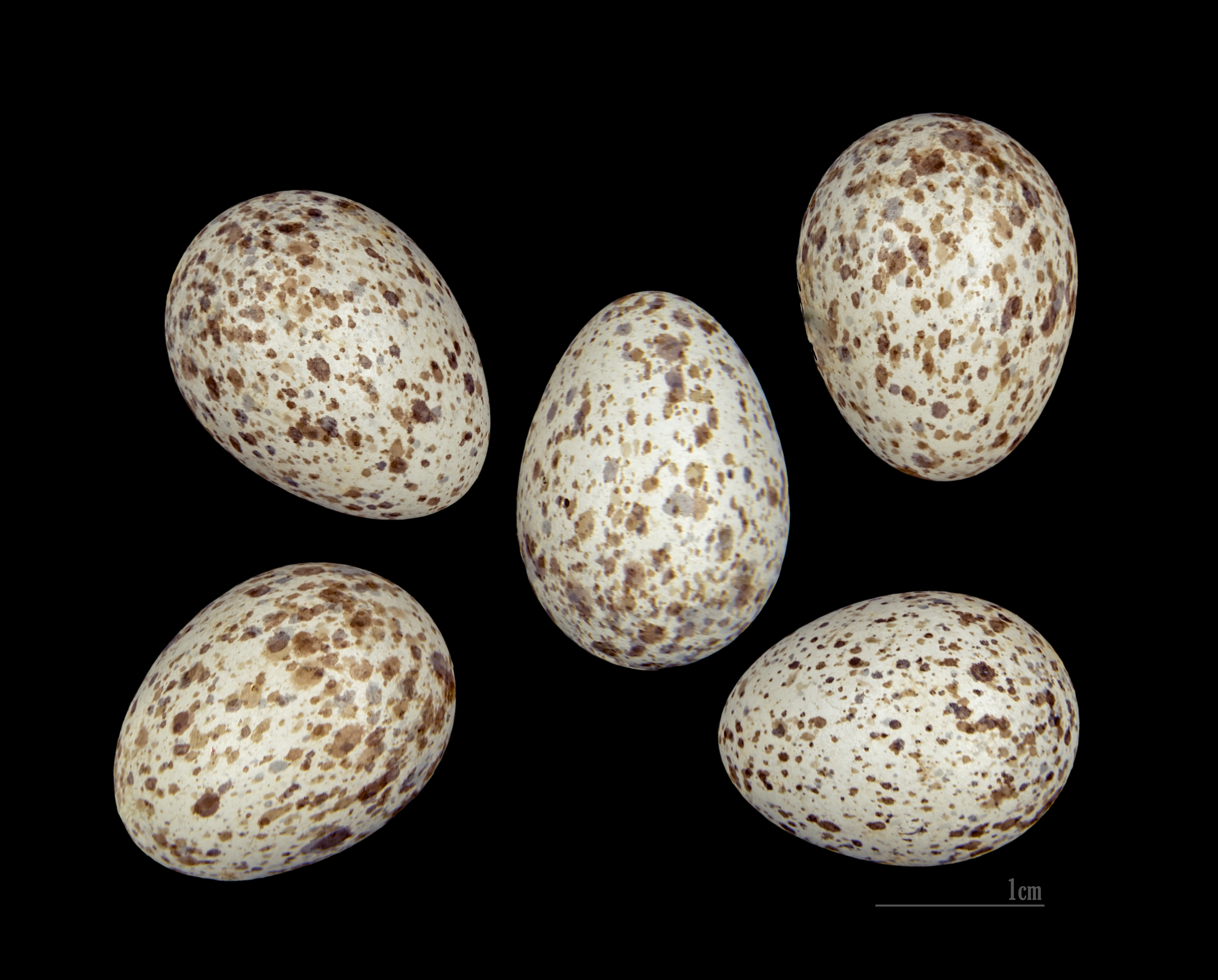
Eggs of Galerida theklae MHNT

It nests on the ground, laying two to six eggs. Its food is weed, seeds and insects, the last being especially popular in the breeding season.

The song is melodious and varied, with mournful whistles and mimicry included. It is softer and more tuneful than that of the crested lark, and may be sung during flight or from the ground or an exposed perch.
