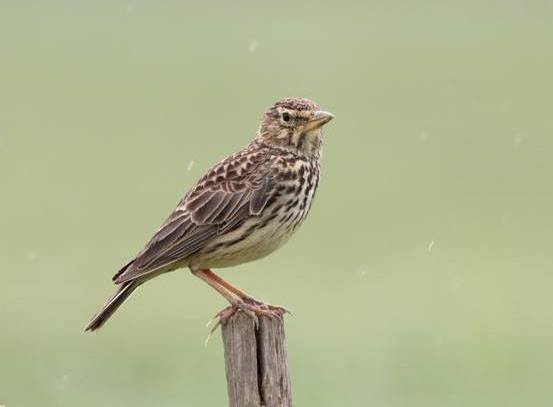
- Nominate race at De Hoop Nature Reserve, South Africa

Conservation status
- Least Concern (IUCN 3.1)

Scientific classification
- Kingdom: Animalia
- Phylum: Chordata
- Class: Aves
- Order: Passeriformes
- Family: Alaudidae
- Genus: Galerida
- Species: G. magnirostris

Binomial name
- Galerida magnirostris (Stephens, 1826)

Subspecies
- See text
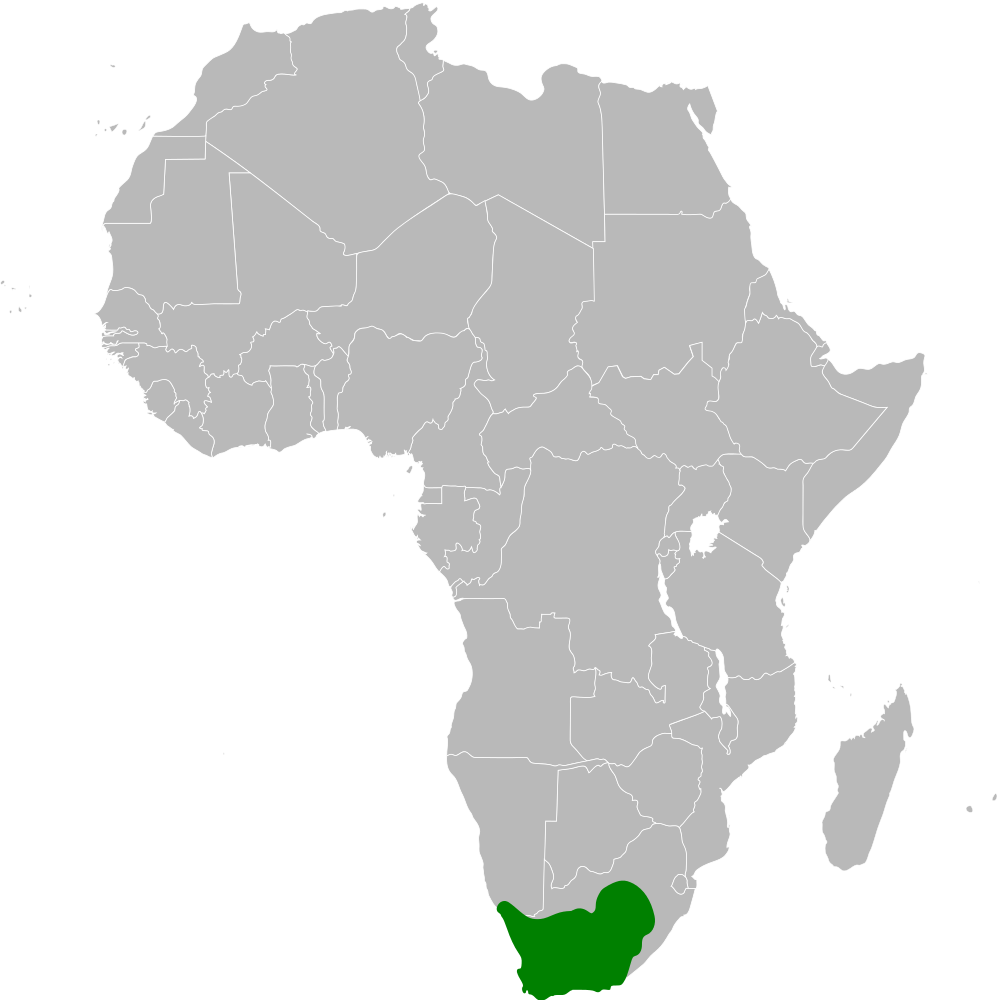
- resident range

Synonyms
- Alauda magnirostris; Calendula magnirostris; Galerida crassirostris

= Large-billed lark =

Species of bird

The large-billed lark or southern thick-billed lark (Galerida magnirostris) is a small passerine bird found in southern Africa. The name "large-billed lark" may also refer to Bradfield's lark. The name "thick-billed lark" more commonly refers to the species of the same name (i.e. Rhamphocoris clotbey).

== Taxonomy and systematics ==
The large-billed lark was originally placed in the genus Alauda, and then Calendula until that genus was subsequently re-named to the present Galerida. Another alternate name used for the large-billed lark is the long-billed lark.

=== Subspecies ===
Three subspecies are recognized:

- G. m. magnirostris (Stephens, 1826): Found in south-western South Africa
- G. m. sedentaria Clancey, 1993: Found in south-western Namibia and western South Africa
- Orange Free State large-billed lark, G. m. harei (Roberts, 1924): Found in central South Africa, Lesotho

== Description ==
The large-billed lark is 18 cm in length. It is relatively short-tailed and has a thick bill with a yellow base to the lower mandible. It has streaked brown-grey upperparts, and a long white supercilium. Like other species in the genus, it has a crest that can be raised in display or alarm. The underparts are cream-coloured with heavy dark streaking on the breast. The heavy bi-coloured bill distinguishes this species from all other African larks.

The call of this very vocal species is a soft creaking "treeeeleeeeleee".

== Distribution and habitat ==
The large-billed lark is a resident breeder in southern South Africa, Lesotho and southernmost Namibia. Its natural habitat is fynbos, karoo scrub and mountain grassland. The large-billed lark is also found in cultivated and fallow agricultural land.

== Behaviour and ecology ==
Like other larks, the large-billed lark nests on the ground. Its food is seeds and insects, the latter especially in the breeding season.
