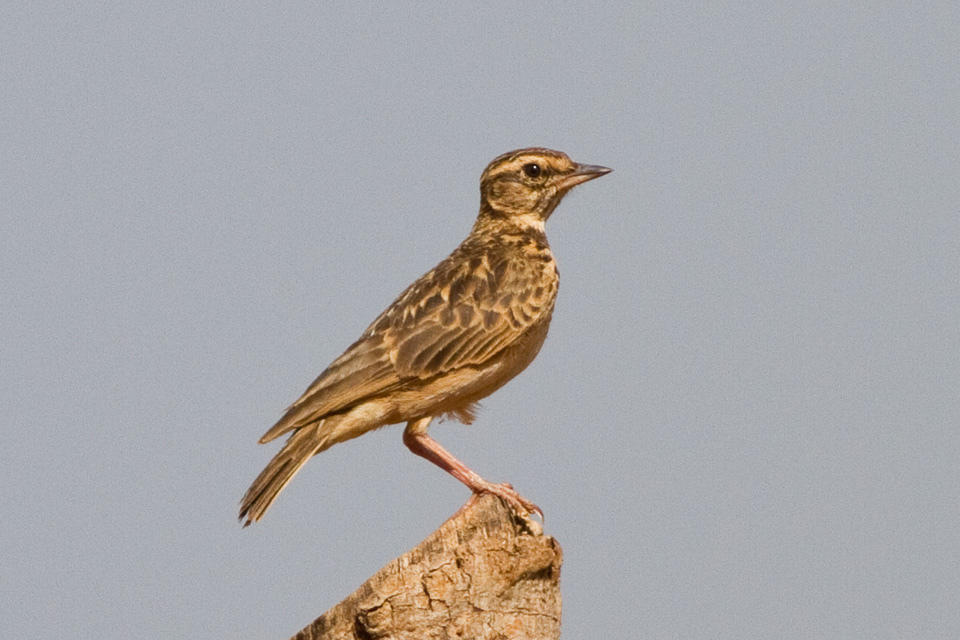

Conservation status
- Least Concern (IUCN 3.1)

Scientific classification
- Kingdom: Animalia
- Phylum: Chordata
- Class: Aves
- Order: Passeriformes
- Family: Alaudidae
- Genus: Galerida
- Species: G. modesta

Binomial name
- Galerida modesta Heuglin, 1864

Subspecies
- See text
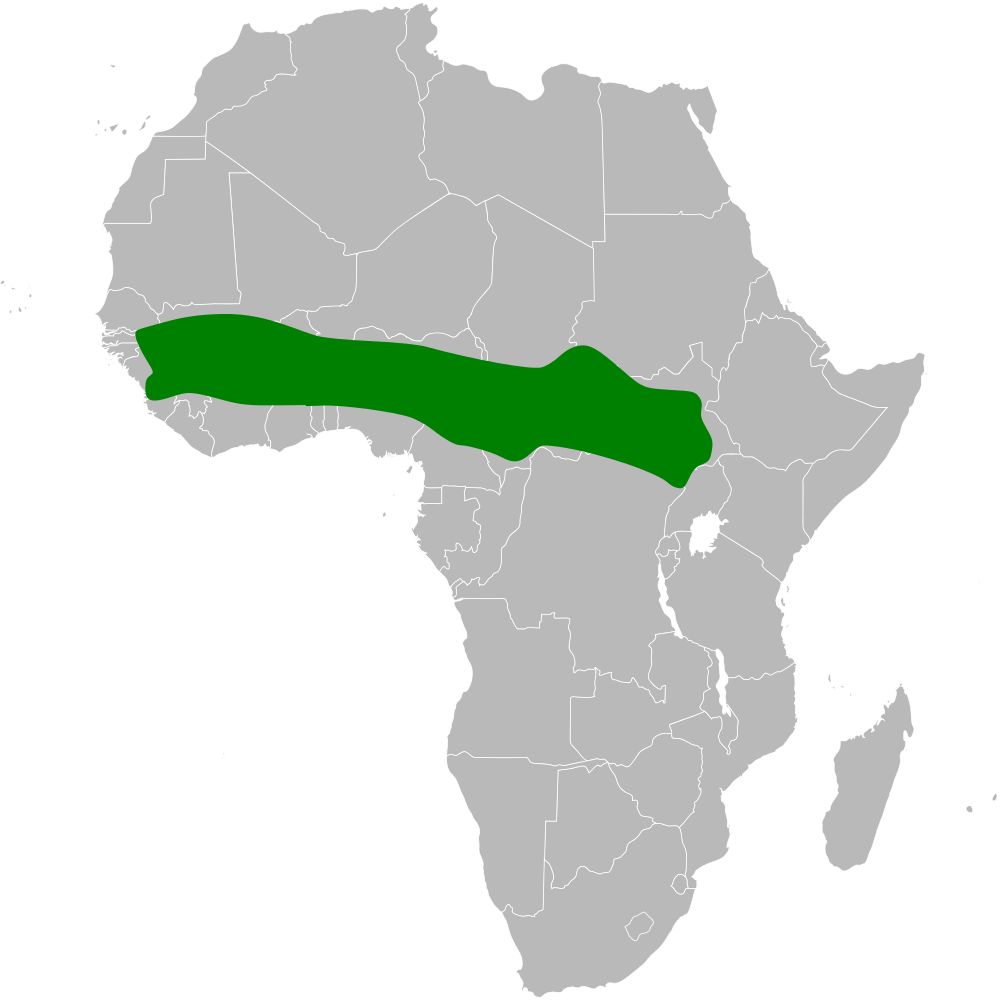

Synonyms
- Heliocorys modesta

= Sun lark =

Species of bird

The sun lark (Galerida modesta) or Nigerian sun lark, is a species of lark in the family Alaudidae. Its range extends mainly across the Sudan region (south of the Sahel), from Guinea to South Sudan. Its natural habitats are dry savannah and subtropical or tropical dry lowland grassland.

== Taxonomy and systematics ==
=== Subspecies ===
Four subspecies are recognized:

- G. m. modesta - Heuglin, 1864: Found from Burkina Faso and northern Ghana east to southern Sudan
- Fouta-Djallon sun lark (G. m. nigrita) - (Grote, 1920): Found in Senegal, Gambia, Guinea, Sierra Leone and southern Mali
- Ngaundere sun lark (G. m. struempelli, also as G. m. saturata, G. m. strumpelli and G. m. strümpelli) - (Reichenow, 1910): Originally classified as a separate species in genus Mirafra. Found in Cameroon
- Uele sun lark (G. m. bucolica) - (Hartlaub, 1887): Originally classified as a separate species in genus Mirafra. Found in south-eastern Central African Republic, north-eastern Democratic Republic of Congo and extreme north-western Uganda
