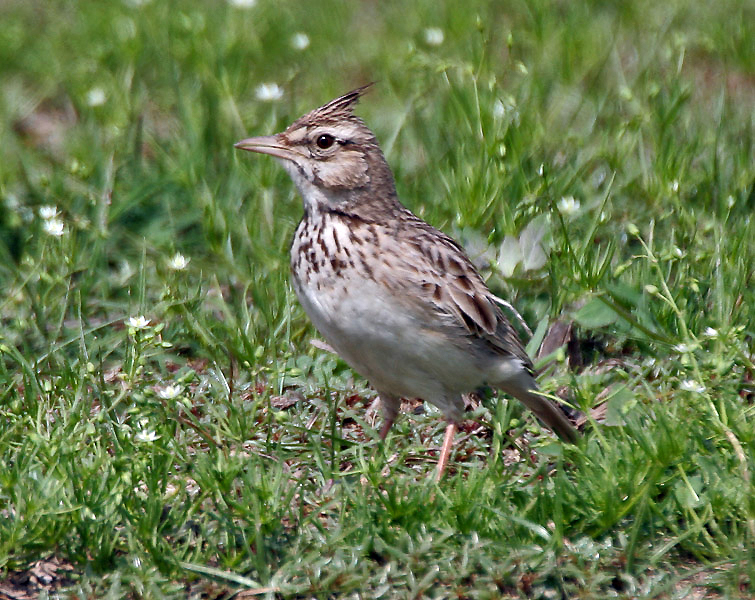
- Crested lark (Galerida cristata)

Scientific classification
- Kingdom: Animalia
- Phylum: Chordata
- Class: Aves
- Order: Passeriformes
- Family: Alaudidae
- Genus: Galerida; F. Boie, 1828

Type species
- Alauda cristata Linnaeus, 1758

Species
- See text

Synonyms
- Calendula; Galerita; Heliocorys; Ptilocorys

= Galerida =

Genus of birds

Galerida is a genus of birds in the family Alaudidae. The current scientific name is derived from Latin. Galerida was the name for a lark with a crest, from galerum, "cap". The name Galerida is synonymous with the earlier genus names Calendula, Heliocorys and Ptilocorys.

== Taxonomy and systematics ==
The genus Galerida was established by the German zoologist Friedrich Boie in 1828. The type species was subsequently designated as the crested lark.

=== Extant species ===
The genus contains six species:

Image	Scientific name	Common name	Distribution
	Galerida deva	Sykes's lark	central India
	Galerida modesta	Sun lark	Guinea to South Sudan
	Galerida magnirostris	Large-billed lark	southern Africa
	Galerida theklae	Thekla lark	Iberian Peninsula, in northern Africa, and sub-Saharan Africa from Senegal to Somalia
	Galerida cristata	Crested lark	northern Africa and in parts of western Asia and China
	Galerida malabarica	Malabar lark	western India.

=== Extinct species ===
There are at least two fossil species which are included in this genus:

- †Galerida bulgarica (late Pliocene of Varshets, Bulgaria)
- †Galerida pannonica (Pliocene of Csarnota, Hungary)

=== Former species ===
Formerly, some authorities also considered the following species (or subspecies) as species within the genus Galerida:

- Short-tailed lark (as Galerida fremantlii)
- Dunn's lark (as Calendula dunni)
