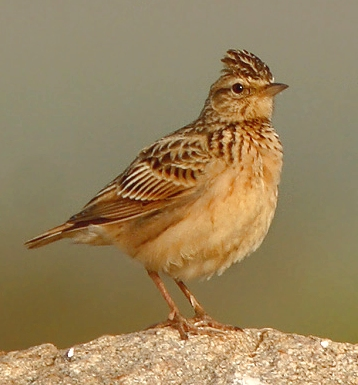

Conservation status
- Least Concern (IUCN 3.1)

Scientific classification
- Kingdom: Animalia
- Phylum: Chordata
- Class: Aves
- Order: Passeriformes
- Family: Alaudidae
- Genus: Galerida
- Species: G. deva

Binomial name
- Galerida deva (Sykes, 1832)
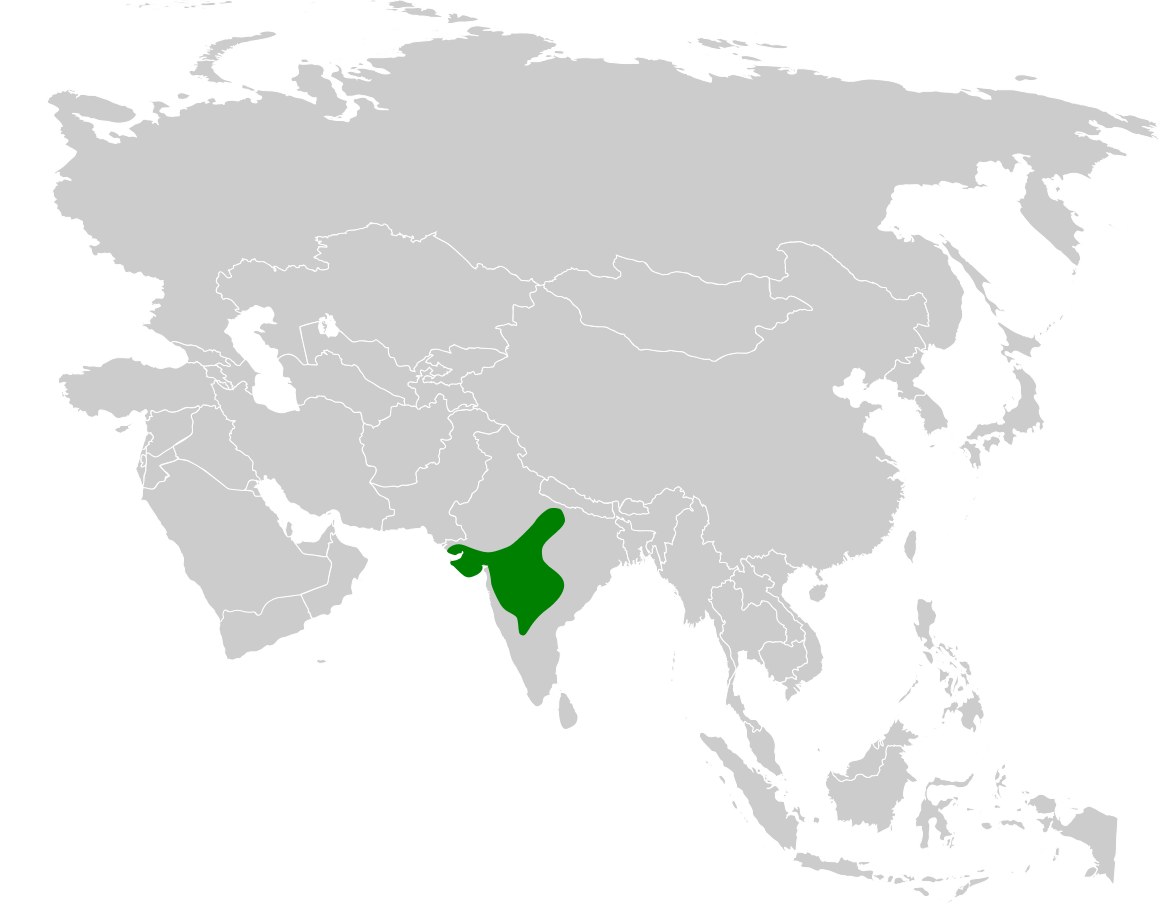

Synonyms
- Alauda Deva

= Sykes's lark =

Species of bird

Sykes's lark (Galerida deva) is a species of lark found in the dry open country of India. Its distribution is mainly restricted to central India, although stray records have been found elsewhere on the sub-continent. It is identified by its prominent crest and its overall rufous colouration. It has streaks on its breast which are less prominent than those found in the Oriental skylark.

It can imitate the calls of 34 other birds within its habitat.

== Taxonomy and systematics ==
Originally, Sykes's lark was classified as belonging to the genus Alauda. Alternate names for Sykes's skylark include Deccan crested lark, Deccan lark, Sykes's crested-lark, tawny crested lark and tawny lark.

== Diet ==
It is an insectivore.

== Gallery ==
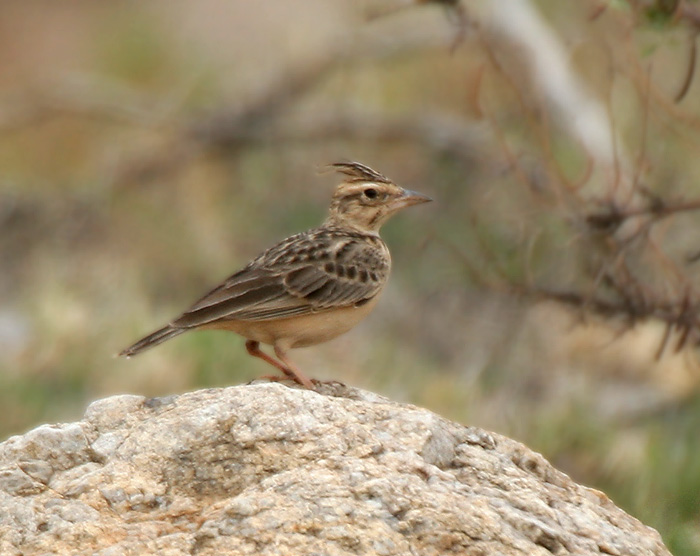
In Hyderabad, India

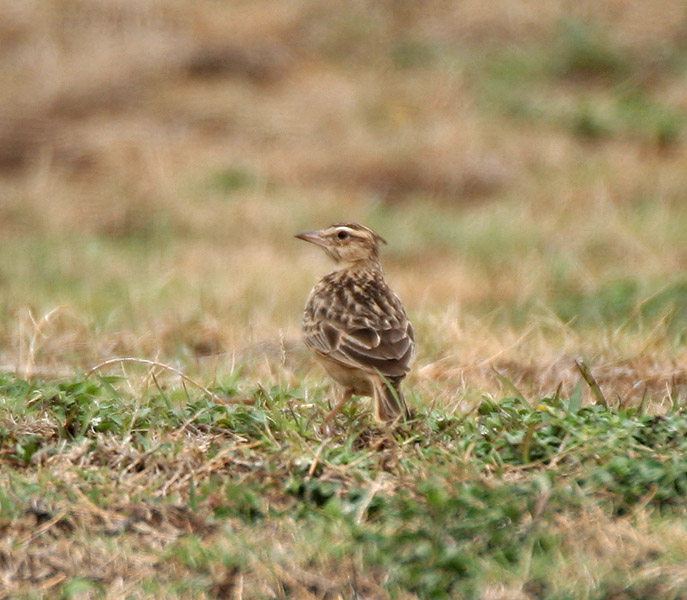
In Hyderabad, India

Media related to Galerida deva at Wikimedia Commons Data related to Galerida deva at Wikispecies
