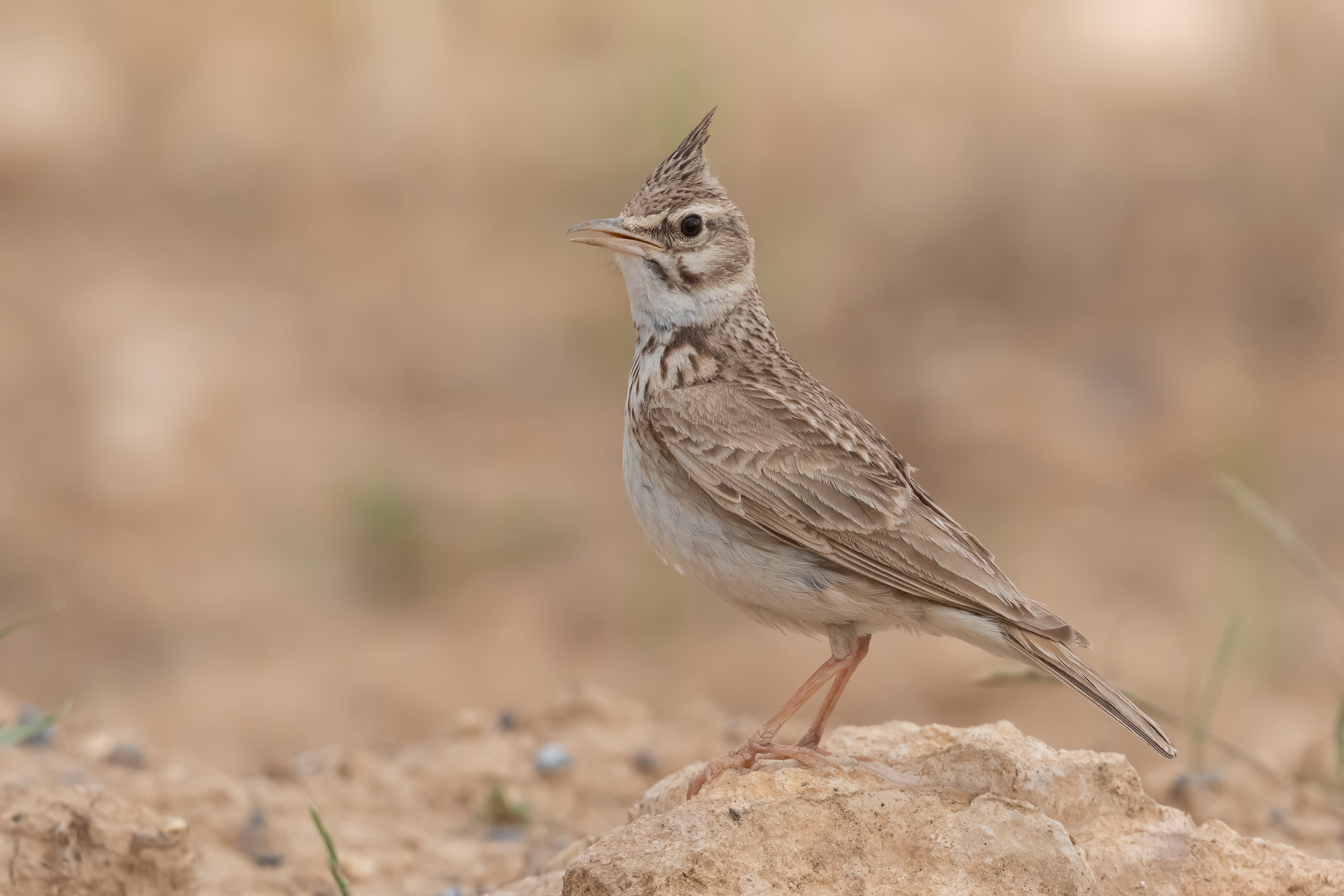
- At Zaghouan, Tunisia

Conservation status
- Least Concern (IUCN 3.1)

Scientific classification
- Kingdom: Animalia
- Phylum: Chordata
- Class: Aves
- Order: Passeriformes
- Family: Alaudidae
- Genus: Galerida
- Species: G. cristata

Binomial name
- Galerida cristata (Linnaeus, 1758)

Subspecies
- See text
- Approximate range of G. cristata Breeding Resident

Synonyms
- Alauda cristata Linnaeus, 1758

= Crested lark =

Species of bird

The crested lark (Galerida cristata) is a species of lark widespread across Eurasia and northern Africa. It is a non-migratory bird, but can occasionally be found as a vagrant in Great Britain.

Crested Lark in South Hebron

== Taxonomy and systematics ==
The crested lark was one of the many species originally described by Carl Linnaeus in his landmark 1758 10th edition of Systema Naturae. It was classified in the genus Alauda until German naturalist Friedrich Boie placed it in the new genus Galerida in 1821. Colin Harrison recommended lumping members of Galerida and Lullula back into Alauda in 1865 due to a lack of defining characteristics. The current scientific name is derived from Latin. Galerida was the name for a lark with a crest, from galerum, "cap", and cristata means "crested". Alban Guillaumet and colleagues noted the distinctiveness of populations from the Maghreb—birds in the dryer parts of Morocco and Tunisia had longer bills while those in more coastal northern parts had shorter bills typical of the European subspecies. The authors sampled the mitochondrial DNA and found they were distinct genetically.

=== Subspecies ===
Thirty-five subspecies are recognized:

- G. c. pallida Brehm, CL, 1858 – Iberian Peninsula
- G. c. cristata (Linnaeus, C, 1758) – central Europe to Slovenia, Belarus, northern Hungary, and northern Ukraine
- G. c. neumanni Hilgert, C, 1907 – Italy (Toscana southward to Rome area)
- G. c. apuliae Jordans, A, 1935 – southern peninsular Italy and Sicily
- G. c. meridionalis Brehm, CL, 1841 – southwestern and southern Balkans, Ionian Islands (western Greece), Crete, and western Anatolian Türkiye
- G. c. cypriaca Bianchi, VL, 1907 – Kárpathos, Rhodes, and Cyprus
- G. c. tenuirostris Brehm, CL, 1858 – eastern Hungary and Romania to southern Russia and western Kazakhstan
- G. c. caucasica Taczanowski, W, 1888 – eastern Aegean Islands, northern Turkey, southern Caucasus, and western Transcaucasia
- G. c. kleinschmidti Erlanger, C, 1899 – northwestern Morocco (eastward to Rif Mountains and southward to Middle Atlas)
- G. c. riggenbachi Hartert, EJO, 1902 – western Morocco (Casablanca to Sous Valley)
- G. c. randonii Loche, V, 1860 – Hauts Plateaux of eastern Morocco and northwestern Algeria
- G. c. macrorhyncha Tristram, HB, 1859 – southern Morocco and northwestern Algeria south of Atlas Saharien to west-central Mauritania. Maghreb lark
- G. c. carthaginis Kleinschmidt, O & Hilgert, C, 1905 – coastal northeastern Morocco to northern Tunisia (eastward to Sousse)
- G. c. arenicola Tristram, HB, 1859 – northeastern Algerian Sahara to southern Tunisia and northwestern Libya
- G. c. festae Hartert, EJO, 1922 – coastal northeastern Libya (Benghazi to Tobruq)
- G. c. brachyura Tristram, HB, 1865 – northeastern Libya to coastal northern Egypt, northern Sinai, northern Saudi Arabia, and southern Iraq
- G. c. helenae Lavauden, AJL, 1926 – southeastern Algeria and immediately adjacent southwestern Libya
- G. c. jordansi Niethammer, GT, 1955 – northern Niger (Aïr Mountains)
- G. c. nigricans Brehm, CL, 1855 – northern Egypt (Nile Delta)
- G. c. maculata Brehm, CL, 1858 – Egypt (Nile Valley from Cairo to Aswan and El Faiyum)
- G. c. halfae Nicoll, MJ, 1921 – Egypt (Nile Valley south of Aswan) to far northern Sudan (Wadi Halfa)
- G. c. altirostris Brehm, CL, 1855 – eastern Sudan and Eritrea
- G. c. somaliensis Reichenow, A, 1907 – northern Somalia, southern Ethiopia, and northern Kenya
- G. c. balsaci Dekeyser, PL & Villiers, A, 1950 – coastal Mauritania
- G. c. senegallensis (Müller, PLS, 1776) – southern Mauritania, Senegambia, and Guinea-Bissau to Niger
- G. c. alexanderi Neumann, OR, 1908 – northern Nigeria to western Sudan and northeastern Democratic Republic of the Congo
- G. c. isabellina Bonaparte, CLJL, 1850 – central Sudan (Kordofan to Nile Valley)
- G. c. cinnamomina Hartert, EJO, 1904 – western Lebanon (western from Beirut) and northwestern Israel (Mount Carmel and Haifa)
- G. c. zion Meinertzhagen, R, 1920 – southern Turkey, Syria, eastern Lebanon, and eastern Israel (southward to Jerusalem)
- G. c. subtaurica (Kollibay, PR, 1912) – central Turkey to southern Transcaucasia, northwestern Iran, western Turkmenistan, and eastern Iraq
- G. c. magna Hume, AO, 1871 – central Iran and central Turkmenistan eastward to southern Mongolia, northwestern China, and southward to northwestern Pakistan
- G. c. leautungensis (Swinhoe, R, 1861) – Manchuria and northeastern China
- G. c. coreensis Taczanowski, W, 1888 – Korea
- G. c. lynesi Whistler, H, 1928 – northern Kashmir (Gilgit Valley)
- G. c. chendoola (Franklin, J, 1831) – foothills of southern Kashmir to eastern Pakistan, western and northern India, and southern Nepal

The subspecies G. c. macrorhyncha has sometimes been considered as a separate species, the Maghreb lark. The evidence from molecular genetic studies based on mitochondrial DNA sequences is inconsistent as to whether the Maghreb lark should be treated as a separate species.

== Gallery ==
G. c. maculata, ssp. endemic to Egypt

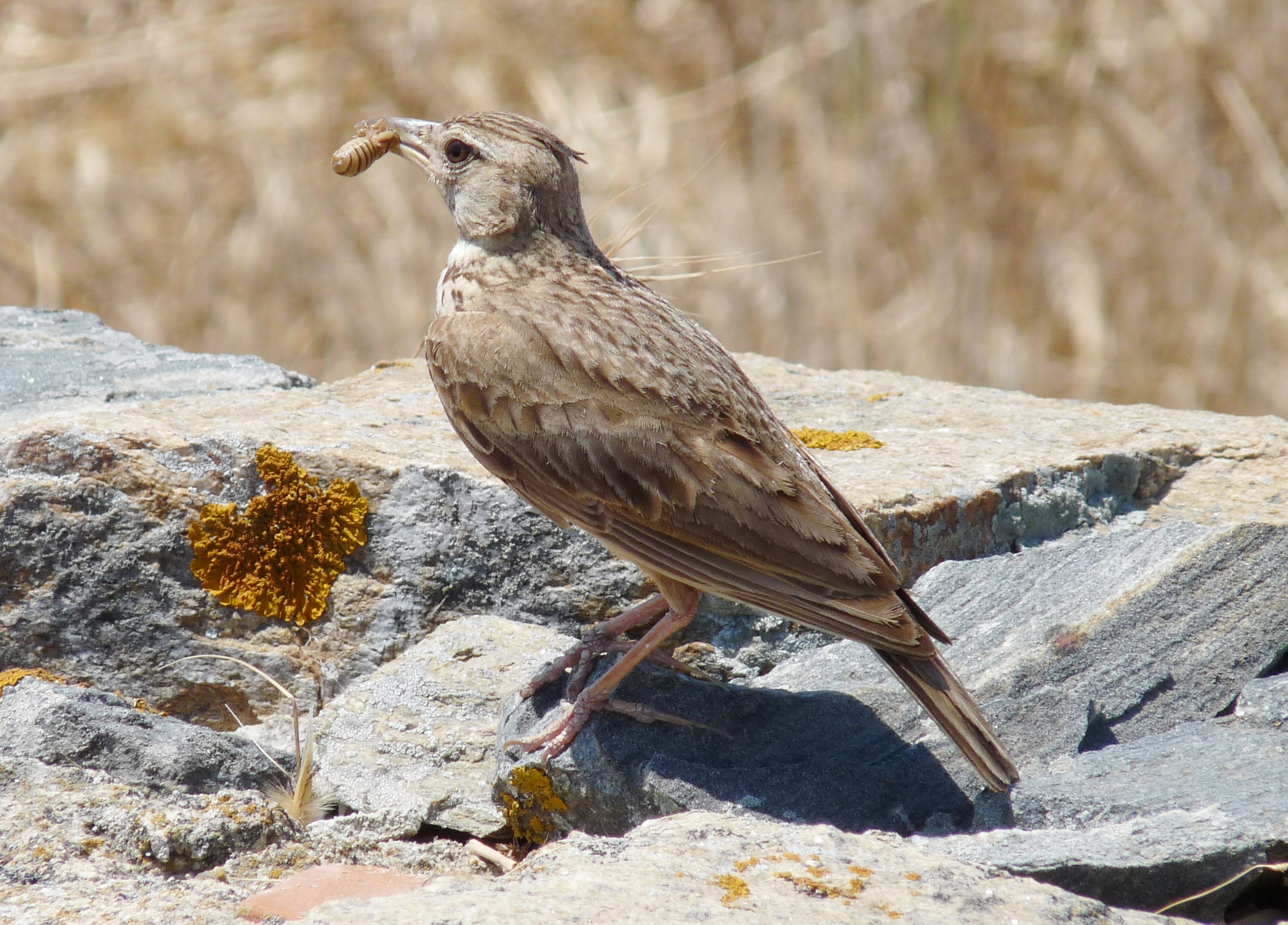
G. c. meridionalis, Delos, Greece

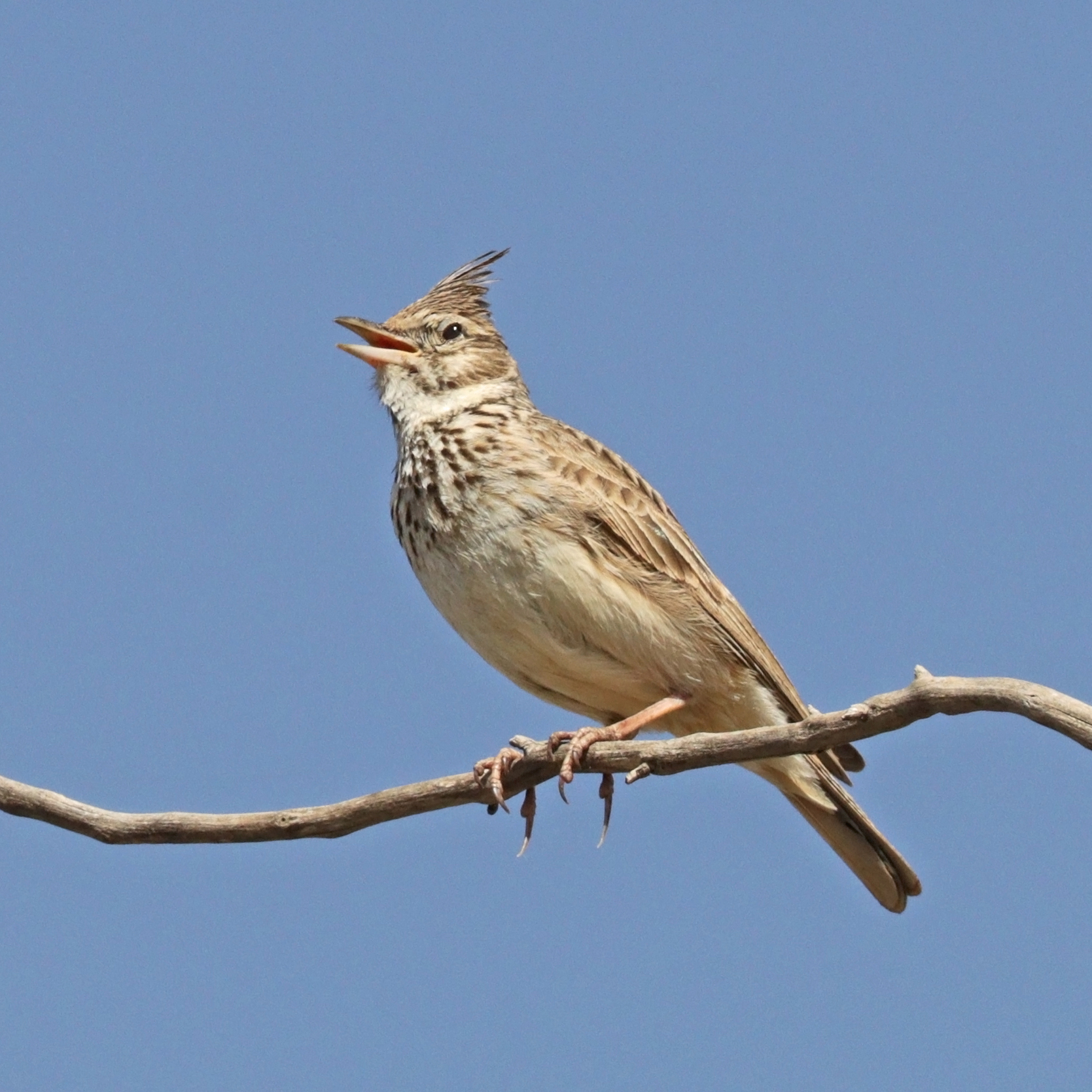
G. c. kleinschmidti, Morocco

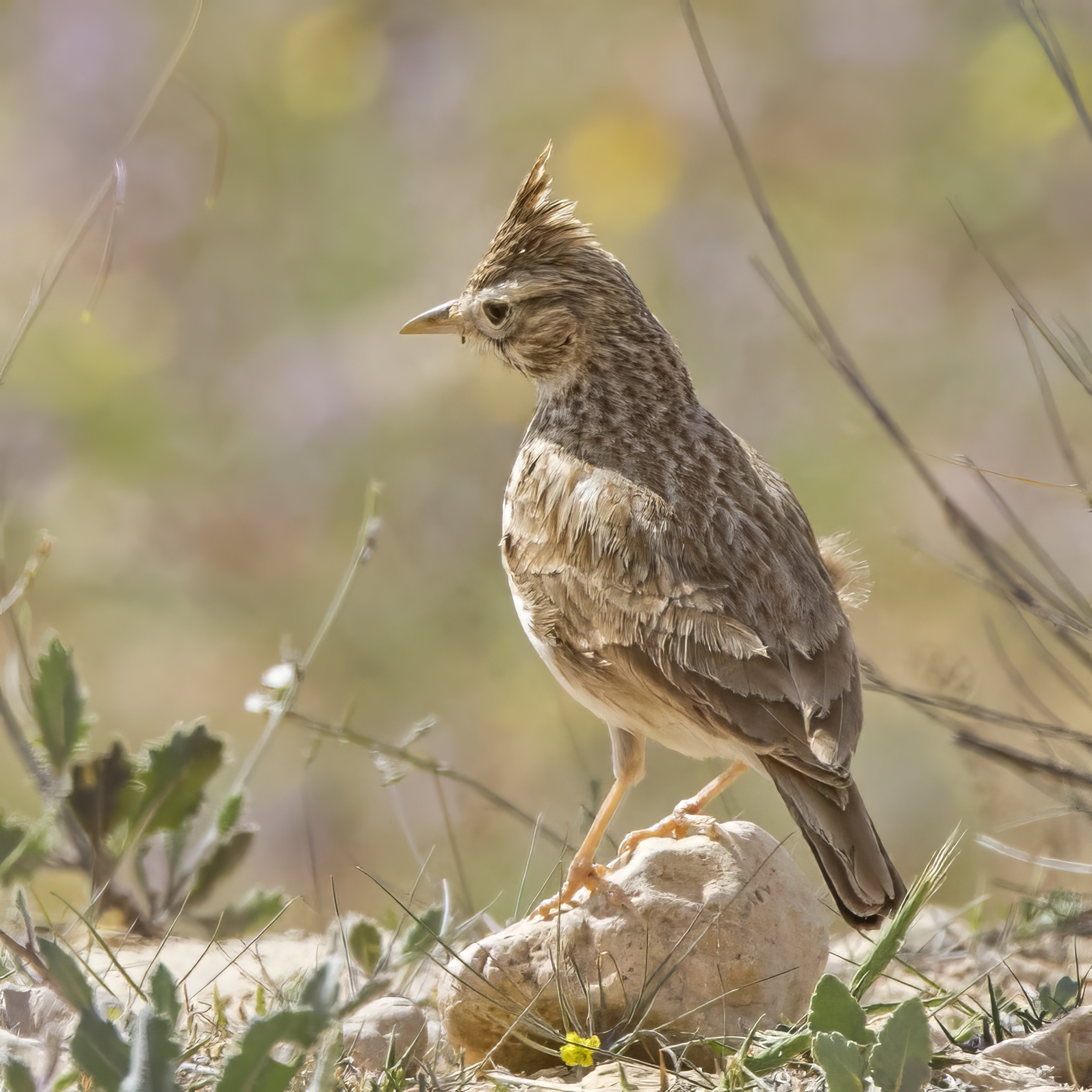
G. c. carthaginis, Tunisia

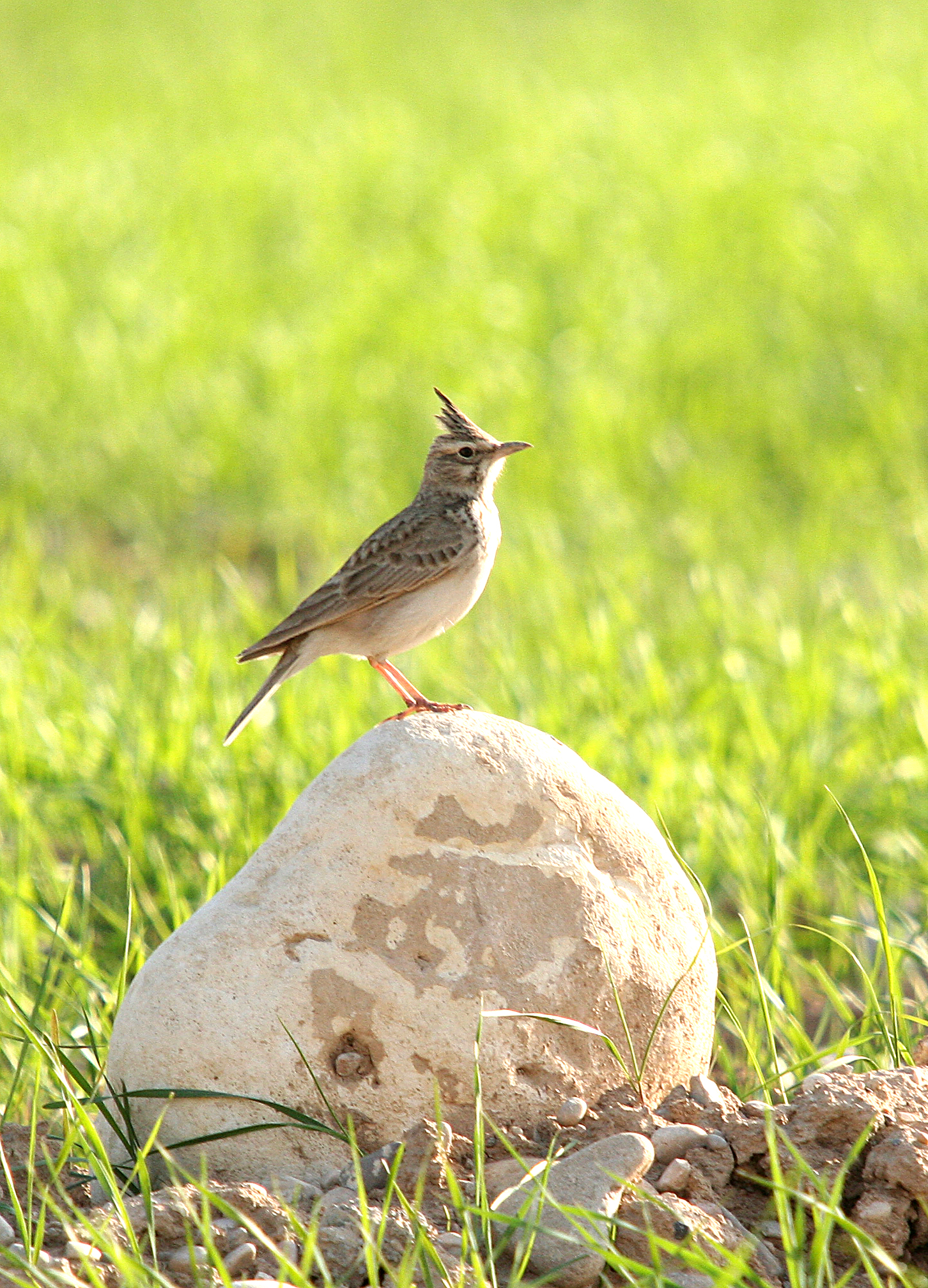
in Behbahan, Iran

== Description ==
A fairly small lark, the crested lark is roughly the same size as a Eurasian skylark, but shorter overall and bulkier around the head and body, and very similar in appearance, with a height of 17 cm (6.7 in) and a wingspan of 29 to 38 cm (11 to 15 in), weighing between 37 and 55 g (1.3 and 1.9 oz). It is a small, brown bird which has a short tail with light brown outer feathers. Male and females have no real differences, but young crested larks have more spots on their back than their older counterparts. Its plumage is downy but sparse and appears whitish. The distinct crest from which the crested lark gets its name is conspicuous at all times but is more pronounced during territorial or courtship displays and when singing. In flight it shows reddish underwings. It shares many characteristics with the Thekla lark, with the main distinctions between the two being the beak, the Thekla's heavier black-brown streaks and its grey underwing, present in European specimens.

== Distribution and habitat ==
The crested lark breeds across most of temperate Eurasia from Portugal to north-eastern China and eastern India, and in Africa south to Niger. It is non-migratory, and the sedentary nature of this species is illustrated by the fact that it is only a very rare vagrant to Great Britain, despite breeding as close as northern France. While the bird is not commonly found in Scandinavia today, it could be found in Sweden until the 1990s, with sources reporting six individual birds in 1992 before becoming extirpated in Sweden in 1993. The birds have also been extirpated in several other European countries, including Norway (1972), Luxembourg (1973) and Switzerland (1980s).

This is a common bird of dry, open country and is often seen by roadsides or in cereal fields, although it is also found occupying small, sandy patches by railways, docks and airfields.

== Behaviour ==
Video of singing bird

The crested lark is a songbird, and has a liquid, warbling song described onomatopoeically as a whee-whee-wheeoo or a twee-tee-too. It sings in flight from high in the sky, at roughly 30 to 60 m (98 to 197 ft) above the ground. The related Eurasian skylark exhibits similar behaviour but also sings during its ascent, whereas the crested lark sings either at altitude or on the ground. Their flight pattern is an example of undulatory locomotion.

=== Breeding ===
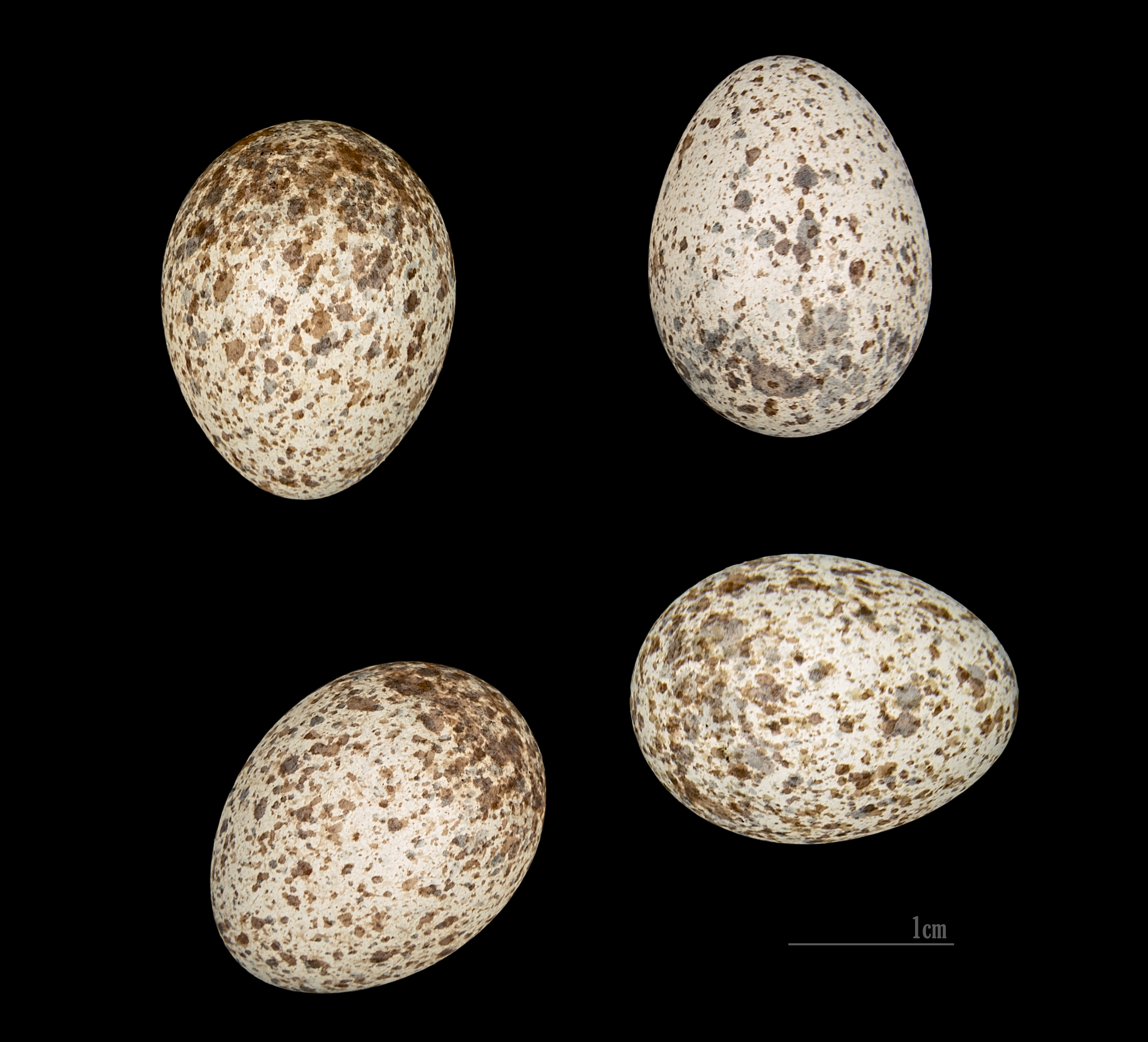
Eggs of Galerida cristata - MHNT

It nests in small depressions in the ground, often in wastelands and on the outskirts of towns. The nests are untidy structures composed primarily of dead grasses and roots. Three to five brown, finely speckled eggs, similar to those of the Eurasian skylark, are laid at a time and will hatch after 11–12 days. As with most larks, the chicks leave the nest early, after about eight days, and take flight after reaching 15–16 days old. Two broods will usually be raised each year.

=== Food and feeding ===
Largely vegetarian birds, crested larks primarily feed on grains and seeds, such as oats, wheat and barley, but will also eat insects, particularly beetles, with food either being scavenged from the ground or dug up. Juvenile birds are fed by both parents, and generally leave the nest before they are able to fly to start foraging for food themselves.

== Relationship to humans ==
Francis of Assisi considered the crested lark a bird of special significance, based on similarities he perceived between it and the life of the Friars Minor: its plain earth-coloured plumage and hood, its humility ("for it goes willingly along the wayside and finds a grain of corn for itself"), and its time spent in song.

== Status ==
The crested lark has been categorised by the IUCN Red List of Threatened Species as being of least concern, meaning that it is not currently threatened with extinction. Estimates for the global population of mature individuals of the species range from 22,000,000 to 91,200,000. Figures for Europe are less varied, with estimates putting the number of breeding pairs at between 3,600,000 and 7,600,000, or between 7,200,000 and 15,200,000 individuals. In Europe, trends since 1982 have shown an overall decline in the population of the species, resulting in the assumption that the crested lark is in decline globally.
