= Ethelbert Lort Phillips =

British botanist and ornithologist (1857-1943)

Ethelbert Edward ("Bertie") Lort Phillips (23 February 1857 in Haverfordwest – 15 October 1943 in Dartmouth) was a British naturalist, botanist and ornithologist.

He explored East Africa between 1884 and 1895 and collected many specimens of natural history. He named several taxons. He became a member of the British Ornithologists' Union in 1886. George Ernest Shelley in 1885 dedicated Oenanthe phillipsi in his name.
