= List of endemic birds of southern Africa =

The following is a list of bird species endemic or near-endemic to southern Africa (South Africa, Lesotho, Eswatini, Namibia, Botswana, Zimbabwe, and southern Mozambique).

- Grey-winged francolin, Scleroptila africanus
- Orange River francolin, Scleroptila levaillantoides
- Red-billed spurfowl (red-billed francolin), Pternistes adspersus
- Cape spurfowl (Cape francolin), Pternistes capensis
- Natal spurfowl (Natal francolin), Pternistes natalensis
- South African shelduck, Tadorna cana
- Cape shoveler, Anas smithii
- Fynbos buttonquail, Turnix hottentotta
- Knysna woodpecker, Campethera notata
- Ground woodpecker, Geocolaptes olivaceus
- Acacia pied barbet, Tricholaema leucomelas
- Monteiro's hornbill (Damara hornbill), Tockus monteiri
- Southern yellow-billed hornbill, Tockus leucomelas
- Bradfield's hornbill, Tockus bradfieldi
- White-backed mousebird, Colius colius
- Cape parrot, Poicephalus robustus
- Ruppell's parrot, Poicephalus rueppellii
- Rosy-faced lovebird, Agapornis roseicollis
- Bradfield's swift, Apus bradfieldi
- Knysna turaco, Tauraco corythaix
- Ludwig's bustard, Neotis ludwigii
- Red-crested korhaan, Eupodotis ruficrista
- Southern black korhaan (black bustard), Afrotis afra (Eupodotis afra)
- Northern black korhaan (white-quilled bustard), Afrotis afraoides (Eupodotis afraoides)
- Ruppell's korhaan, Eupodotis rueppellii
- Karoo korhaan, Eupodotis vigorsii
- Blue korhaan, Eupodotis caerulescens
- Blue crane, Anthropoides paradiseus
- Namaqua sandgrouse, Pterocles namaqua
- Double-banded sandgrouse, Pterocles bicinctus
- Burchell's sandgrouse, Pterocles burchelli
- Burchell's courser, Cursorius rufus
- Hartlaub's gull, Larus hartlaubii
- Cape vulture, Gyps coprotheres
- Black harrier, Circus maurus
- Southern pale chanting goshawk, Melierax canorus
- Forest buzzard, Buteo trizonatus
- Jackal buzzard, Buteo rufofuscus
- Crowned cormorant, Phalacrocorax coronatus
- Bank cormorant, Phalacrocorax neglectus
- Southern bald ibis, Geronticus calvus
- African penguin, Spheniscus demersus
- Southern tchagra, Tchagra tchagra
- Southern boubou, Laniarius ferrugineus
- Crimson-breasted shrike, Laniarius atrococcineus
- Bokmakierie, Telophorus zeylonus
- Olive bushshrike, Telophorus olivaceus
- White-tailed shrike, Lanioturdus torquatus
- Cape batis, Batis capensis
- Pririt batis, Batis pririt
- Southern white-crowned shrike, Eurocephalus anguitimens
- Cape rockjumper, Chaetops frenatus
- Drakensberg rockjumper, Chaetops aurantius
- Cape penduline tit, Anthoscopus minutus
- Carp's tit, Parus carpi
- Ashy tit, Parus cinerascens
- Grey tit, Parus afer
- African red-eyed bulbul, Pycnonotus nigricans
- Cape bulbul, Pycnonotus capensis
- Fairy flycatcher, Stenostira scita
- Rockrunner, Achaetops pycnopygius
- Cape grassbird, Sphenoeacus afer
- Victorin's warbler, Bradypterus victorini
- Karoo eremomela, Eremomela gregalis
- Knysna warbler, Bradypterus sylvaticus
- Barratt's warbler, Bradypterus barratti
- Black-faced babbler, Turdoides melanops
- Southern pied babbler, Turdoides bicolor
- Bush blackcap, Lioptilus nigricapillus
- Layard's tit-babbler, Parisoma layardi
- Chestnut-vented tit-babbler, Parisoma subcaeruleum
- Cape white-eye, Zosterops virens
- Orange River white-eye, Zosterops pallidus
- Grey-backed cisticola, Cisticola subruficapillus
- Rufous-winged cisticola, Cisticola galactotes
- Cloud cisticola, Cisticola textrix
- Black-chested prinia, Prinia flavicans
- Karoo prinia, Prinia maculosa
- Drakensberg prinia, Prinia hypoxantha
- Namaqua warbler, Phragmacia substriata
- Robert's warbler, Oreophilais robertsi
- Rufous-eared warbler, Malcorus pectoralis
- Rudd's apalis, Apalis ruddi
- Chirinda apalis, Apalis chirindensis
- Barred wren-warbler, Calamonastes fasciolatus
- Cinnamon-breasted warbler, Euryptila subcinnamomea
- Monotonous lark, Mirafra passerina
- Melodious lark, Mirafra cheniana
- Cape clapper lark, Mirafra apiata
- Eastern clapper lark, Mirafra fasciolata
- Sabota lark (incl. Bradfield's), Mirafra sabota
- Fawn-coloured lark, Calendulauda africanoides
- Rudd's lark, Heteromirafra ruddi
- Red lark, Certhilauda burra
- Karoo lark, Certhilauda albescens
- Barlow's lark, Certhilauda barlowi
- Dune lark, Certhilauda erythrochlamys
- Cape long-billed lark, Certhilauda curvirostris
- Agulhas long-billed lark, Certhilauda brevirostris
- Eastern long-billed lark, Certhilauda semitorquata
- Karoo long-billed lark, Certhilauda subcoronata
- Short-clawed lark, Certhilauda chuana
- Gray's lark, Ammomanes grayi
- Spike-heeled lark, Chersomanes albofasciata
- Black-eared sparrow-lark, Eremopterix australis
- Grey-backed sparrow-lark, Eremopterix verticalis
- Stark's lark, Eremalauda starki
- Pink-billed lark, Spizocorys conirostris
- Botha's lark, Spizocorys fringillaris
- Sclater's lark, Spizocorys sclateri
- Large-billed lark, Galerida magnirostris
- Cape rock thrush, Monticola rupestris
- Sentinel rock thrush, Monticola explorator
- Short-toed rock thrush, Monticola brevipes
- Karoo thrush, Turdus smithi
- Chat flycatcher, Bradornis infuscatus
- Marico flycatcher, Bradornis mariquensis
- Fiscal flycatcher, Sigelus silens
- White-throated robin-chat, Cossypha humeralis
- Chorister robin-chat, Cossypha dichroa
- Brown scrub robin, Cercotrichas signata
- Kalahari scrub robin, Cercotrichas paena
- Karoo scrub robin, Cercotrichas coryphaeus
- Herero chat, Namibornis herero
- Buff-streaked chat, Oenanthe bifasciata
- Mountain wheatear, Oenanthe monticola
- Sickle-winged chat, Cercomela sinuata
- Karoo chat, Cercomela schlegelii
- Tractrac chat, Cercomela tractrac
- Anteating chat, Myrmecocichla formicivora
- Boulder chat, Pinarornis plumosus
- Pale-winged starling, Onychognathus nabouroup
- Burchell's starling, Lamprotornis australis
- Pied starling, Spreo bicolor
- Gurney's sugarbird, Promerops gurneyi
- Cape sugarbird, Promerops cafer
- Orange-breasted sunbird, Anthobaphes violacea
- Southern double-collared sunbird, Cinnyris chalybea
- Greater double-collared sunbird, Cinnyris afra
- Neergaard's sunbird, Cinnyris neergaardi
- Dusky sunbird, Cinnyris fusca
- Great sparrow, Passer motitensis
- Cape sparrow, Passer melanurus
- Cape longclaw, Macronyx capensis
- Yellow-breasted pipit, Anthus chloris
- African rock pipit, Anthus crenatus
- Scaly-feathered finch, Sporopipes squamifrons
- Sociable weaver, Philetairus socius
- Cape weaver, Ploceus capensis
- Pink-throated twinspot, Hypargos margaritatus
- Swee waxbill, Estrilda melanotis
- Red-headed finch, Amadina erythrocephala
- Shaft-tailed whydah, Vidua regia
- Forest canary, Crithagra scotops
- Lemon-breasted canary, Crithagra citrinipectus
- Yellow canary, Crithagra flaviventris
- White-throated canary, Crithagra albogularis
- Protea canary, Crithagra leucoptera
- Cape siskin, Crithagra totta
- Drakensberg siskin, Crithagra symonsi
- Cape canary, Serinus canicollis
- Black-headed canary, Serinus alario
- Lark-like bunting, Emberiza impetuani
- Cape bunting, Emberiza capensis
