= Wildlife of South Africa =

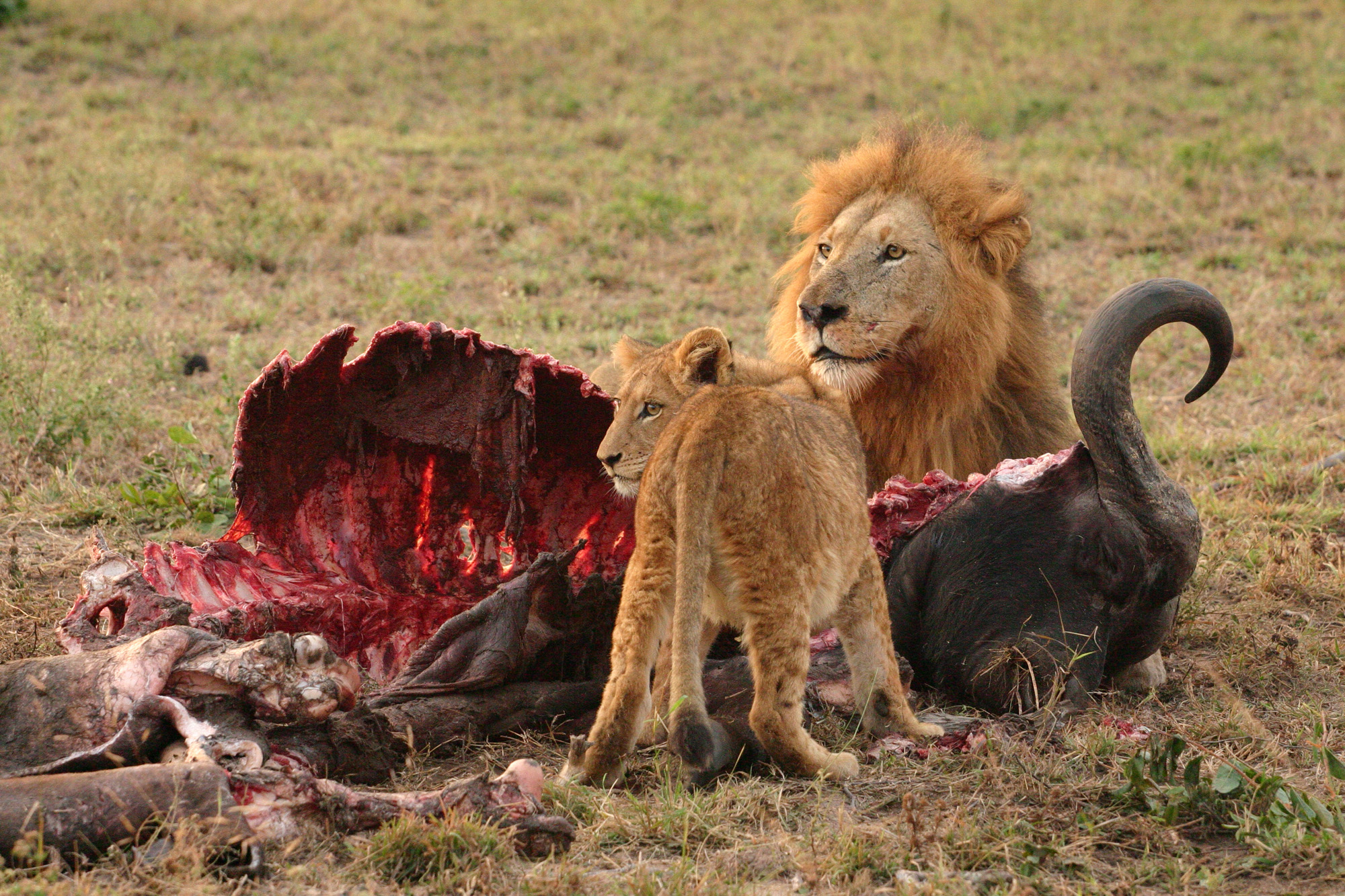
Male lion and cub feeding on a Cape buffalo, Sabi Sand Game Reserve

The wildlife of South Africa consists of the flora and fauna of this country in Southern Africa. The country has a range of different habitat types and an ecologically rich and diverse wildlife, vascular plants being particularly abundant, many of them endemic to the country. There are few forested areas, much savanna grassland, semi-arid Karoo vegetation and the fynbos of the Cape Floristic Region. Famed for its national parks and big game, 297 species of mammal have been recorded in South Africa, as well as 849 species of bird and over 20,000 species of vascular plants.

== Geography ==
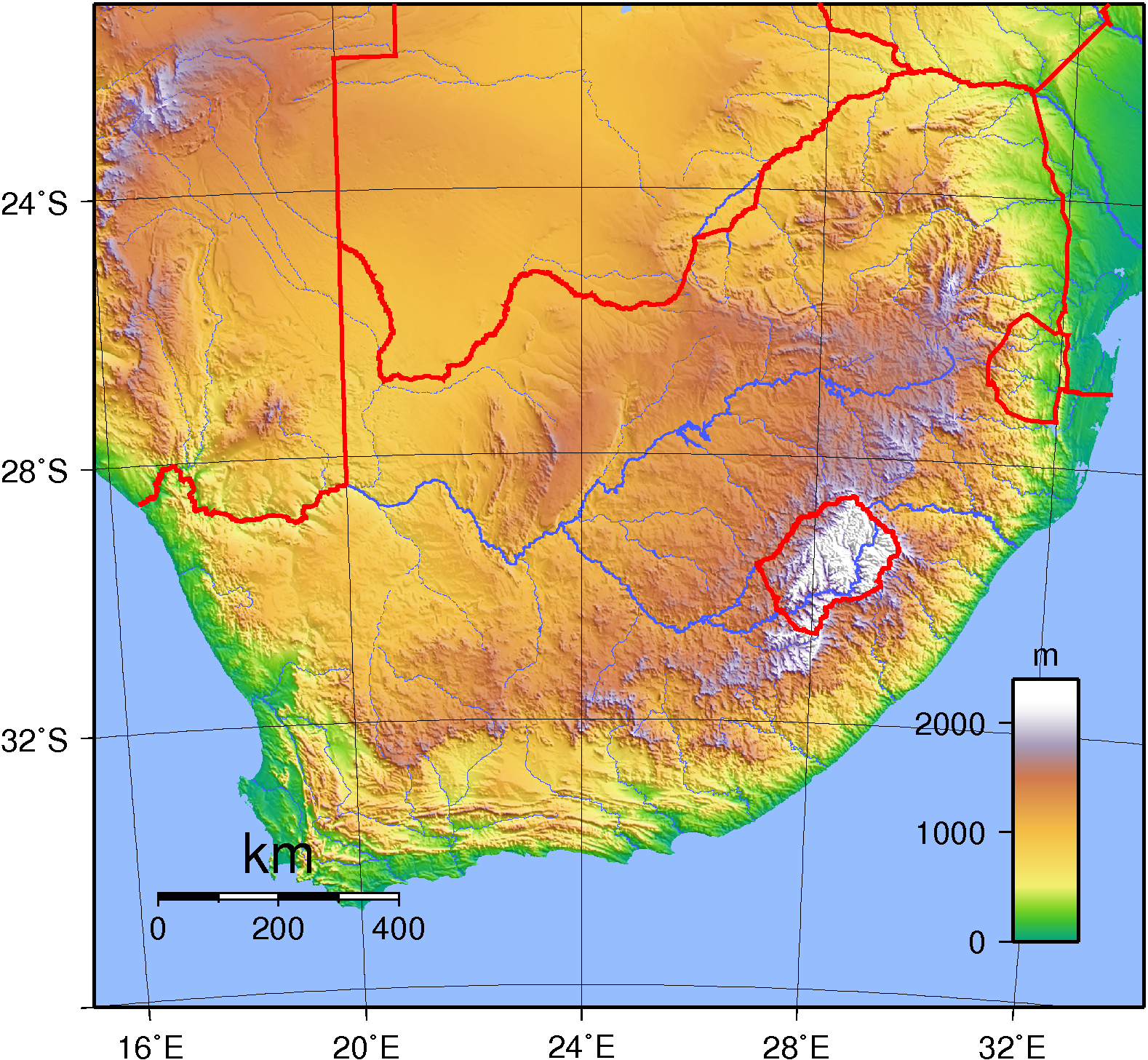
Topography of South Africa

South Africa is located in subtropical southern Africa, lying between 22°S and 35°S. It is bordered by Namibia, Botswana and Zimbabwe to the north, by Mozambique and Eswatini (Swaziland) to the northeast, by the Indian Ocean to the east and south, and the Atlantic Ocean to the west, the coastline extending for more than 2,500 km (1,600 mi). The interior of the country consists of a large, nearly flat, plateau with an altitude of between 1,000 m (3,300 ft) and 2,100 m (6,900 ft). The eastern, and highest, part of this is the Drakensberg, the highest point being Mafadi (3,450 m (11,320 ft)), which is on the border with Lesotho, a country surrounded by South Africa.

The south and south-western parts of the plateau, at approximately 1,100 to 1,800 m (3,600 to 5,900 ft) above sea level, and the adjoining plain below, at approximately 700 to 800 m (2,300 to 2,600 ft) above sea level, is known as the Great Karoo, and consists of sparsely populated shrubland. To the north the Great Karoo fades into the drier and more arid Bushmanland, which eventually becomes the Kalahari Desert in the far north-west of the country. The mid-eastern, and highest part of the plateau is known as the Highveld. This relatively well-watered area is home to a great proportion of the country's commercial farmlands. To the north of Highveld, the plateau slopes downwards into the Bushveld, which ultimately gives way to the Limpopo lowlands or lowveld.

The climate of South Africa is influenced by its position between two oceans and its elevation. Winters are mild in coastal regions, particularly in the Eastern Cape. Cold and warm coastal currents running north-west and north-east respectively account for the difference in climates between west and east coasts. The weather pattern is also influenced by the El Niño–Southern Oscillation. In the plateau area, the influence of the sea is reduced, and the daily temperature range is much wider; here the summer days are very hot, while the nights are usually cool, with the possibility of frosts in winter. The country experiences a high degree of sunshine with rainfall about half of the global average, increasing from west to east, and with semi-desert regions in the north-west. The Western Cape experiences a Mediterranean climate with winter rainfall, but most of the country has more rain in summer.

== Flora ==
A total of 23,420 species of vascular plant has been recorded in South Africa, making it the sixth most species-rich country in the world and the most species-rich country on the African continent. Of these, 153 species are considered to be threatened. Nine biomes have been described in South Africa: fynbos, succulent Karoo, desert, Nama Karoo, veld, savanna, Albany thickets, the Indian Ocean coastal belt, and forests.

The most prevalent biome in the country is the grassland, particularly on the Highveld, where the plant cover is dominated by different species of grass; fires, frosts and grazing pressure result in few trees occurring here, but geophytes (bulbs) are plentiful and there is a high level of plant diversity, especially on the escarpments. Vegetation becomes even more sparse towards the northwest due to low rainfall. There are several species of water-storing succulents, like aloes and euphorbias, in the very hot and dry Namaqualand area. The grass and thorn savannah turns slowly into a bush savannah towards the north-east of the country, with denser growth. There are significant numbers of baobab trees in this area, near the northern end of Kruger National Park.

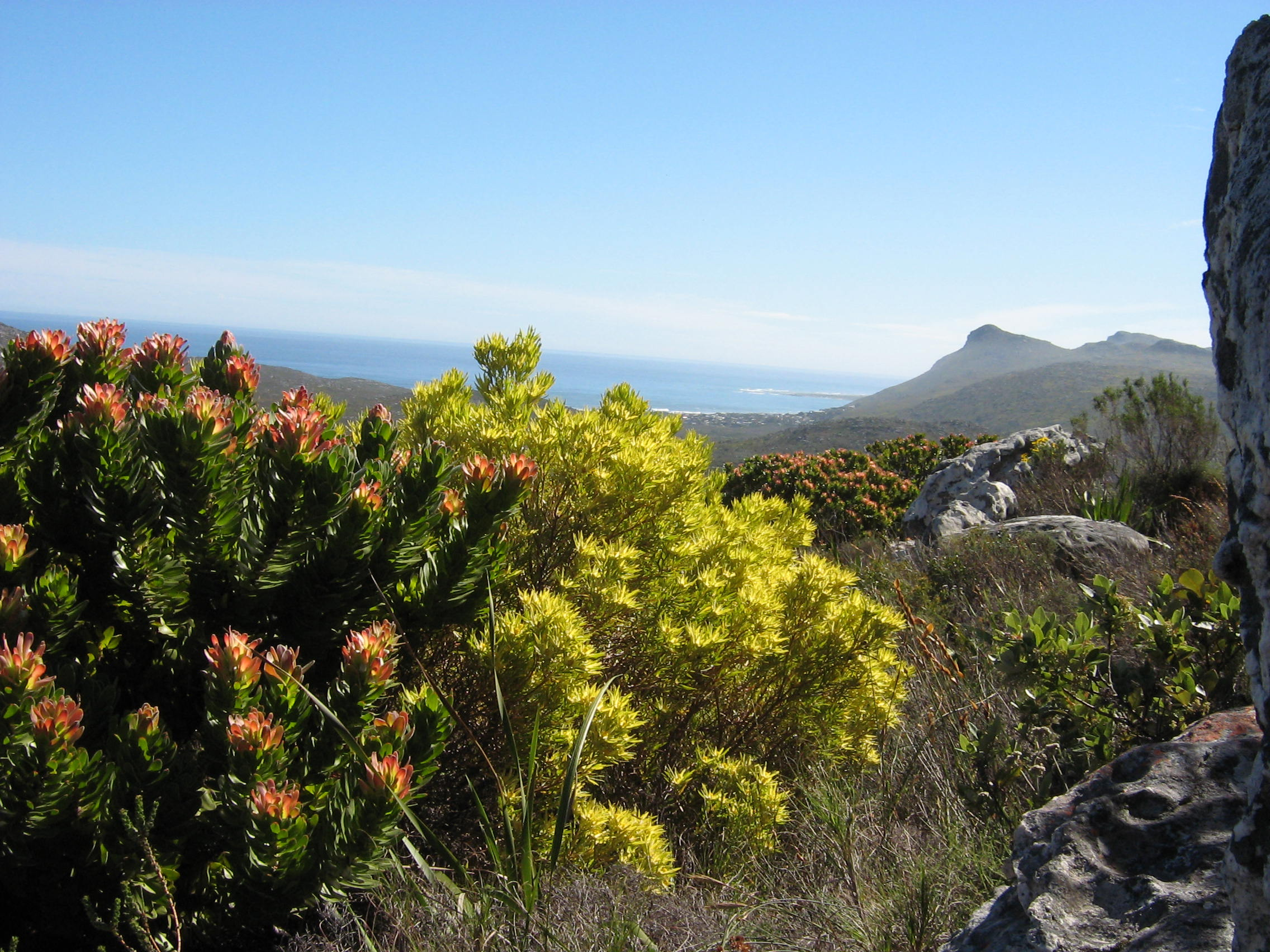
Fynbos vegetation on the Cape Peninsula

There are few forests in the country, these being largely restricted to patches on mountains and escarpments in high rainfall areas and gallery forests, and much of the plateau area is covered by grassland and savanna. The karoo occupies much of the drier western half of the country; this area is influenced by its proximity to the Atlantic and has winter rainfall. The vegetation here is dominated by dwarf succulent plants, with many endemic species of both plants and animals. Fynbos is a belt of natural shrubland located in the Western Cape and Eastern Cape provinces with a unique flora dominated by ericas, proteas and restios. This area is part of the Cape Floristic Region. The World Wide Fund for Nature divides this region into three ecoregions: the Lowland fynbos and renosterveld, the Montane fynbos and renosterveld and the Albany thickets. There is some concern that the Cape Floristic Region is experiencing one of the most rapid rates of extinction in the world due to habitat destruction, land degradation, and invasive alien plants.

The Cape Floral Region Protected Areas is a UNESCO World Heritage Site, a group of about thirteen protected areas that together cover an area of over a million hectares. This is a hotspot of diversity of endemic plants, many of which are threatened, and demonstrates ongoing ecological and evolutionary processes. This region occupies less than 0.5% of the area of the African continent yet has almost 20% of its plant species, almost 70% of the 9,000 plant species being endemic to the region. The Fynbos vegetation consists mainly of sclerophyllous shrubland. Of special interest is the pollination biology of the plants, many of which rely on ants, termites, birds or mammals for this function, the adaptions they have made to the fire risk, and the high level of adaptive radiation and speciation. The Mediterranean climate produces hot, dry summers, and many of the plants have underground storage organs allowing them to resprout after fires. A typical species is the silver tree, which grows naturally only on Table Mountain. Fire kills many of the trees but triggers the germination of the seeds, founding the next generation of these short-lived trees.

== Fauna ==
=== Mammals ===
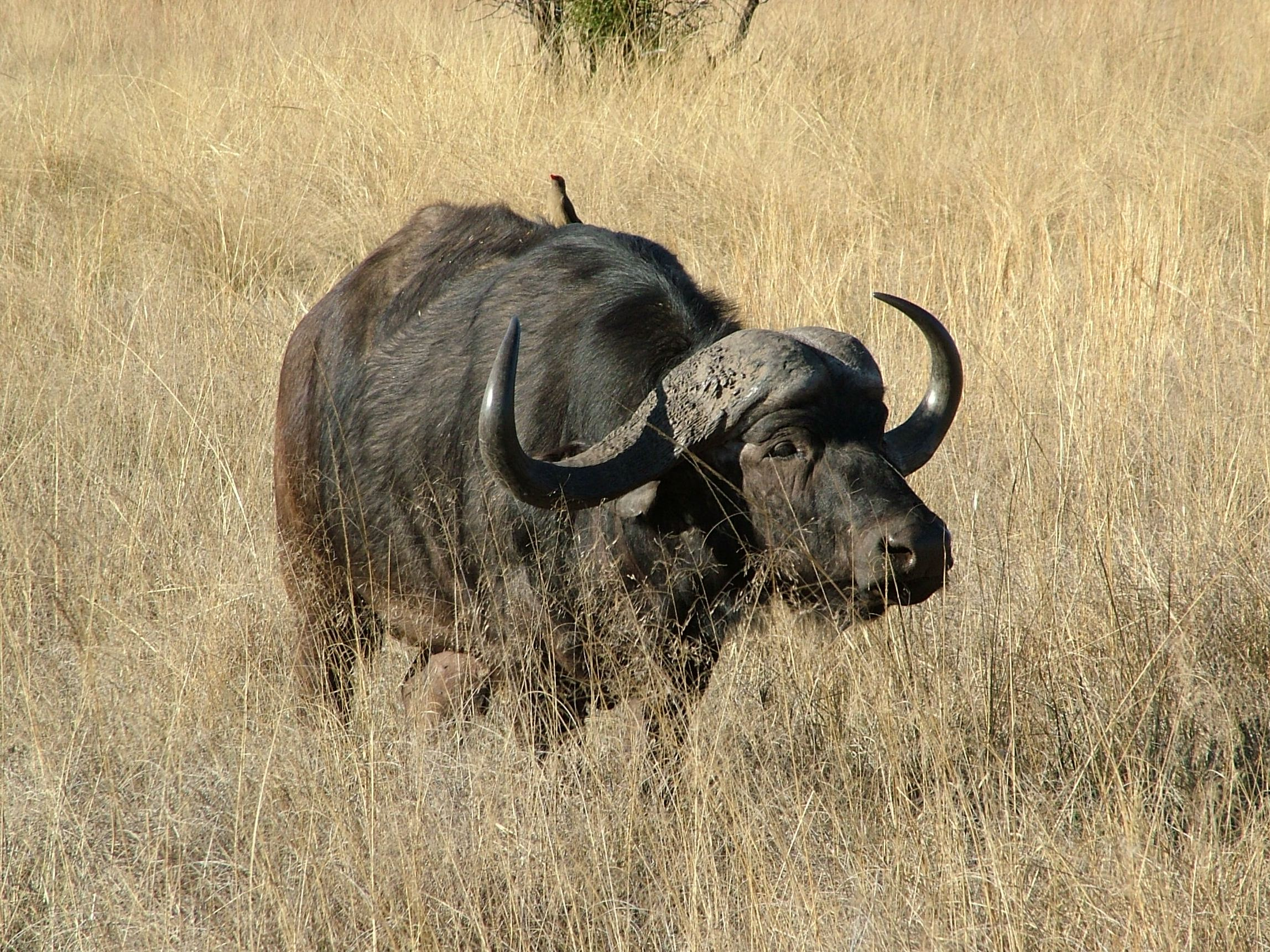
Cape buffalo

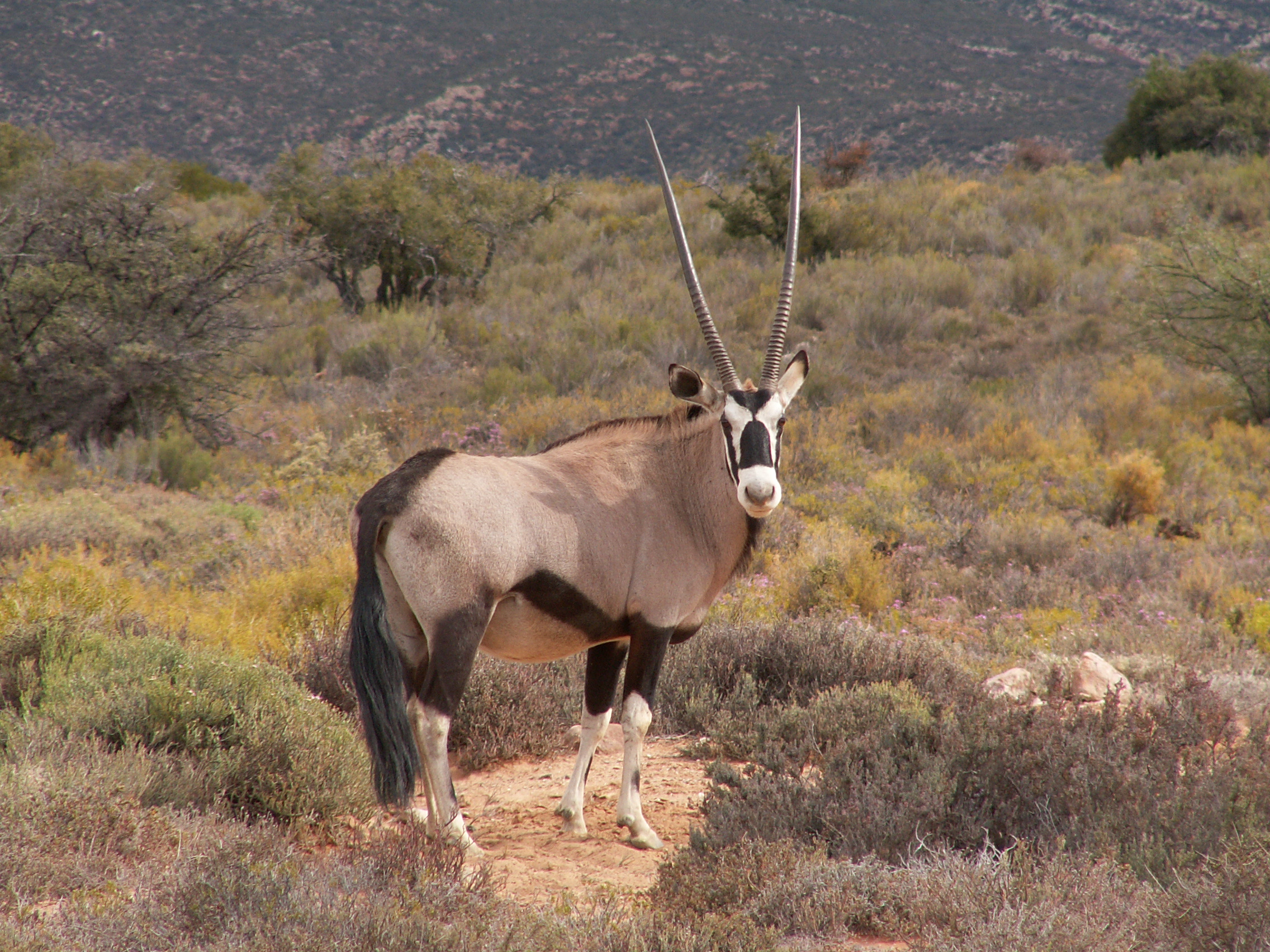
Gemsbok

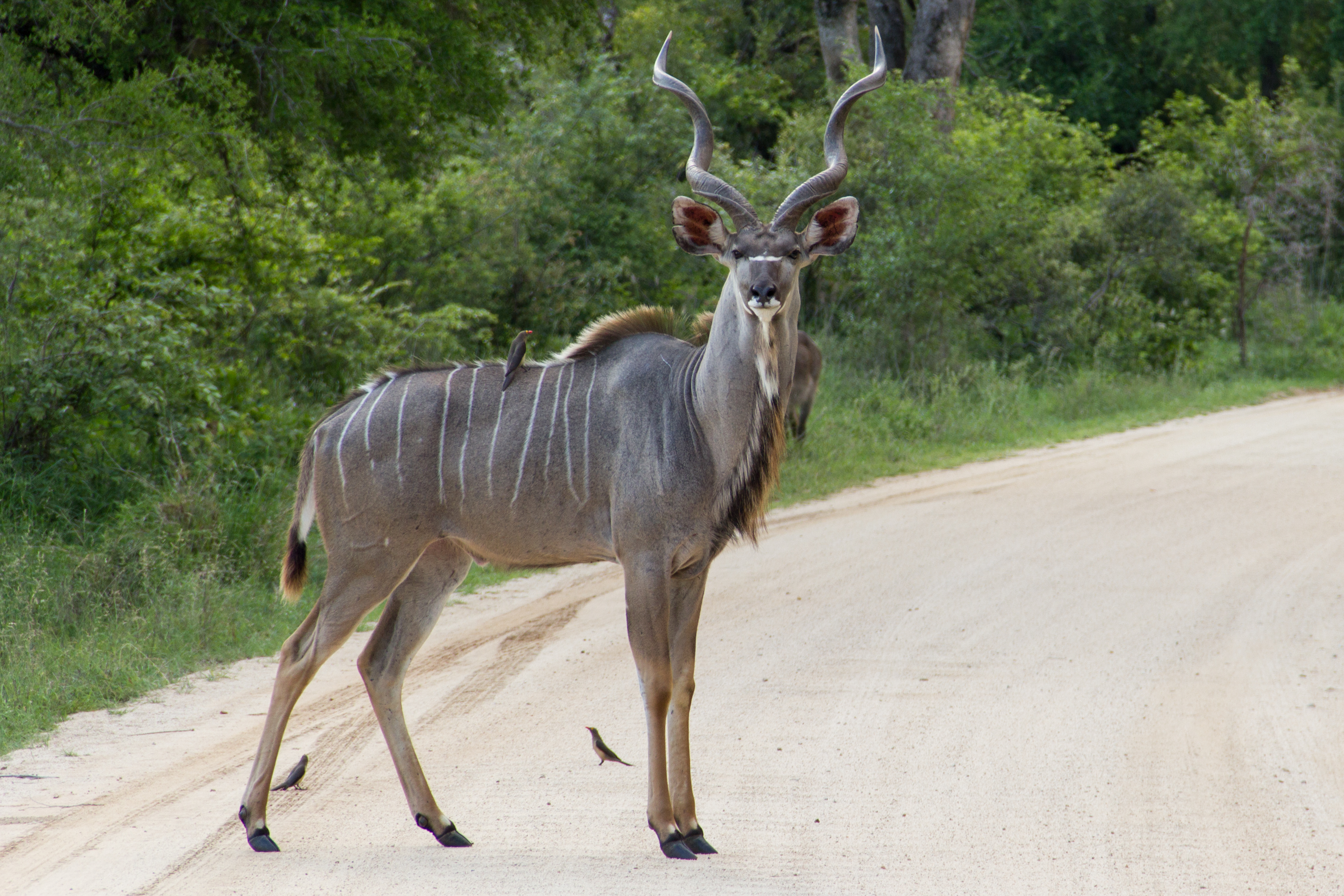
Greater kudu bull

Some 297 species of mammal have been recorded in South Africa, of which 30 species are considered threatened. The Kruger National Park, in the east of the country, is one of the largest national parks in the world, with an area of 19,485 square kilometres (7,523 sq mi) of grassland with scattered trees. It supports a wide range of ungulates including Burchell's zebra, impala, greater kudu, blue wildebeest, waterbuck, warthog, Cape buffalo, giraffe and hippopotamus. There are also black and white rhinoceroses, African elephant, African wild dog, cheetah, leopard, lion and spotted hyena.

Elsewhere in the country there are gemsbok, alternatively known as oryx, nyala, bushbuck and springbok. There are seventeen species of golden mole, a family limited to southern Africa, five species of elephant shrew, many species of shrews, the southern African hedgehog, the aardvark, various hares and the critically endangered riverine rabbit. There are numerous species of bat and a great many species of rodent. Primates are represented by the Mohol bushbaby, the brown greater galago, the Sykes' monkey, the vervet monkey and the chacma baboon. Smaller carnivores include mongooses, genets, the caracal, the serval, the African wildcat, the Cape fox, the side-striped jackal, the black-backed jackal, meerkats, and the African clawless otter. The brown fur seal and other species of seal occur on the coasts and the waters around the country are visited by numerous species of whale and dolphin.

=== Birds ===
With its diverse habitat types, South Africa has a wide range of residential and migratory species. According to the 2018 edition of The Clements Checklist of Birds of the World, 849 species of bird have been recorded in South Africa and its offshore islands. Of these, 125 species are vagrants, and about 30 are endemic either to South Africa, or the more inclusive South Africa/Lesotho/Eswatini region. The endemic species include the southern black and blue korhaans, the grey-winged francolin, the Knysna turaco, the Fynbos buttonquail, the southern bald ibis, the forest buzzard, the ground woodpecker, the Cape and Drakensberg rockjumpers, the Cape, eastern and Agulhas long-billed larks, the red, Karoo, Rudd's and Botha's larks, the Cape bulbul, the Victorin's and Knysna warblers, the Drakensberg prinia, the bush blackcap, the Cape sugarbird, the chorister robin-chat, the sentinel and Cape rock thrushes, the buff-streaked chat, the pied starling, the African Penguin, and the orange-breasted sunbird.

The common ostrich is plentiful on the open grassland and savannah areas. Some birds breed elsewhere but migrate to South Africa to overwinter, while others breed in the country but migrate away in the non-breeding season. Migratory species include the greater striped swallow, white-rumped swift, white stork, African pygmy kingfisher, yellow-billed kite and the European bee-eater.

=== Reptiles and amphibians ===
There is a rich fauna of reptiles and amphibians, with 447 species of reptile recorded in the country (as compiled by the Reptile Database), and 132 species of amphibian (compiled by AmphibiaWeb). South Africa has the richest diversity of reptiles of any African country. Endemic species include the angulate tortoise and geometric tortoise, the Zululand dwarf chameleon, the Transkei dwarf chameleon and the Robertson dwarf chameleon, the Broadley's flat lizard, the dwarf Karoo girdled lizard, the Soutpansberg rock lizard, and the yellow-bellied house snake.

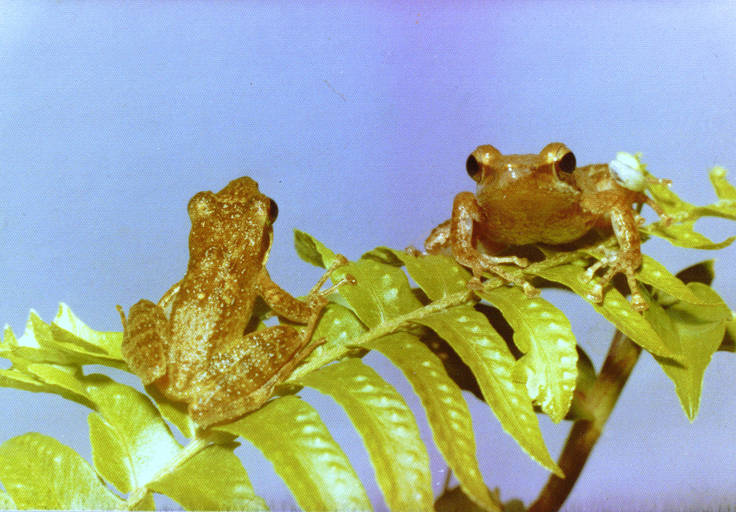
Natal diving frog

Also included among the fauna are the Nile crocodile, the leopard tortoise, the Speke's hinge-back tortoise, the serrated hinged terrapin, various chameleons, lizards, geckos and skinks, the cape cobra, the black mamba, the eastern green mamba, the puff adder, the mole snake and a range of other venomous and non-venomous snakes.

Amphibian species of interest include the endemic western leopard toad and the arum frog, the bronze caco, the spotted snout-burrower and the critically endangered Rose's ghost frog, found only on the slopes of Table Mountain. Another endangered endemic species is the Natal diving frog.

== National parks ==
The following have been designated as national parks in South Africa:

- Addo Elephant National Park
- Agulhas National Park
- Augrabies Falls National Park
- Bontebok National Park
- Camdeboo National Park
- Garden Route National Park
- Golden Gate Highlands National Park
- Karoo National Park
- Kgalagadi Transfrontier Park
- Kruger National Park
- Mapungubwe National Park
- Marakele National Park
- Mokala National Park
- Mountain Zebra National Park
- Namaqua National Park
- Richtersveld National Park
- Table Mountain National Park
- Tankwa Karoo National Park
- West Coast National Park

== South African endangered species ==
Some animals in South Africa are classified as "endangered" or "critically endangered". These include:

- Giant golden mole, Chrysospalax trevelyani
- Van Zyl's golden mole, Cryptochloris zyli
- Marley's golden mole, Amblysomus marleyi
- Gunning's golden mole, Neamblysomus gunningi
- Juliana's golden mole, Neamblysomus julianae
- White-tailed rat, Mystromys albicaudatus
- African wild dog, Lycaon pictus
- Sei whale, Balaenoptera borealis
- Blue whale, Balaenoptera musculus
- African penguin, Spheniscus demersus

=== Critically endangered ===
- De Winton's golden mole, Cryptochloris wintoni
- Riverine rabbit, Bunolagus monticularis
- Hooded vulture, Necrosyrtes monachus
- White-headed vulture, Trigonoceps occipitalis
- White-backed vulture, Gyps africanus
