= Long-billed lark =

Long-billed lark refers to:

- any of five species of long-billed lark in southern Africa,
- formerly the large-billed lark of South Africa and Lesotho

In part it also referred to:

- Somali lark of the Horn of Africa
- Spike-heeled lark of southern Africa

== See also ==
- Hoopoe larks
