= Large-billed Sabota lark =

Large-billed Sabota lark may refer to:

- Certhilauda subcoronata bradshawi, a subspecies of the Karoo long-billed lark
- Sabota lark, a species of lark
