= Damara longbill =

Damara longbill may refer to:

- Certhilauda benguelensis kaokoensis, a subspecies of the Benguela long-billed lark
- Karoo long-billed lark, a species of lark
