= Lesser hoopoe-lark =

Conservation status
- Least Concern (IUCN 3.1)

Scientific classification
- Kingdom: Animalia
- Phylum: Chordata
- Class: Aves
- Order: Passeriformes
- Family: Alaudidae
- Genus: Alaemon
- Species: A. hamertoni

Binomial name
- Alaemon hamertoni Witherby, 1905

Subspecies
- See text
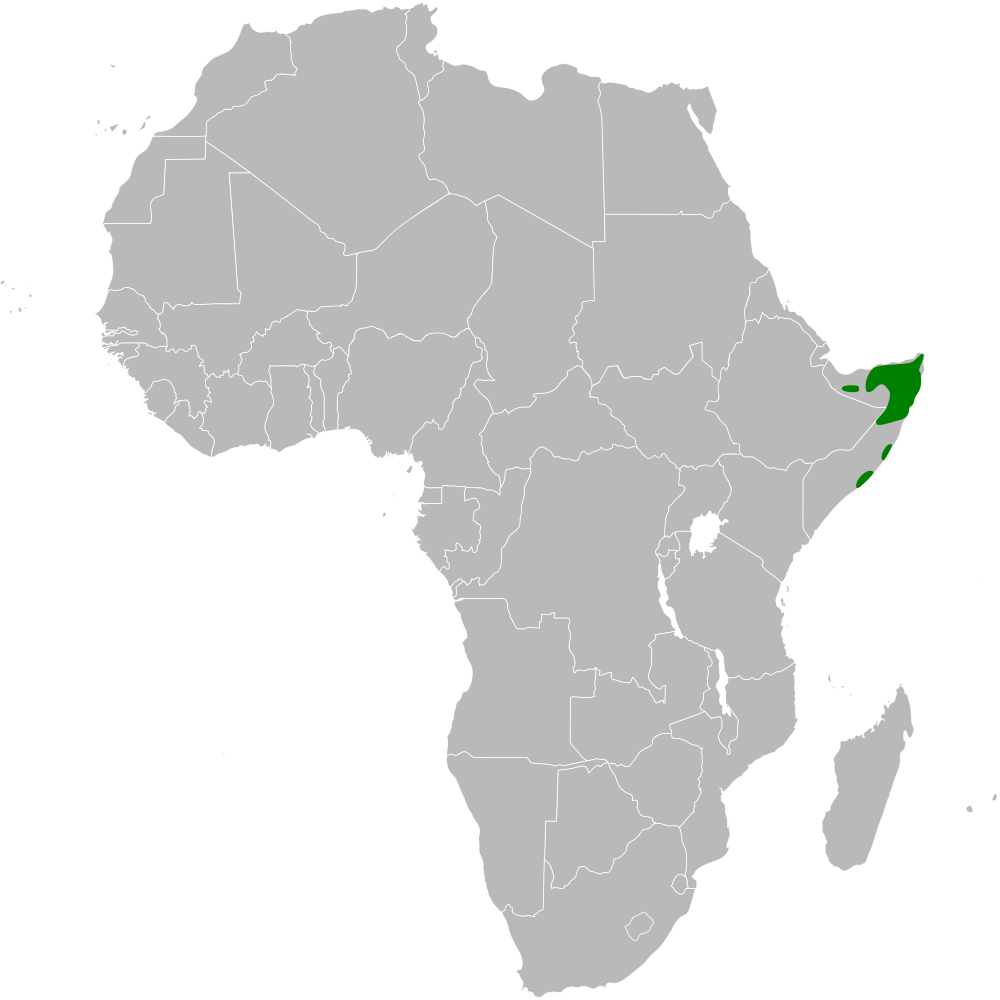
- resident range

Species of bird

The lesser hoopoe-lark (Alaemon hamertoni) is a species of lark in the family Alaudidae. It is endemic to Somalia where its natural habitat is subtropical or tropical dry lowland grassland.

== Taxonomy and systematics ==
The lesser hoopoe-lark has alternately been named Witherby's lark.

=== Subspecies ===
Three subspecies are recognized:

- Warangeli lesser hoopoe-lark (A. h. alter) - Witherby, 1905: Found in northern and north-eastern Somalia
- Burao lesser hoopoe-lark (A. h. tertius) - Clarke, S, 1919: Found in north-western Somalia
- A. h. hamertoni - Witherby, 1905: Found in central Somalia
