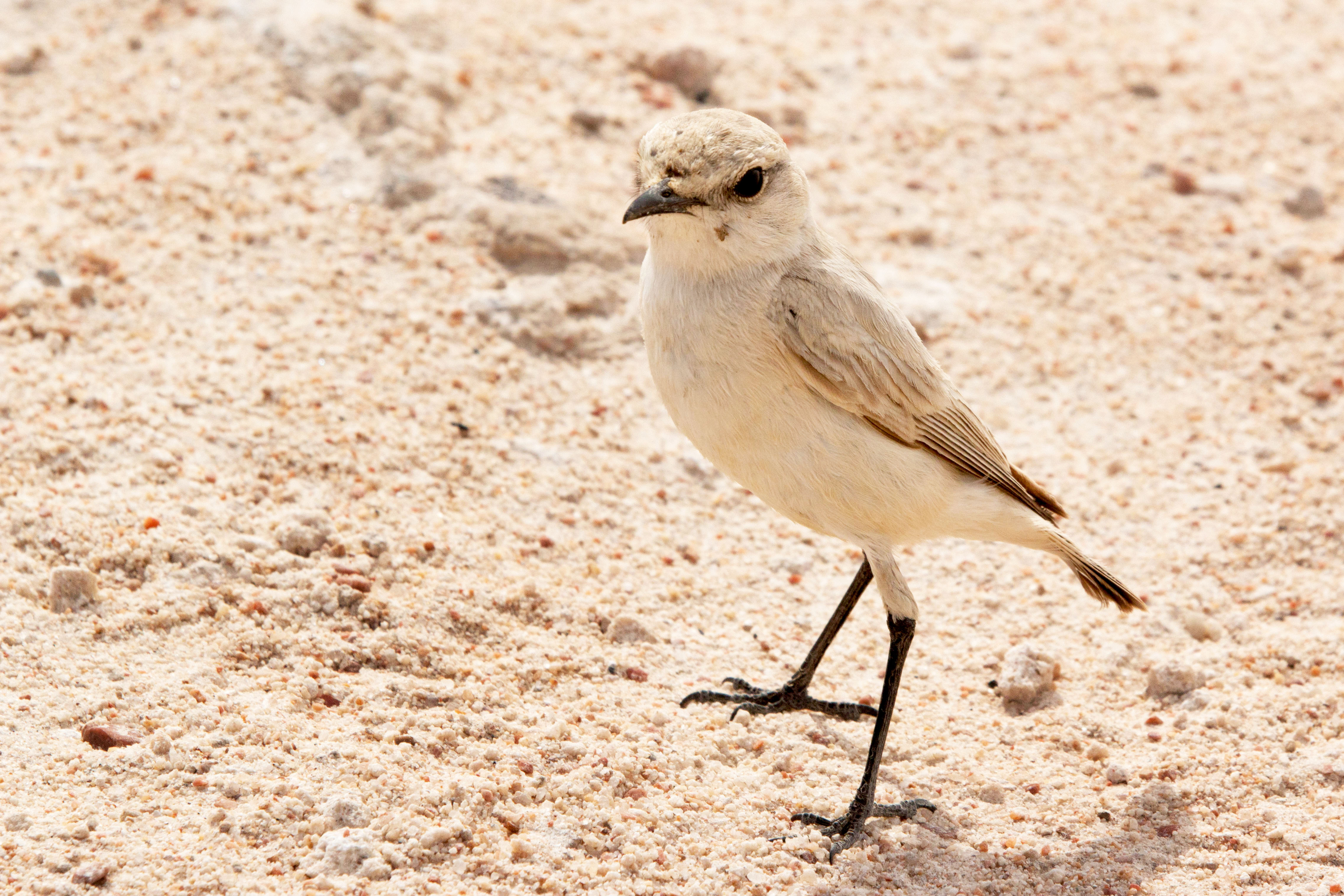

Conservation status
- Least Concern (IUCN 3.1)

Scientific classification
- Kingdom: Animalia
- Phylum: Chordata
- Class: Aves
- Order: Passeriformes
- Family: Muscicapidae
- Genus: Namibornis; Bradfield, 1935
- Species: N. herero

Binomial name
- Namibornis herero (Meyer de Schauensee, 1931)

Synonyms
- Bradornis herero Meyer de Schauensee, 1931; Melaenornis herero (Meyer de Schauensee, 1931)

= Herero chat =

Species of bird

The Herero chat (Namibornis herero) is a species of passerine bird belonging to the family Muscicapidae, the chats and Old World flycatchers. It is the only species in the monospecific genus Namibornis and it has a restricted range in southwestern Africa.

== Taxonomy ==
The Herero chat was first formally described in 1931 as Bradornis herero by the Italian-born American ornithologist Rodolphe Meyer de Schauensee with its type locality given as Karibib in Damaraland in Namibia. In 1935 R. D. Bradfield proposed the new genus Namibornis for this species, noting that he thought it was more closely related to Cossypha than Bradornis. The Herero chat is classified within the Tribe Muscicapini in subfamily Muscicapinae, meaning that it is an old World flycatcher rather than a chat and is closer to Bradornis than Cossypha, within the family Muscicapidae.

== Etymology ==
The Hereo chat has the genus name Namibornis which suffixes ornis meaning "bird" onto Namib, i.e. the Namib Desert. The specific name herero, is the name of the Herero people who live in the Namib Desert.

== Description ==
The Herero chat has a length of 17 cm (6.7 in). The adults have a blackish mask, similar to that of a shrike with a wide white supercilium and a white throat. The upperparts are brown, warmer more red in colour on the rump and tail, although the central feathers of the tail are blackish-brown. The underparts are whitish, sometimes washed brown with faint dark streaks.

== Distribution and habitat ==
The Herero chat is found in southwestern Africa where its range corresponds to the Namibian savanna woodlands, from the far southwest of Angola through western Namibia as far south as the Naukluft Mountains. This is a locally common species found on inselbergs and escarpments with scattered Acacia, Maerua shrubs, Commiphora and Terminalia trees, particularly where the vegetation follows drainage lines.

== Biology ==
The Herero chat is mainly insectivorous with most of its food consisting of ants and termites, as well as grasshoppers and crickets, beetles and spiders. It will also feed on the berries of Commiphora saxicola, as well as seeds. Some foraging is done from shady perches with the prey pounced on from above, they also occasionally hawk insects in the air and forage on the ground at the bases of trees and bushes, sometimes digging in the earth to expose prey.

Both sexes participate in the construction of the nest, taking about 3 or 4 days. They start by putting grass leaves into a crack or hole in a tree or in a fork. They then include rootlets, thin strips of bark and other plant fibres in the structure before both the male and female mould the nest with their bodies into an open cup. A typical location for the nest is at the base of a tree's canopy particularly if the tree is close to a rock outcrop, at the base of a slope or close to drainage lines. The eggs are laid in February and March, with laying often coinciding with rainfall. The clutch is 2 or 3 eggs with the female being responsible for most of the incubation. Incubation lasts for around 16 days, during which the female eats a lot of berries of Commiphora saxicola. Both parents feed the chicks which fledge in 12 to 16 days. Following fledging the juveniles remain with the adults until they become fully independent between 3 and 5 months after fledging.
