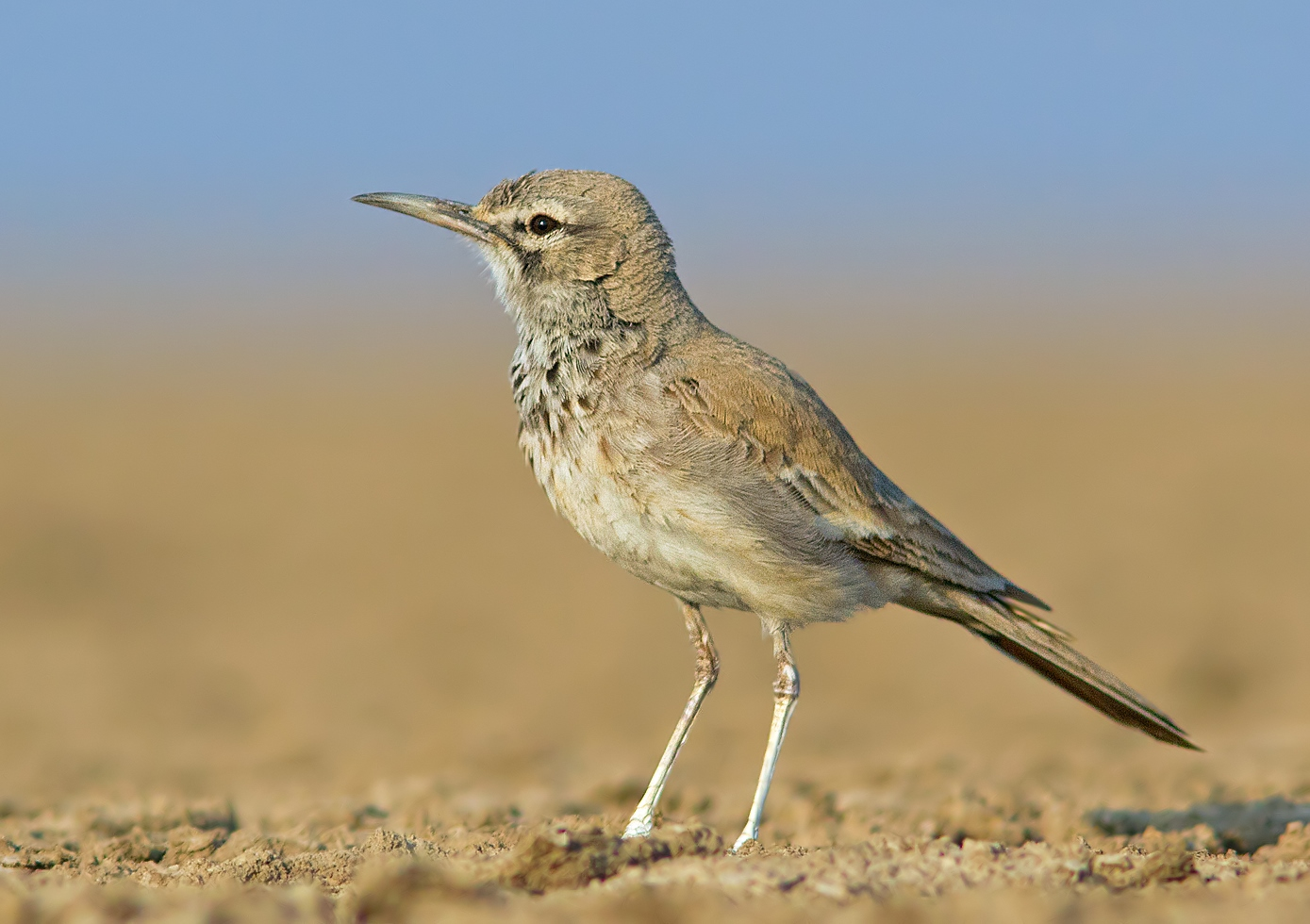
- Greater hoopoe-lark (Alaemon alaudipes)

Scientific classification
- Kingdom: Animalia
- Phylum: Chordata
- Class: Aves
- Order: Passeriformes
- Family: Alaudidae
- Genus: Alaemon; Keyserling & Blasius, 1840

Type species
- Alauda desertorum Stanley, 1814

Species
- Alaemon alaudipes; Alaemon hamertoni
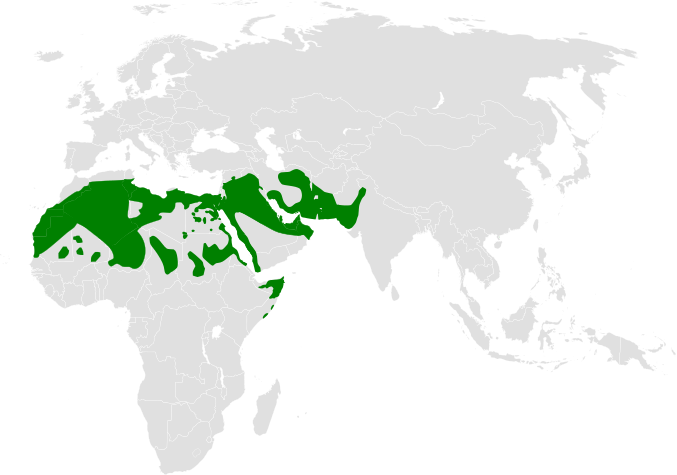
- range of genus

= Alaemon =

Genus of birds

Alaemon is a genus of birds in the family Alaudidae, commonly called hoopoe larks.

== Taxonomy and systematics ==
The name Alaemon comes from the Greek alēmōn, meaning "wanderer" (from alaomai, meaning "to wander"). The genus was established by Alexander Keyserling and Johann Heinrich Blasius in 1840.

=== Extant species ===
The genus contains two species:

Image	Scientific name	Common name	Distribution
	Alaemon alaudipes	Greater hoopoe-lark	Cape Verde Islands across much of northern Africa, through the Arabian peninsula, Syria, Afghanistan, Pakistan and India
	Alaemon hamertoni	Lesser hoopoe-lark	Somalia

=== Former species ===
Other species, or subspecies, formerly considered as species in the genus Alaemon include:

- Damara longbill (as Alaemon damarensis)
- Gordonia longbill (as Alaemon bradshawi)
- Benguela long-billed lark (as Alaemon benguelensis)
- South-eastern Dupont's lark (as Alaemon Margaritae)
