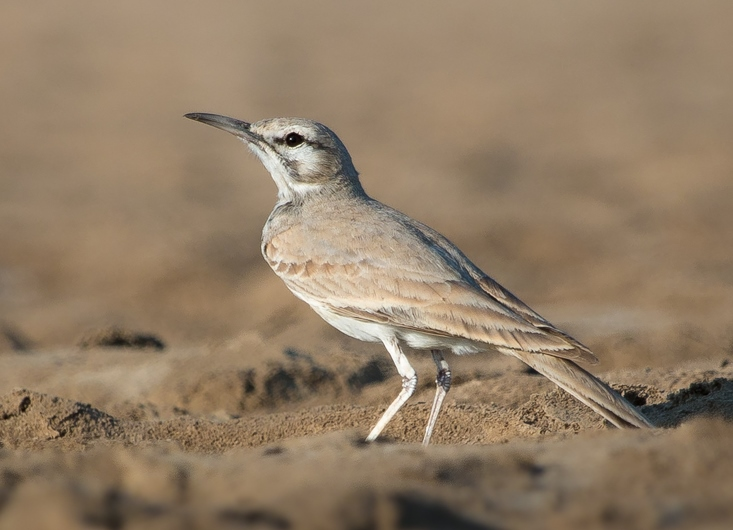
- Individual from Little Rann of Kutch

Conservation status
- Least Concern (IUCN 3.1)

Scientific classification
- Kingdom: Animalia
- Phylum: Chordata
- Class: Aves
- Order: Passeriformes
- Family: Alaudidae
- Genus: Alaemon
- Species: A. alaudipes

Binomial name
- Alaemon alaudipes (Desfontaines, 1789)

Subspecies
- See text
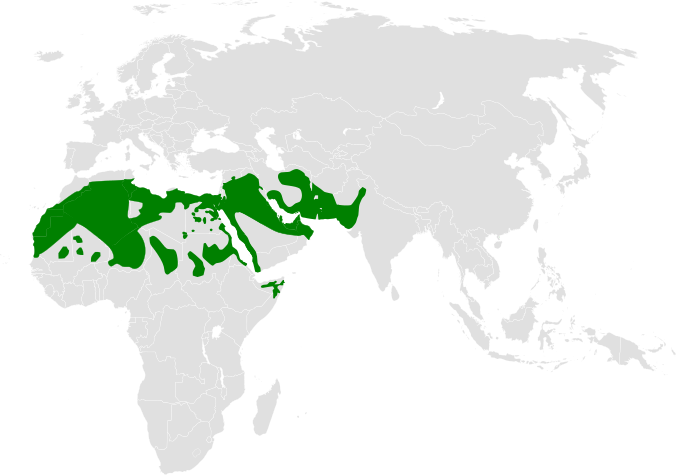
- Resident range

Synonyms
- Upupa alaudipes; Certhilauda desertorum

= Greater hoopoe-lark =

Species of bird

The greater hoopoe-lark (Alaemon alaudipes) is a passerine bird which is a breeding resident of arid, desert and semi-desert regions from the Cape Verde Islands across much of northern Africa, through the Arabian Peninsula, Syria, Afghanistan, Pakistan and India. It was formerly known as the bifasciated lark and sometimes as the large desert lark.

== Taxonomy and systematics ==
Formerly, the greater hoopoe-lark was classified as belonging to the genera Upupa and Certhilauda until moved to Alaemon. The name Alaemon comes from the Greek alēmōn, meaning "wanderer" (from alaomai, meaning "to wander"). The genus was established by Alexander Keyserling and Johann Heinrich Blasius in 1840.

=== Subspecies ===
Four subspecies are recognized:

- Cape Verde greater hoopoe-lark (A. a. boavistae) - Hartert, 1917: Found on the Cape Verde Islands
- North African greater hoopoe-lark (A. a. alaudipes) - (Desfontaines, 1789): Found in northern Africa from southern Morocco and Mauritania to the Sinai Peninsula
- A. a. desertorum - (Stanley, 1814): Originally described as a separate species in the genus Alauda. Found in north-eastern Sudan to northern Somalia, central Saudi Arabia to southern Yemen
- Eastern greater hoopoe-lark (A. a. doriae) - (Salvadori, 1868): Originally described as a separate species in the genus Certhilauda. Found in eastern Arabia to Iraq, Iran and north-western India

== Description ==
This lark is large, long-legged and slender-bodied with a distinctive down-curved bill. The face has dark markings including a line through the eye and whisker like-lines from the base of bill running under the eye. The breast is spotted and the underside is buffy white while the upper-parts are sandy grey. The female is slightly smaller with less prominent markings and the bill is slightly shorter. The hind claw is short and straight. The curved upper beak has the nostril opening exposed. The tongue is bifid at the tip.

== Behaviour and ecology ==
Birds are seen singly or in pairs as they forage by running or walking in spurts, probing and digging the ground. They have been recorded to feed on the fruiting bodies of certain fungi. The breeding season is mainly after the first rains, in India most records are from March to July. Late records in August when the rains were delayed have been noted in India. The courtship display of the male consists of rising with fluttering wing-strokes and then diving down with closed wings to a perch. The slow flappy start to the song flight recall a hoopoe for which this species is named. The striking wing pattern of black wing feathers with a white base and trailing edge; and a white tail with black outer feathers are displayed in flight. The male also sings with rising and falling notes consisting of trilled whistles and clicks that have been transcribed as a tee-tee-tee followed by a prolonged tee-hoo while nosediving. The typical call is a rolling zreee or too. The nest is a cup made up of small sticks and placed on a low bush or on the ground, sometimes at the base of a bush. The nest is prominent and often placed on an isolated bush. Two or three eggs are laid and both sexes take turns in incubation. They feed on insects and other invertebrates, small lizards and seeds. Young birds are capable of swift running even before they can fly. The female may perform distraction displays when the young or nest are threatened.

During the heat of the day, they may shelter in the burrows of Uromastyx lizards. The water loss through their skin varies with temperature and they are able to live in very arid conditions. Their breeding is dependent on the rains and in very dry years they may not breed.

== Distribution and populations ==
The wide distribution consists of several populations that have been designated as subspecies. These include boavistae of the Cape Verde Islands, the nominate alaudipes of the north African Sahara region and northern Arabia. Subspecies desertorum has been assigned to the populations along the Red Sea coast while the eastern population of Iraq, Pakistan and north-western India are assigned to doriae. Forms like pallida and variety cinerea are included in doriae.

== Gallery ==
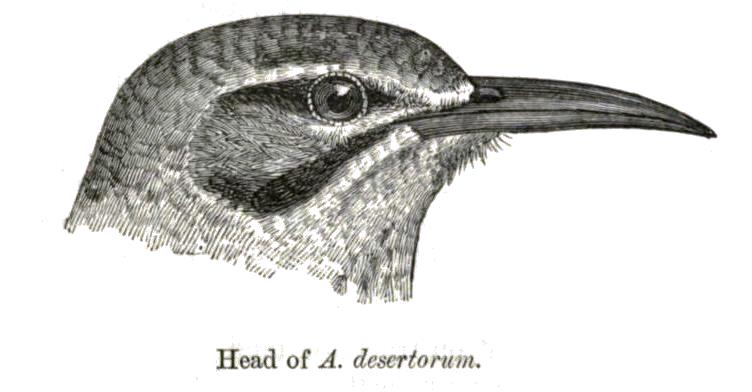
Head pattern of male

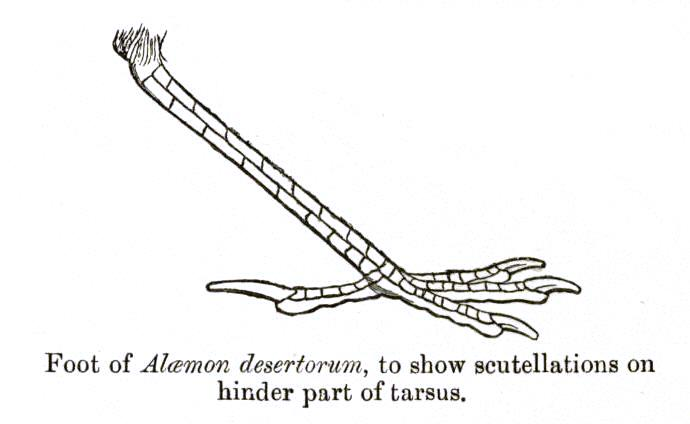
Tarsus

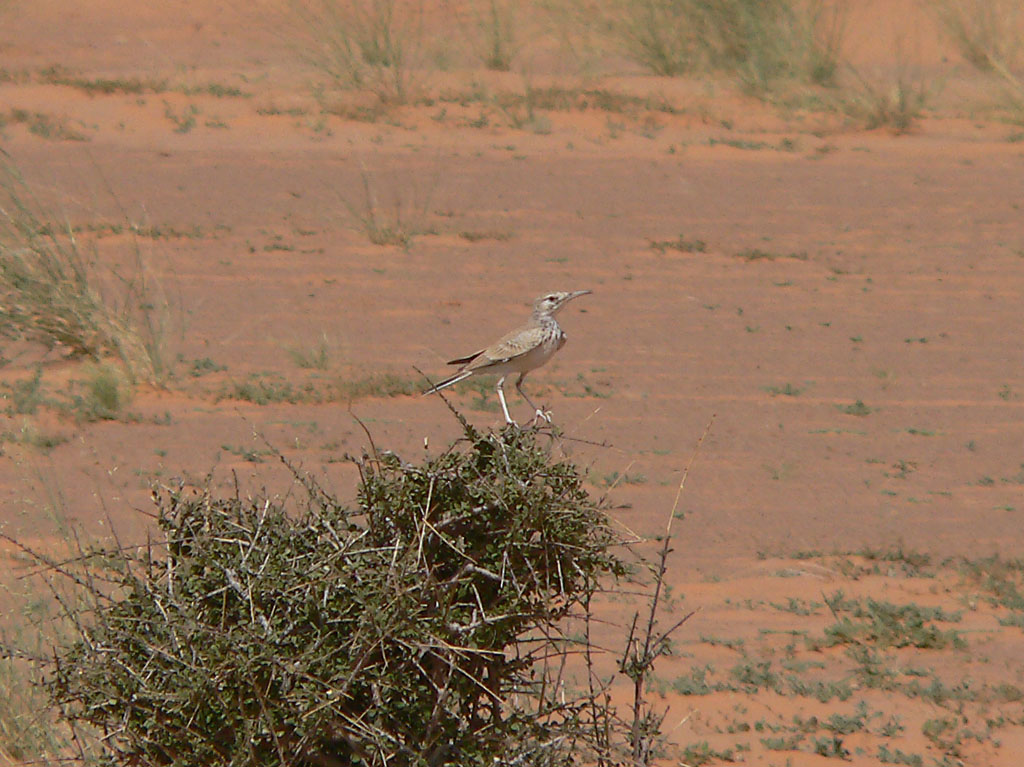
Perched on a bush (Mauritania)

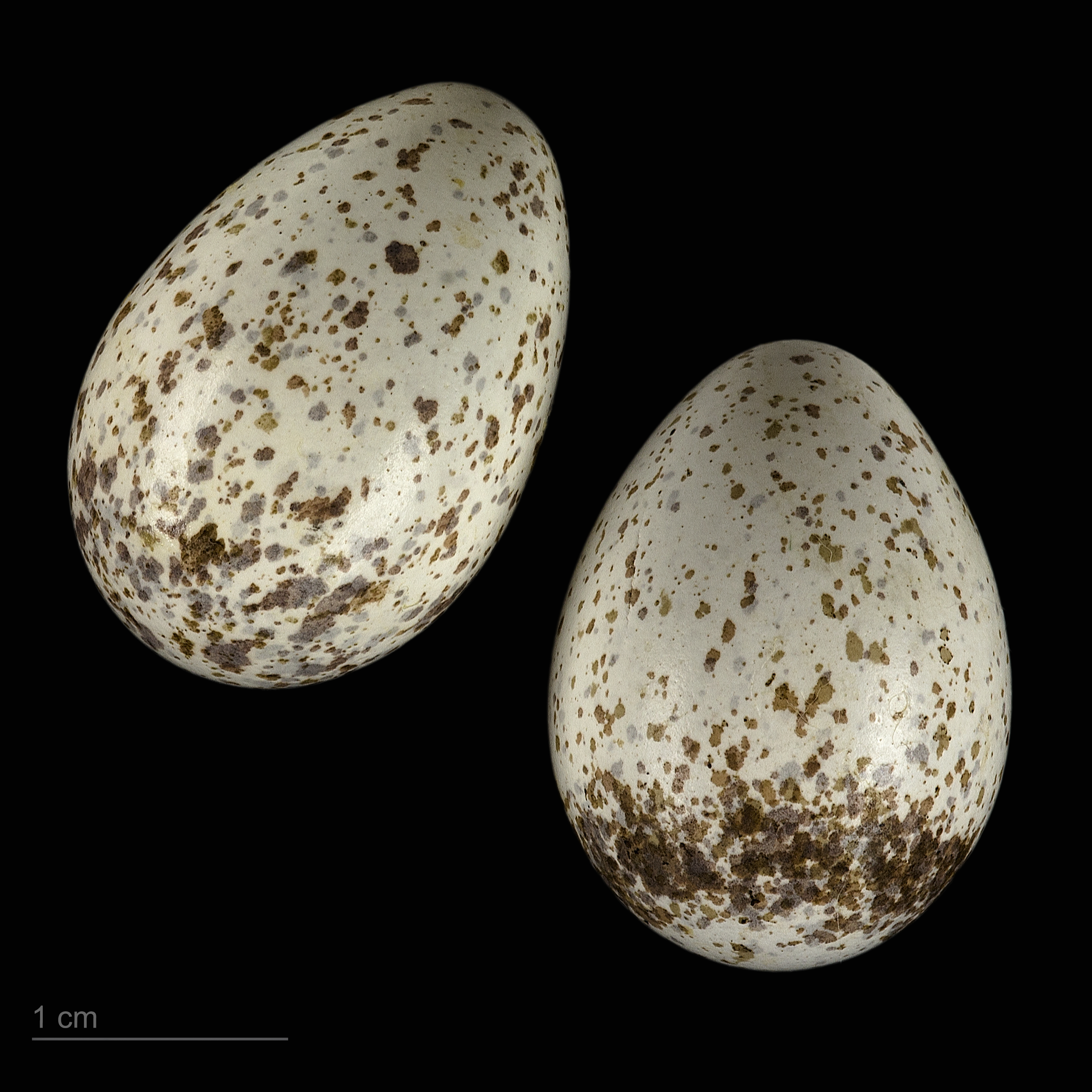
Eggs of Alaemon alaudipes alaudipes
