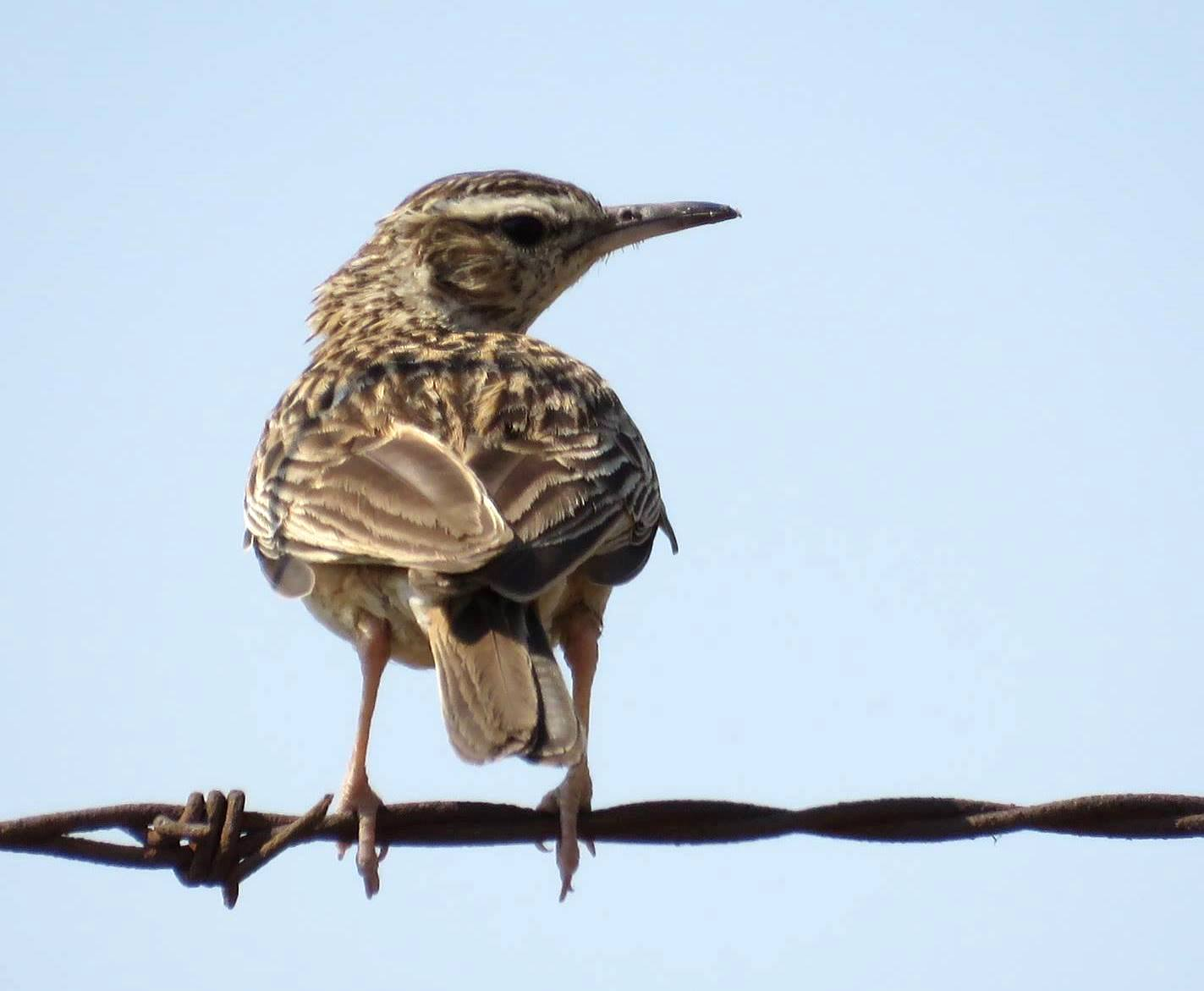
- In Limpopo, South Africa

Conservation status
- Least Concern (IUCN 3.1)

Scientific classification
- Kingdom: Animalia
- Phylum: Chordata
- Class: Aves
- Order: Passeriformes
- Family: Alaudidae
- Genus: Certhilauda
- Species: C. chuana

Binomial name
- Certhilauda chuana (Smith, 1836)
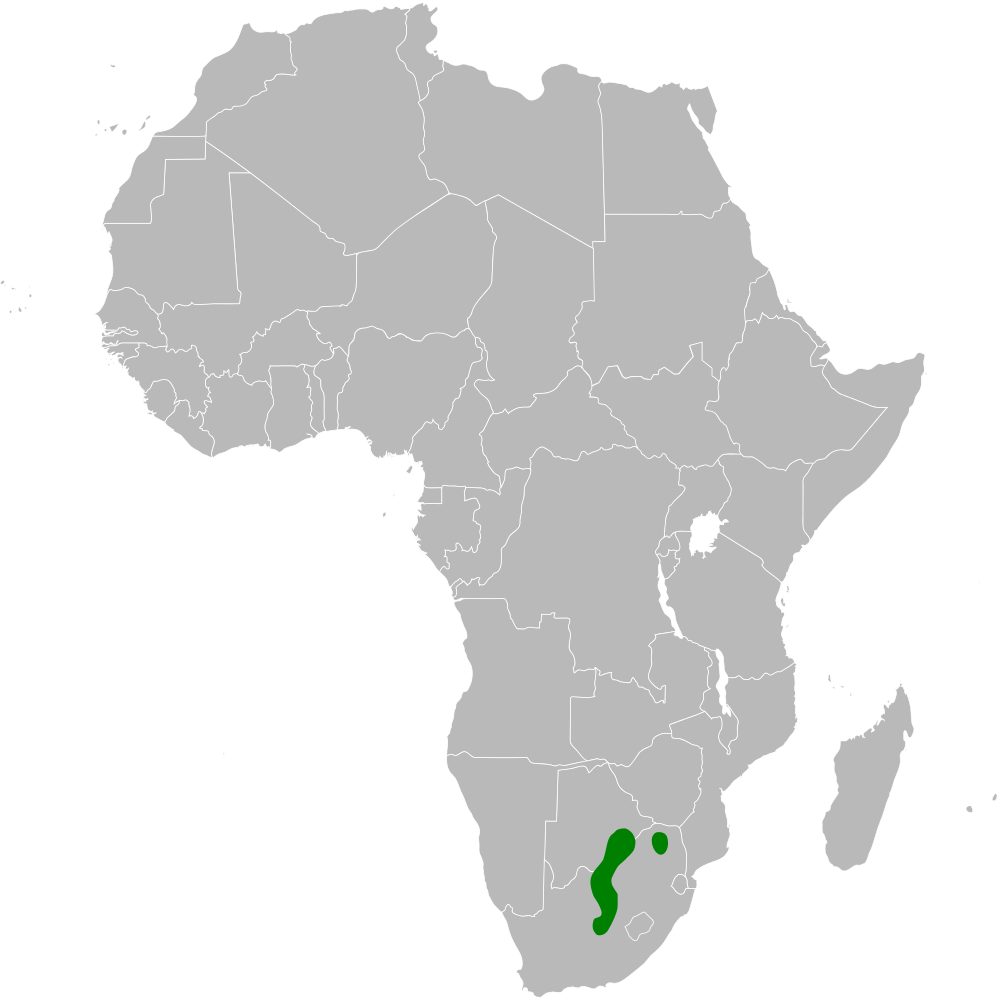

Synonyms
- Alauda chuana; Certhilauda breviunguis; Heterocorys breviunguis; Mirafra chuana

= Short-clawed lark =

Species of bird

The short-clawed lark (Certhilauda chuana) or short-clawed bush-lark, is a species of lark in the family Alaudidae. It is found in Botswana and South Africa. Its natural habitat is dry savannah.

== Taxonomy and systematics ==
Originally, the short-clawed lark was classified as belonging to the genus Alauda and then Mirafra until moved to Calendulauda. Not all authorities recognize this re-classification from Mirafra.

== Behaviour and ecology ==
The species lays clutches of two or three eggs (average clutch sizes in two studies 2.27-2.75 eggs). The incubation lasts for around 15 days, the longest of any African lark species. After fledging, chicks remain with their parents for 6–8 weeks. There is some variation in nesting strategies in the species, with the eastern population (in South Africa) having numerous broods per breeding season and the western population (in Botswana) breeding once per season. It is an insectivore.

== Gallery ==
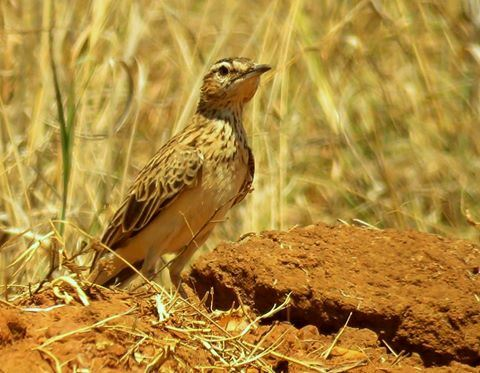
At Polokwane (Pietersburg), South Africa

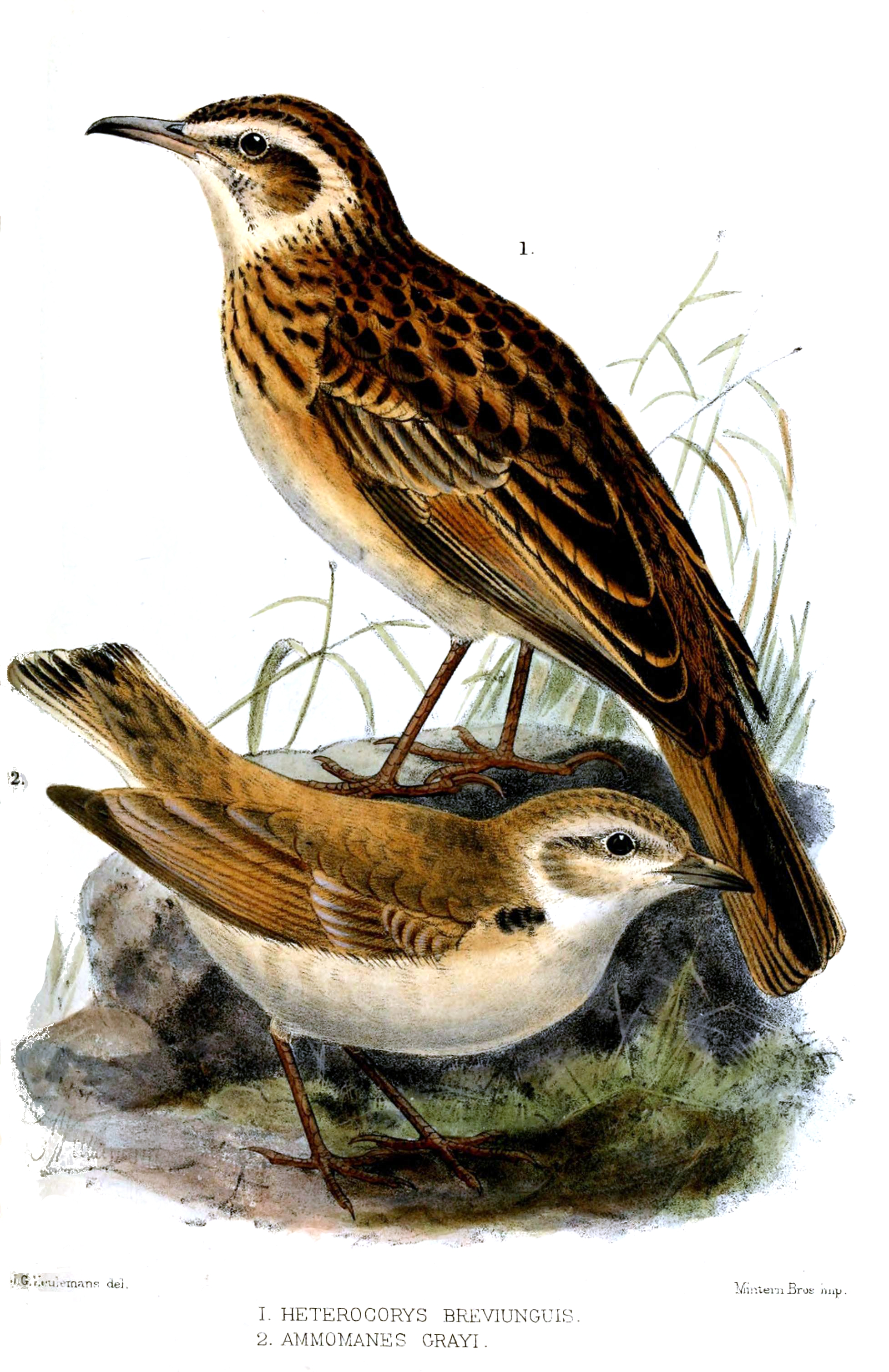
Illustration by Keulemans of C. chuana (above) and A. grayi (below)
