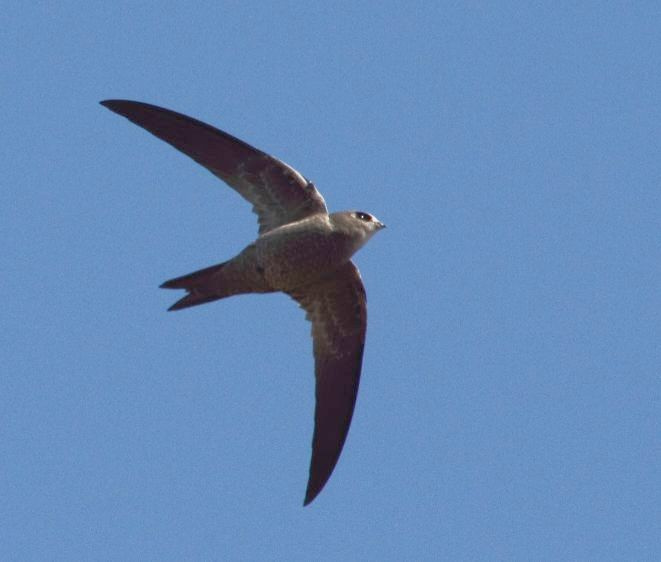
- Flying in Northern Cape, South Africa

Conservation status
- Least Concern (IUCN 3.1)

Scientific classification
- Kingdom: Animalia
- Phylum: Chordata
- Class: Aves
- Order: Apodiformes
- Family: Apodidae
- Genus: Apus
- Species: A. bradfieldi

Binomial name
- Apus bradfieldi (Roberts, 1926)

= Bradfield's swift =

Species of bird

Bradfield's swift (Apus bradfieldi) is a species of swift in the family Apodidae.

It is found in Angola, Botswana, Namibia, and South Africa.

The common name and Latin binomial commemorate the South African naturalist R. D. Bradfield (1882–1949).
