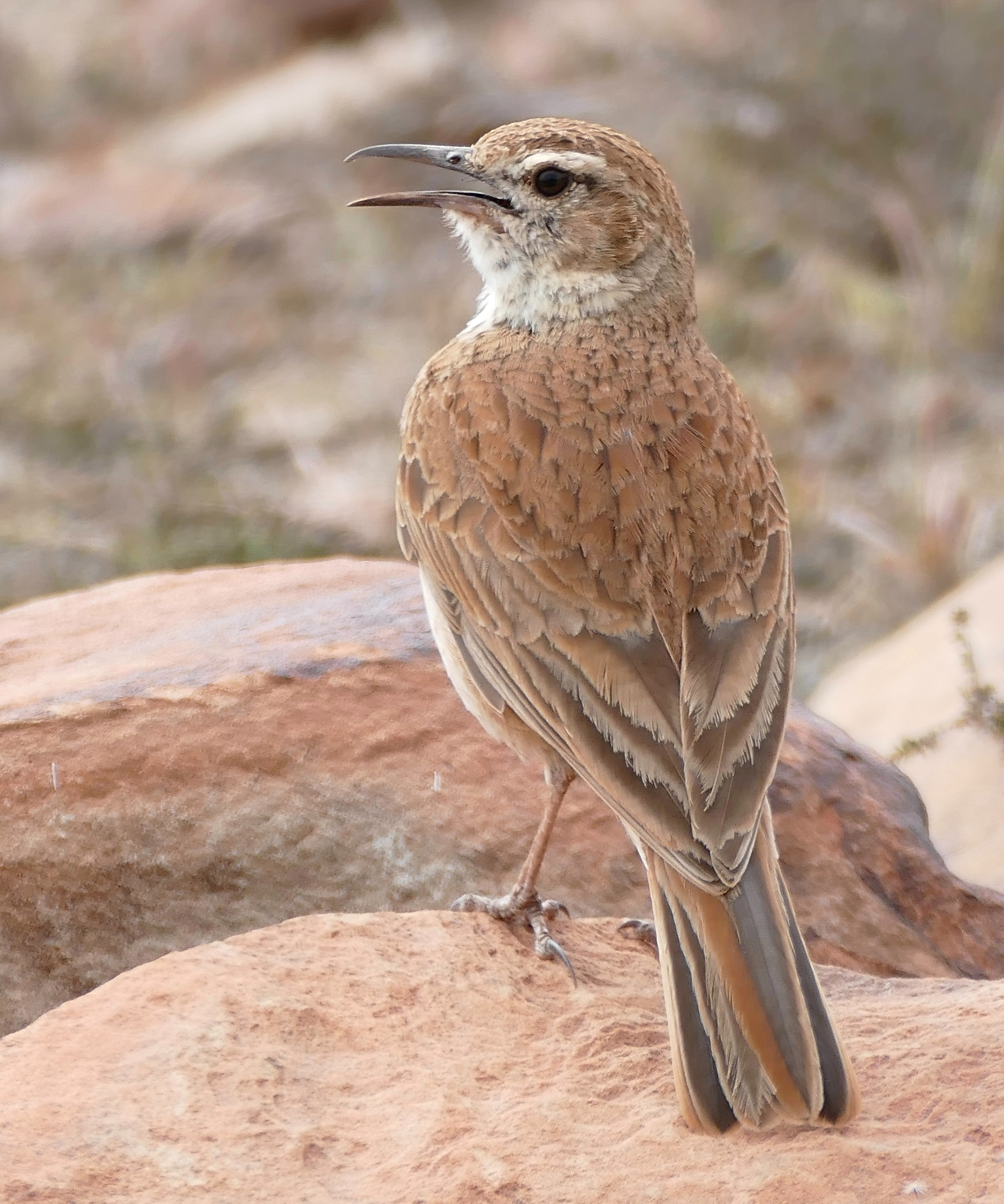
- An Eastern long-billed lark (C. semitorquata) in South Africa

Scientific classification
- Kingdom: Animalia
- Phylum: Chordata
- Class: Aves
- Order: Passeriformes
- Family: Alaudidae
- Genus: Certhilauda; Swainson, 1827

Type species
- Alauda curvirostris Hermann, 1783

Species
- 6, see text
- Range of the genus

= Certhilauda =

Genus of birds

Certhilauda is a genus of larks in the family Alaudidae living in the southern regions of Africa. The genus was formerly named Heterocorys.

== Taxonomy ==
The genus Certhilauda was introduced in 1827 by the English zoologist William Swainson. He specified the type species as "L'Alouette Sirli" of the French naturalist François Levaillant. This is Alauda curvirostris, the Cape long-billed lark, described by the French naturalist Johann Hermann in 1783. The genus name is a portmanteau of the genera Certhia for treecreepers and Alauda for the larks, both of which were named in 1758 by Carl Linnaeus.

=== Extant species ===
The genus contains four species:

Image	Common name	Scientific name
	Short-clawed lark	Certhilauda chuana
	Karoo long-billed lark	Certhilauda subcoronata
	Eastern long-billed lark	Certhilauda semitorquata
	Cape long-billed lark	Certhilauda curvirostris (includes the Agulhas long-billed lark)

=== Former species ===
Some authorities, either presently or formerly, recognised several additional species or subspecies as belonging to the genus Certhilauda, including:

- Greater hoopoe-lark (as the bifasciated lark, Certhilauda desertorum)
- Eastern greater hoopoe-lark (as Certhilauda doriae)
- Spike-heeled lark (as Certhilauda albofasciata)
- Spike-heeled lark (kalahariae) (as Certhilauda kalahariae)
- Spike-heeled lark (garrula) (as Certhilauda garrula)
- Rufous-rumped lark (as Certhilauda erythropygia)
- Karoo lark (as Certhilauda albescens)
- Red lark (as Certhilauda burra, Certhilauda erythroclamys or Certhilauda harei)
- Dune lark (as Certhilauda erythrochlamys)
- Barlow's lark (as Certhilauda barlowi)
- Somali lark (as Certhilauda somalica)
