= R. D. Bradfield =

South African farmer and naturalist

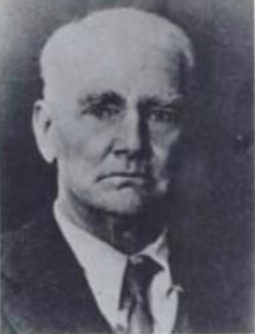
- Scientific career
- Fields: Ornithology, Botany

Rupert Dudley Bradfield (7 December 1876, Queenstown – 2 September 1949, Johannesburg) was a farmer and naturalist from southern Africa. He sent several specimens of birds and plants (mainly spermatophytes) from Waterberg Plateau (Namibia) and Namib desert to museums in United Kingdom and South Africa. Many species of birds, reptiles and plant names commemorate him. Several of his plant collections were from his farm near Okahandja and later on upon his return to South Africa, from Benoni. He is commemorated in several bird species, including Bradfield's swift, Bradfield's hornbill and Bradfield's lark. His record of a male red phalarope in winter plumage from his farm in Okahandja in April 1924 sent to the Transvaal Museum was recorded as "the first record of any phalarope from Africa" by the museum director Austin Roberts.
