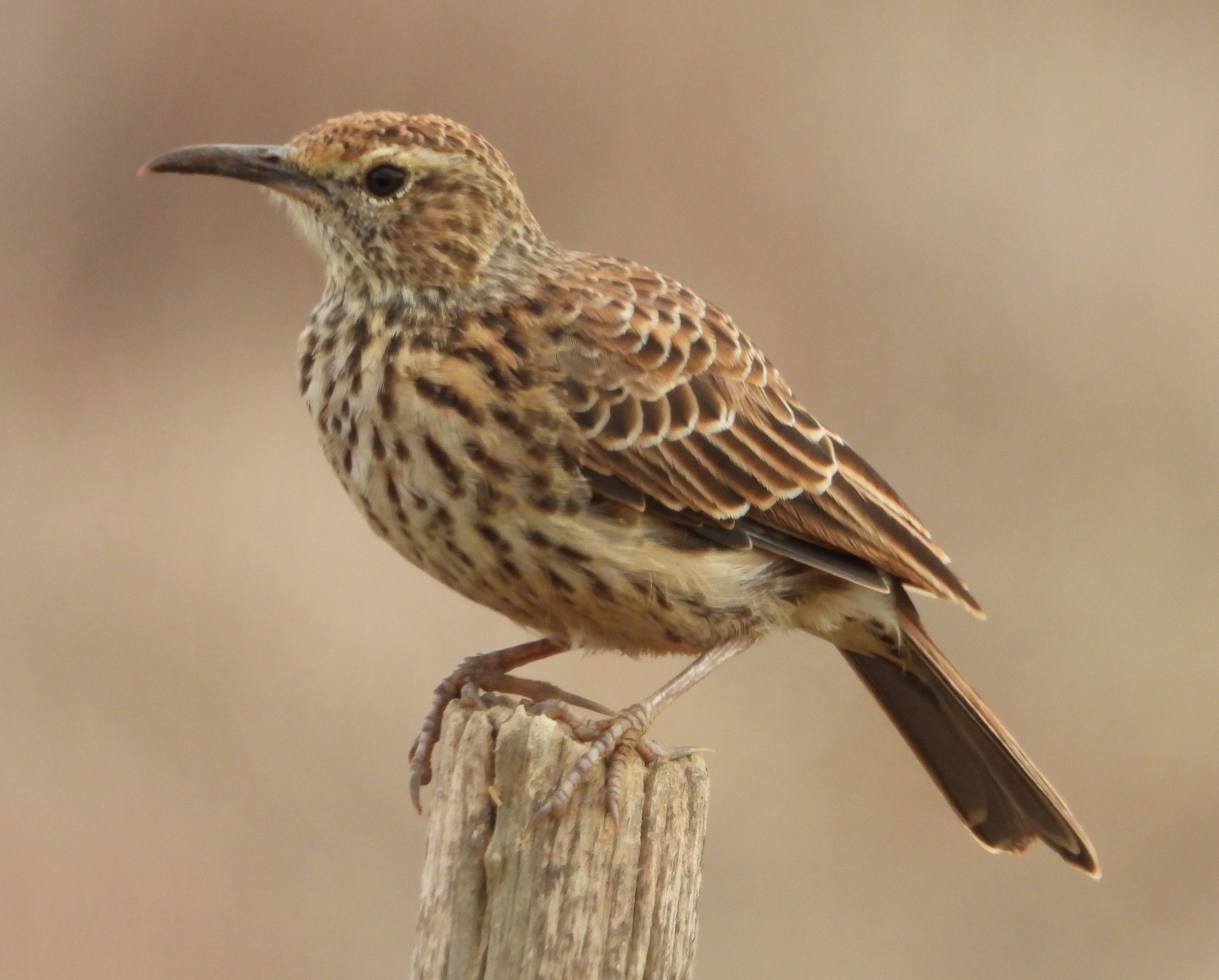

Conservation status
- Least Concern (IUCN 3.1)

Scientific classification
- Kingdom: Animalia
- Phylum: Chordata
- Class: Aves
- Order: Passeriformes
- Family: Alaudidae
- Genus: Certhilauda
- Species: C. curvirostris

Binomial name
- Certhilauda curvirostris (Hermann, 1783)

Subspecies
- See text
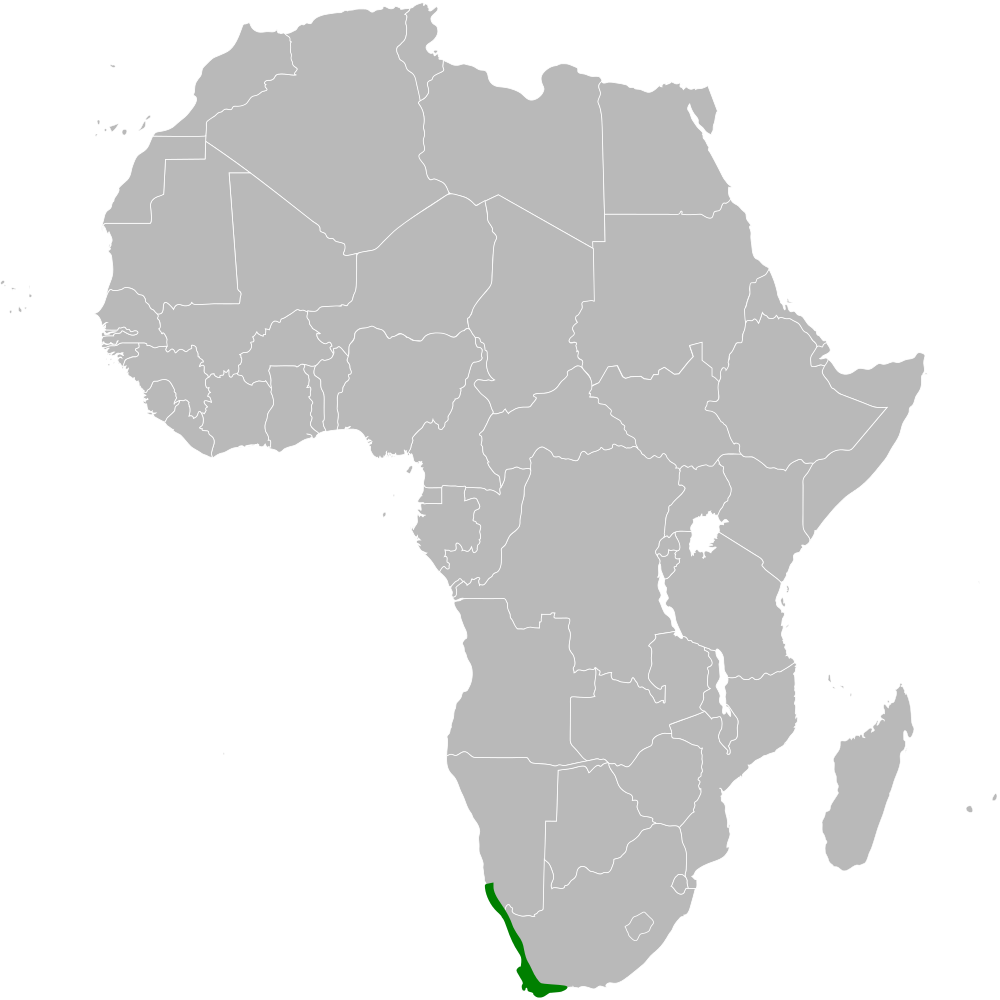

Synonyms
- Alauda curvirostris

= Cape long-billed lark =

Species of bird

The Cape long-billed lark (Certhilauda curvirostris), also known as the Cape lark, Cape longbill or long-billed lark is a species of lark in the family Alaudidae. It is found in south-western Africa. Its natural habitats are semi-arid Karoo shrub and subtropical dry shrubland and subtropical or dry lowland and highveld grassland. This lark is also found in croplands, farmlands and coastal fynbos.

== Taxonomy ==
The Cape long-billed lark was formally described in 1783 by the French naturalist Johann Hermann under the binomial name Alauda curvirostris. The specific epithet combines the Latin curvus meaning "curved" or "bent" with -rostris meaning "-billed", from rostrum meaning "beak". Hermann based his account of "Le Sirli" from the Cape of Good Hope area of South Africa that had been described in 1778 by the French polymath, the Comte de Buffon in his book Histoire Naturelle des Oiseaux. An engraving by François-Nicolas Martinet was published to accompany Buffon's account. The Cape long-billed lark is now one of five larks placed in the genus Certhilauda that was introduced in 1827 by the English zoologist William Swainson.

Three subspecies are recognised:

- C. c. falcirostris Reichenow, 1916 – southwest Namibia to west South Africa
- C. c. curvirostris (Hermann, 1783) – southwest South Africa
- C. c. brevirostris Roberts, 1941 – south South Africa (Agulhas long-billed lark)

The subspecies C. c. brevirostris has sometimes been treated as a separate species, the Agulhas long-billed lark. Additionally, some authorities consider several other species to be either presently or formerly as subspecies of the Cape long-billed lark:

- Karoo long-billed lark (as C. c. damarensis, C. c. bradshawi, C. c. subcoronata and C. c. gilli).
- Benguela long-billed lark (as C. c. benguelensis)
- Eastern long-billed lark (as C. c. semitorquata).
