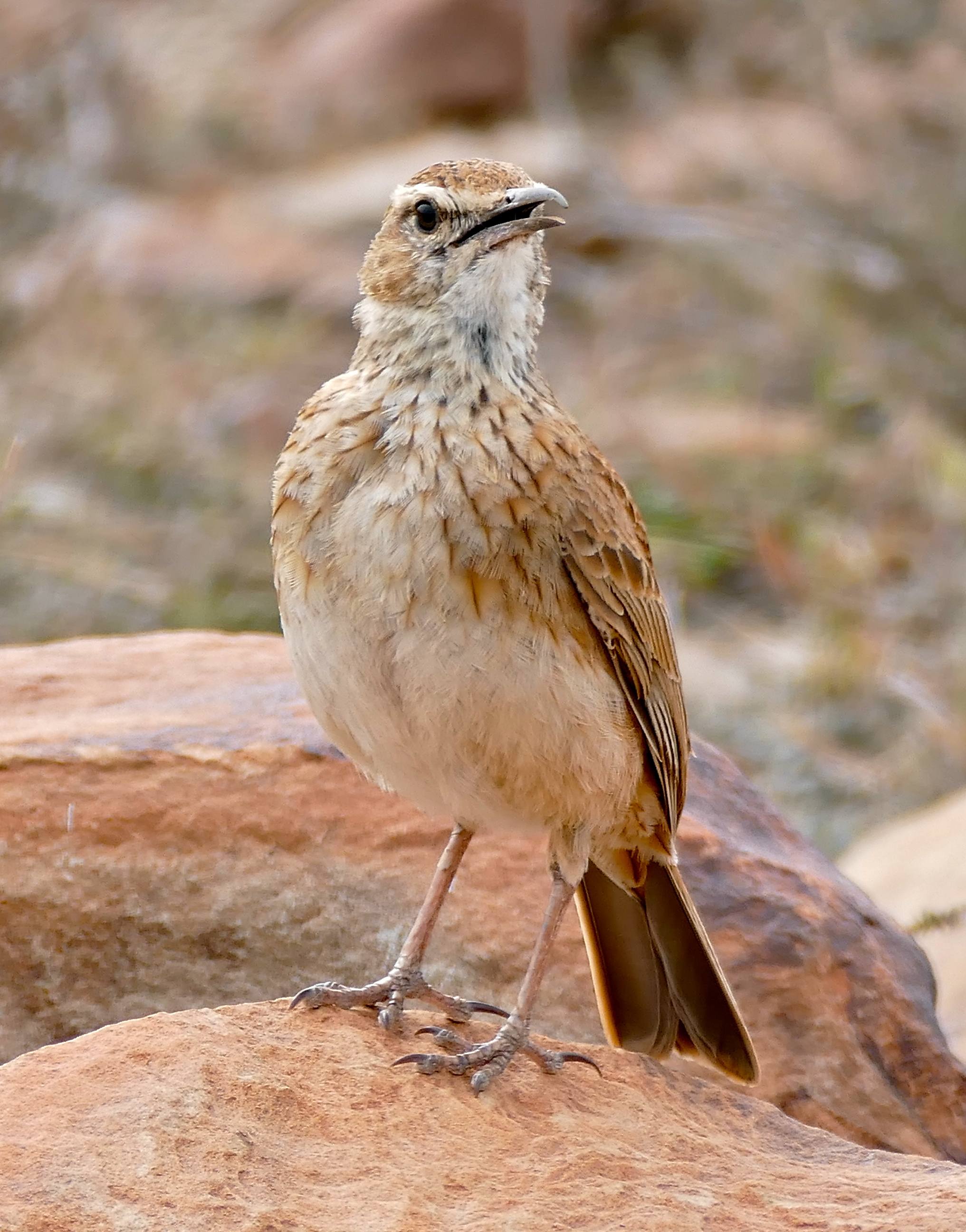
- Singing adult in Mountain Zebra N.P., Eastern Cape, South Africa

Conservation status
- Least Concern (IUCN 3.1)

Scientific classification
- Kingdom: Animalia
- Phylum: Chordata
- Class: Aves
- Order: Passeriformes
- Family: Alaudidae
- Genus: Certhilauda
- Species: C. semitorquata

Binomial name
- Certhilauda semitorquata Smith, 1836

Subspecies
- See text
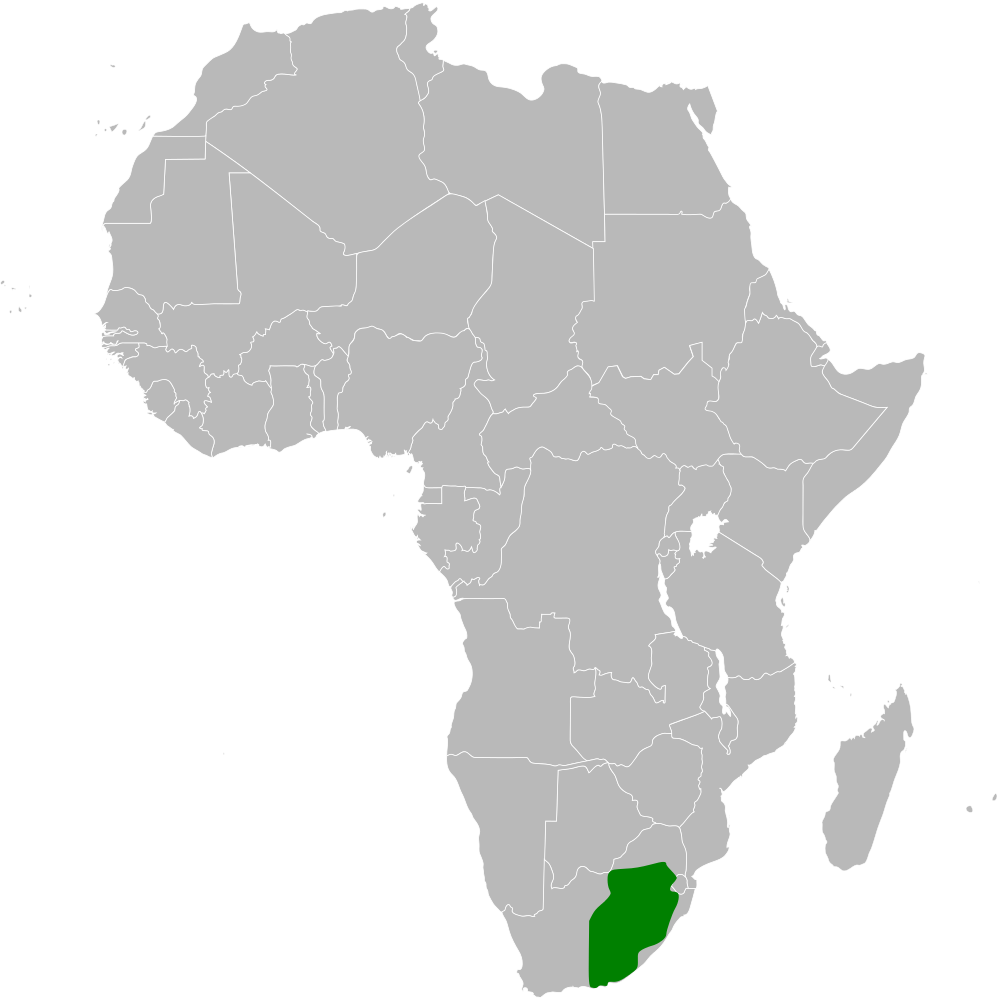

Synonyms
- Certhilauda curvirostris semitorquata; Certhilauda longirostris

= Eastern long-billed lark =

Species of bird

The eastern long-billed lark (Certhilauda semitorquata), also known as the Kaffrarian long-billed lark or Eastern longbill, is a species of lark in the family Alaudidae. It is found in south-eastern Africa. Its natural habitat is subtropical or tropical dry lowland grassland.

== Taxonomy and systematics ==
=== Subspecies ===
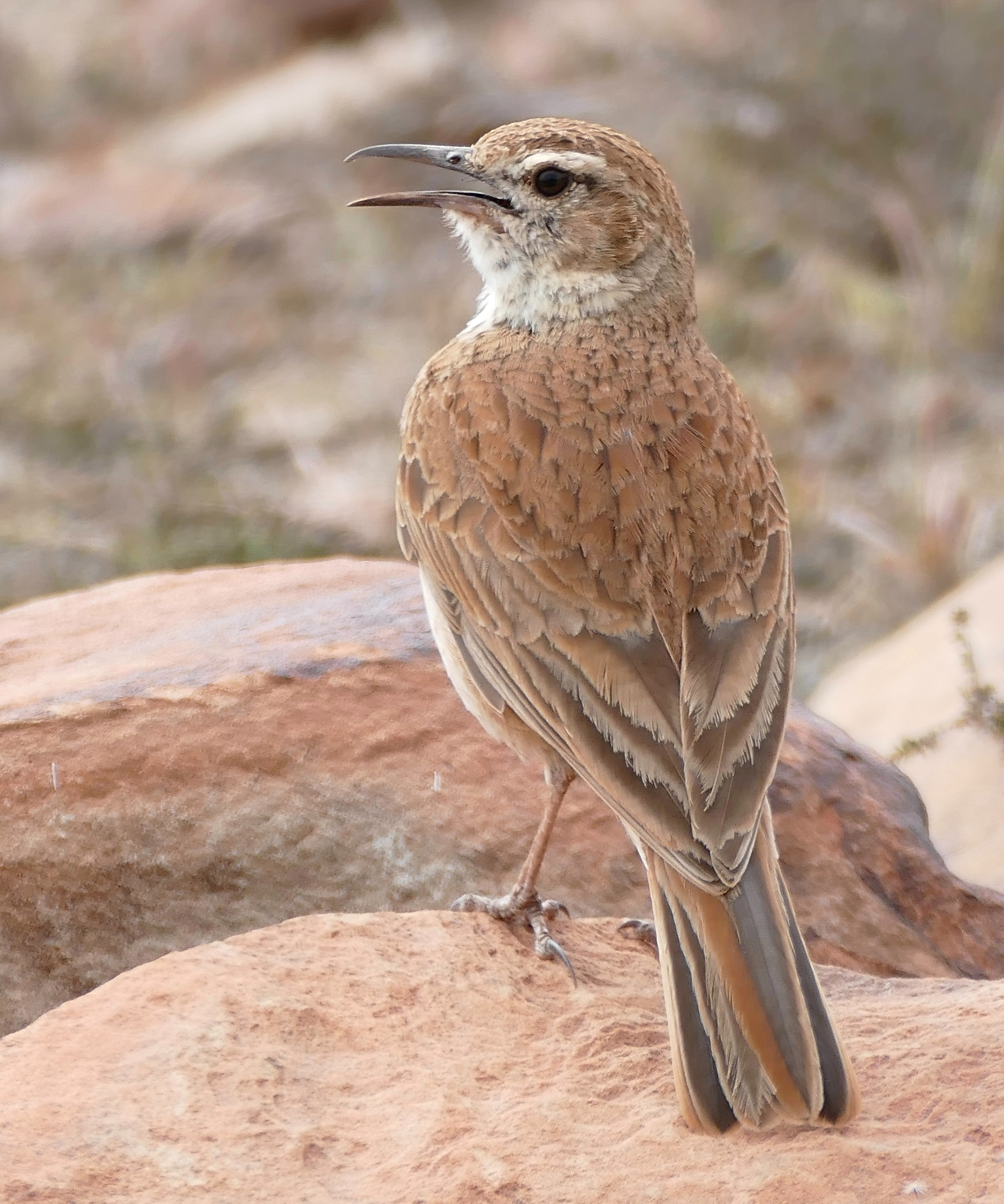
Upperparts of C. s. algida in worn plumage

Three subspecies are recognized:

- C. s. transvaalensis - Roberts, 1936: Found in eastern South Africa
- C. s. semitorquata - Smith, 1836: Found in central South Africa
- C. s. algida - Quickelberge, 1967: Found in south-eastern South Africa

Some authorities consider the eastern long-billed lark to be a subspecies of the Cape long-billed lark.
