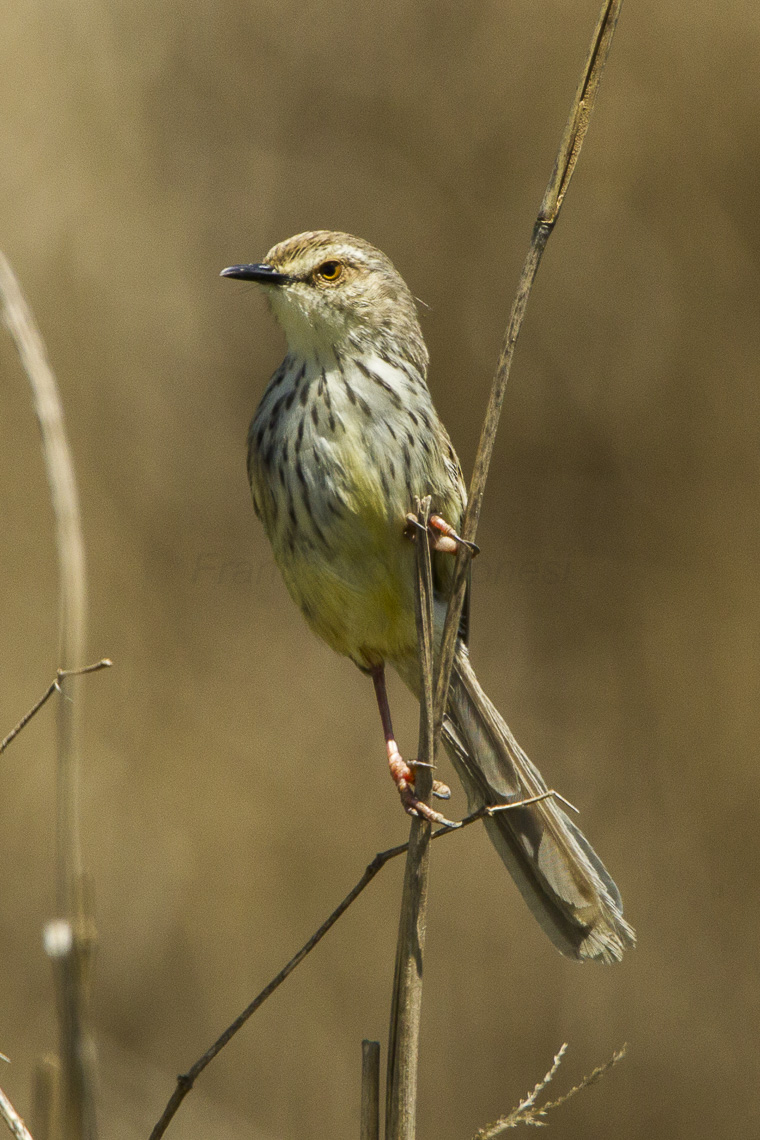

Conservation status
- Least Concern (IUCN 3.1)

Scientific classification
- Kingdom: Animalia
- Phylum: Chordata
- Class: Aves
- Order: Passeriformes
- Family: Cisticolidae
- Genus: Prinia
- Species: P. hypoxantha

Binomial name
- Prinia hypoxantha (Sharpe, 1877)

= Drakensberg prinia =

Species of bird

The Drakensberg prinia or saffron-breasted prinia (Prinia hypoxantha) is a small passerine bird. It lives in eastern South Africa and Eswatini.

It lives in the Drakensberg's forest edges, wooded gullies and bracken covered slopes. The Drakensberg prinia was formerly considered to be a subspecies P. m. hypoxantha of the Karoo prinia, P. maculosa.

== Description ==
The Drakensberg prinia is 12–14 cm (4.7–5.5 in) long, with short rounded wings, a longish tail, strong legs and a short straight black bill. The head has a whitish eyebrow and the upperparts are otherwise brown. The throat and lower face are whitish with no streaking and the rest of the underparts are yellowish with dark streaking. The long tail has a dark spot near the end and is typically cocked up at an angle. The feet and legs are pinkish-brown, and the eye is pale. The sexes are identical, but juveniles are paler below than the adults.

The calls of this species include a sharp chleet-chleet-chleet-chleet-chleet-chleet, and a fast buzzy tit-tit-tit-tit-tit.

The Drakensberg prinia can only be confused with the closely related Karoo prinia, but that species has less yellow underparts with heavier spotting.

== Behaviour ==
The Drakensberg prinia builds a thin-walled oval nest with a side entrance from green grass. It is well hidden deep inside a leafy shrub or bush.

The Drakensberg prinia is usually seen in pairs or small groups, typically low in scrub, but sometimes perching on the top of a bush. It actively forages for small insects, with tail cocked and frequently swung side-to-side.

== Conservation status ==
This common species has a large range, with an estimated extent of 50,000-100,000 km². The population size is believed to be large, and the species is not believed to approach the thresholds for the population decline criterion of the IUCN Red List (i.e. declining more than 30% in ten years or three generations). For these reasons, the species is evaluated as least concern.

== Gallery ==
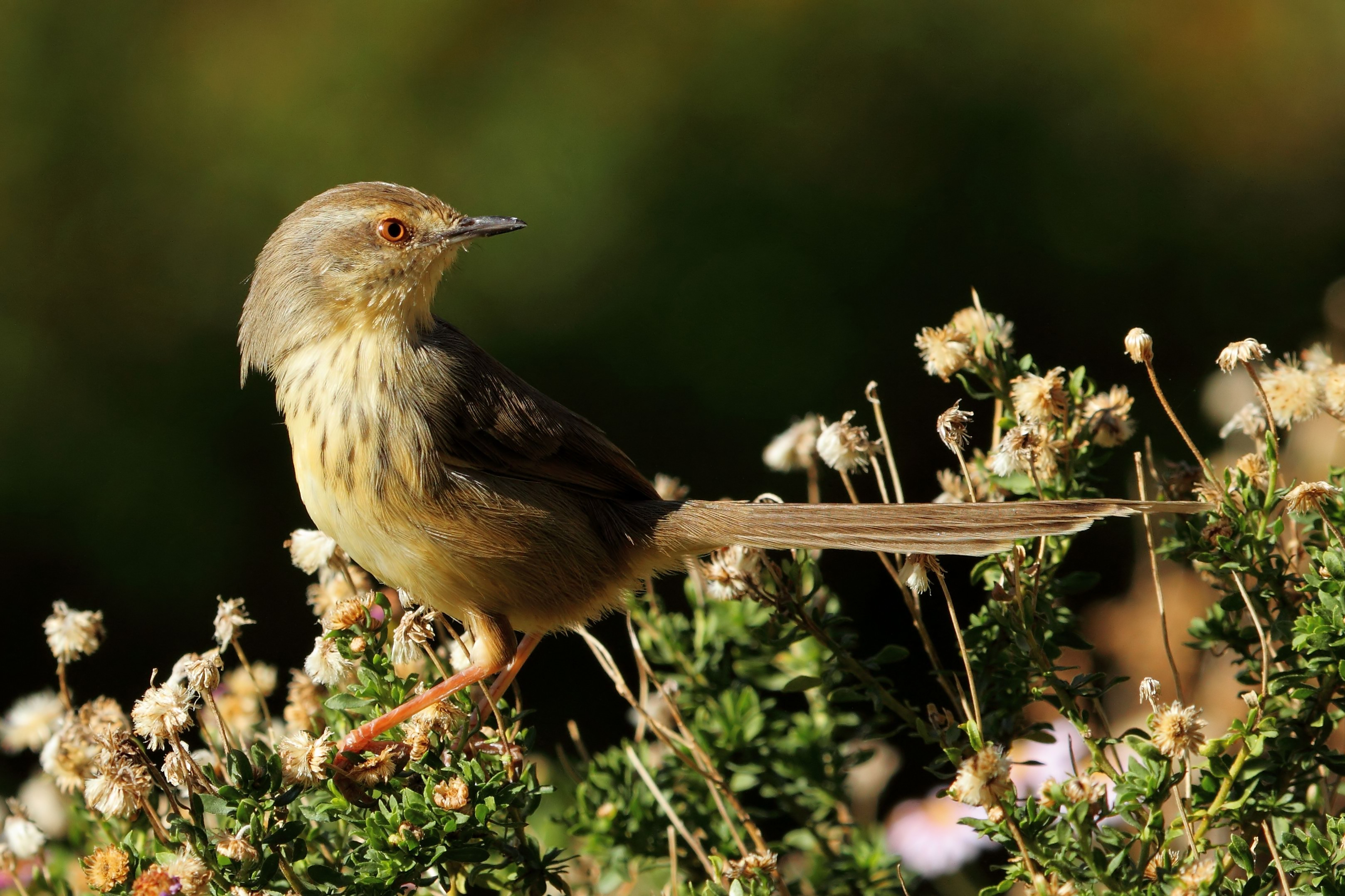

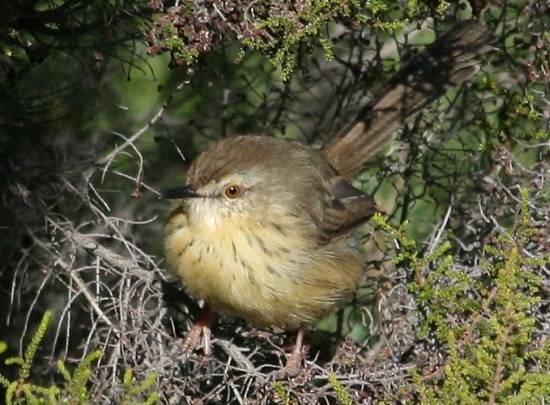

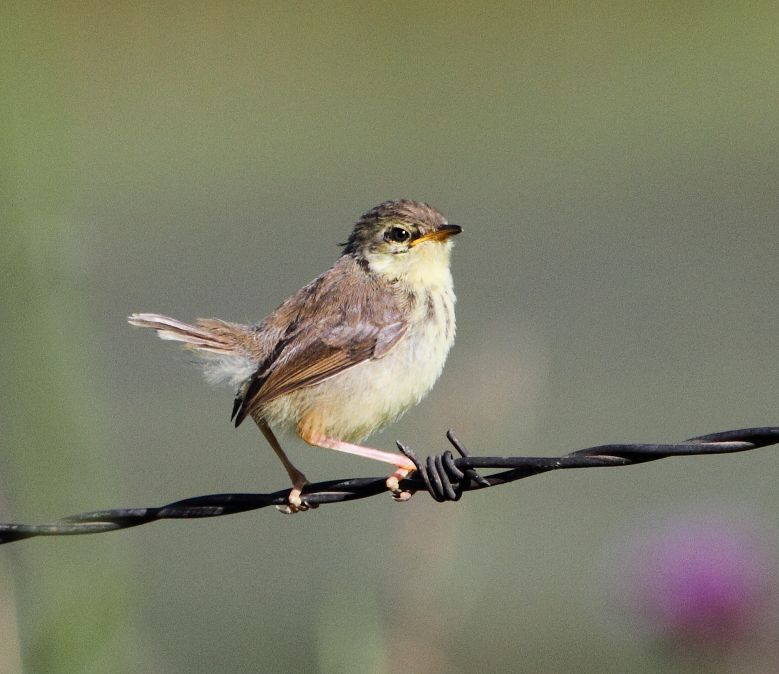

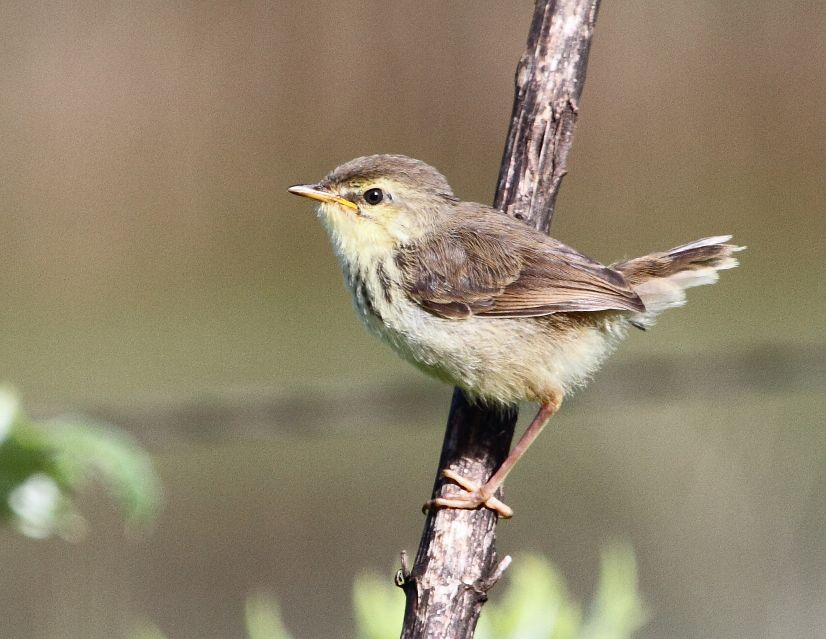
