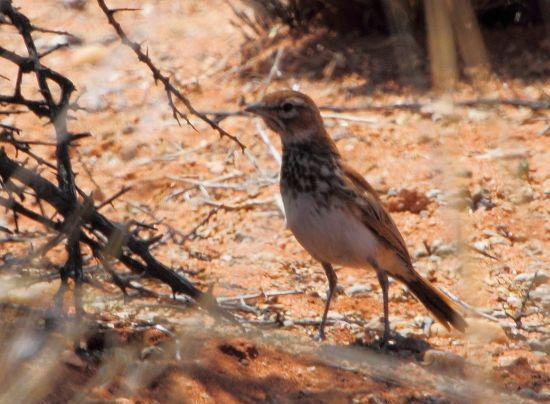
- In Northern Cape, South Africa

Conservation status
- Vulnerable (IUCN 3.1)

Scientific classification
- Kingdom: Animalia
- Phylum: Chordata
- Class: Aves
- Order: Passeriformes
- Family: Alaudidae
- Genus: Calendulauda
- Species: C. burra

Binomial name
- Calendulauda burra (Bangs, 1930)
- IUCN distribution of the Red lark Extant (resident)
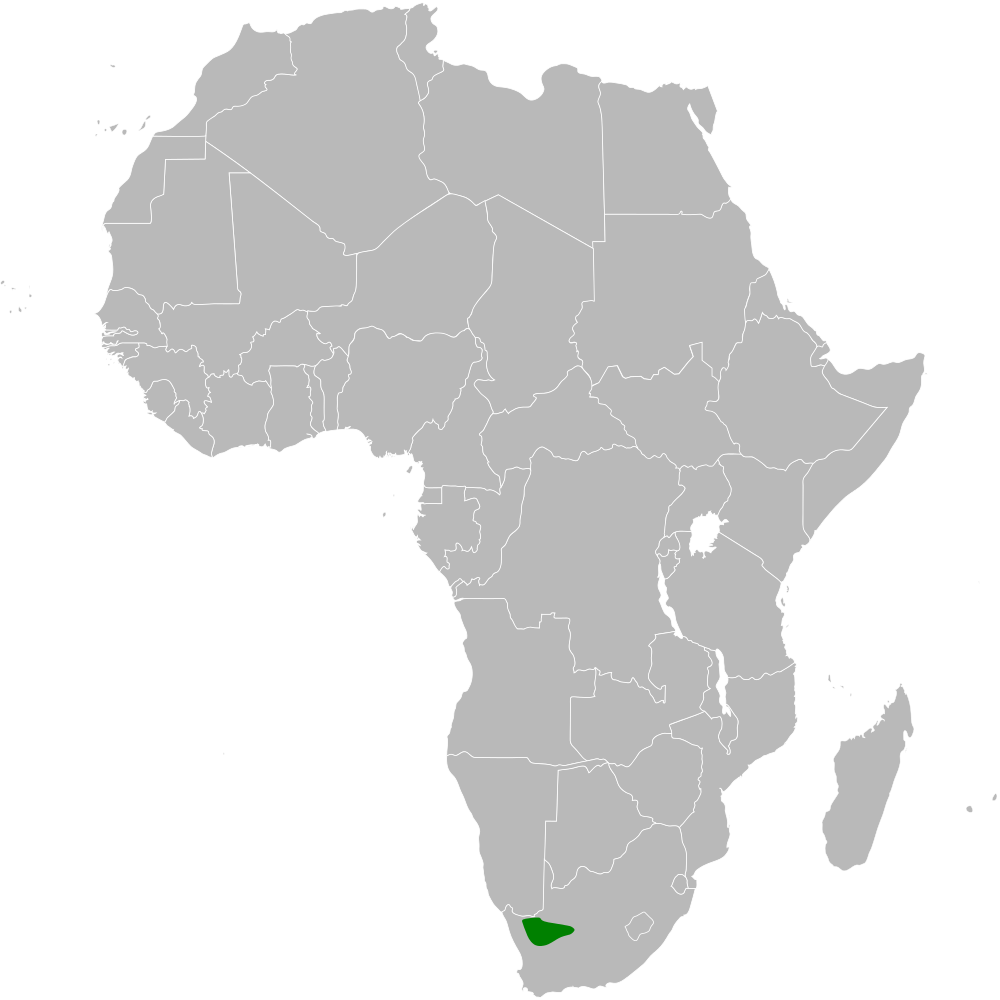

Synonyms
- Ammomanes burra; Ammomanes burrus; Certhilauda burra; Certhilauda erythroclamys; Certhilauda harei; Mirafra burra

= Red lark =

Species of bird

The red lark (Calendulauda burra), also known as the ferruginous lark or ferruginous sand-lark, is a species of lark in the family Alaudidae. It is found in western South Africa and possibly Namibia. Its natural habitats are subtropical or tropical dry shrubland and subtropical or tropical dry lowland grassland. It is threatened by habitat loss and climate change.

== Taxonomy and systematics ==
Originally, the red lark was classified as belonging to the genus Ammomanes, then later by Mirafra and Certhilauda, until moved to Calendulauda in 2009. Not all authorities recognise each of these re-classifications.
