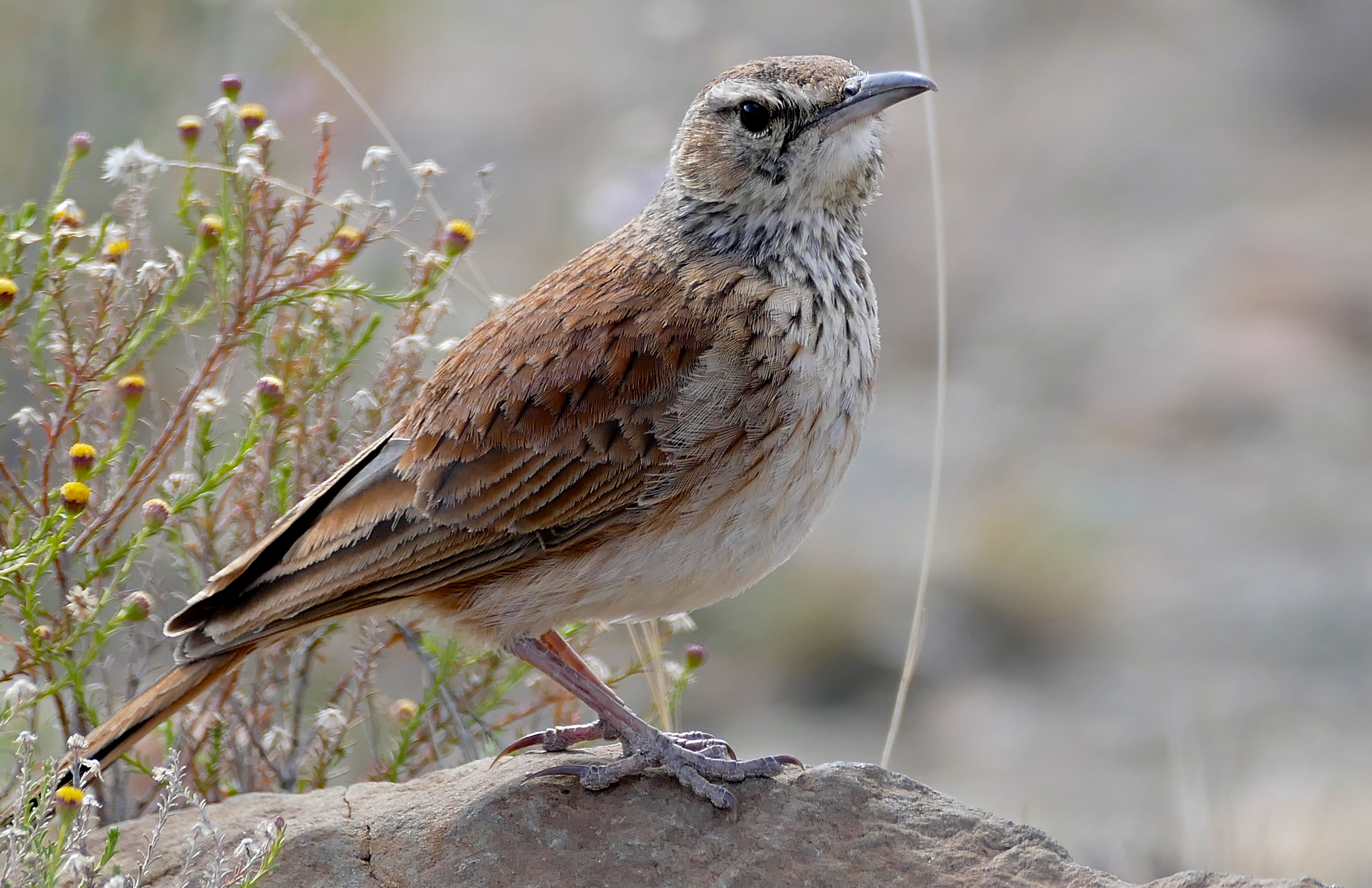
- C. s. gilli in Mountain Zebra N. P.

Conservation status
- Least Concern (IUCN 3.1)

Scientific classification
- Kingdom: Animalia
- Phylum: Chordata
- Class: Aves
- Order: Passeriformes
- Family: Alaudidae
- Genus: Certhilauda
- Species: C. subcoronata

Binomial name
- Certhilauda subcoronata Smith, 1843

Subspecies
- See text
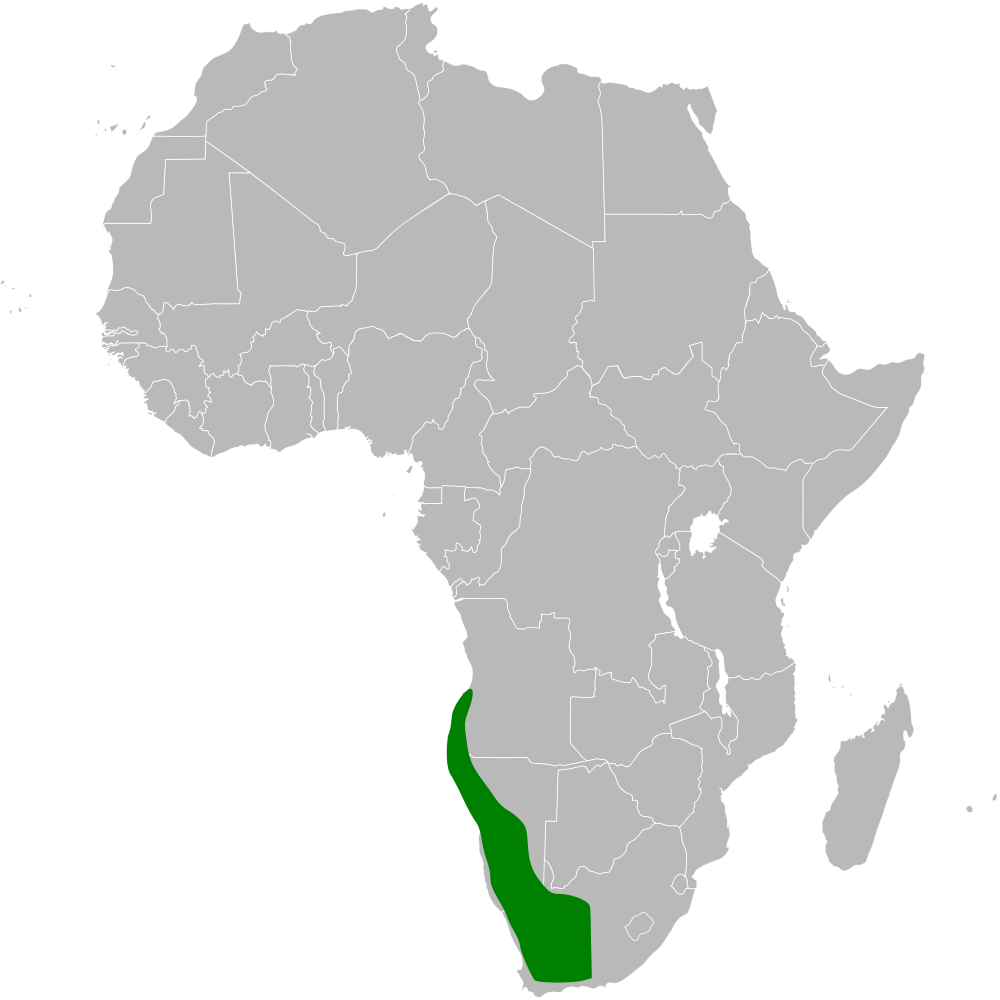
- Range (only up to central Namibia)

= Karoo long-billed lark =

Species of bird

The Karoo long-billed lark (Certhilauda subcoronata) or Karoo longbill is a species of lark in the family Alaudidae. It is found in southern Africa in its natural habitat of subtropical or tropical dry shrubland.

== Taxonomy and systematics ==
Previously, the Karoo long-billed lark was considered by some authorities to comprise several subspecies of the Cape long-billed lark.

=== Subspecies ===
Six subspecies are recognised:

- C. s. damarensis (Sharpe, RB, 1904) – west-central Namibia
- C. s. bradshawi (Sharpe, RB, 1904) – southern Namibia and northwestern South Africa (western Northern Cape)
- C. s. subcoronata Smith, A, 1843 – west-central South Africa, southward to central Karoo
- C. s. gilli Roberts, A, 1936 – south-central South Africa (southern Karoo)
- C. s. benguelensis (Sharpe, RB, 1904) – far coastal southwestern Angola and northern Namibia
- C. s. kaokoensis Bradfield, RD, 1944 – Brandberg Mountains (southern Angola and northern Namibia)

Subspecies C. s. benguelensis together with C. s. kaokoensis, have sometimes been treated as a separate species, the Benguela long-billed lark. The two taxa are considered to be subspecies of the Karoo long-billed lark based on the similar vocalization and the uncertain affinities of the intermediate taxon damarensis.

== Gallery ==
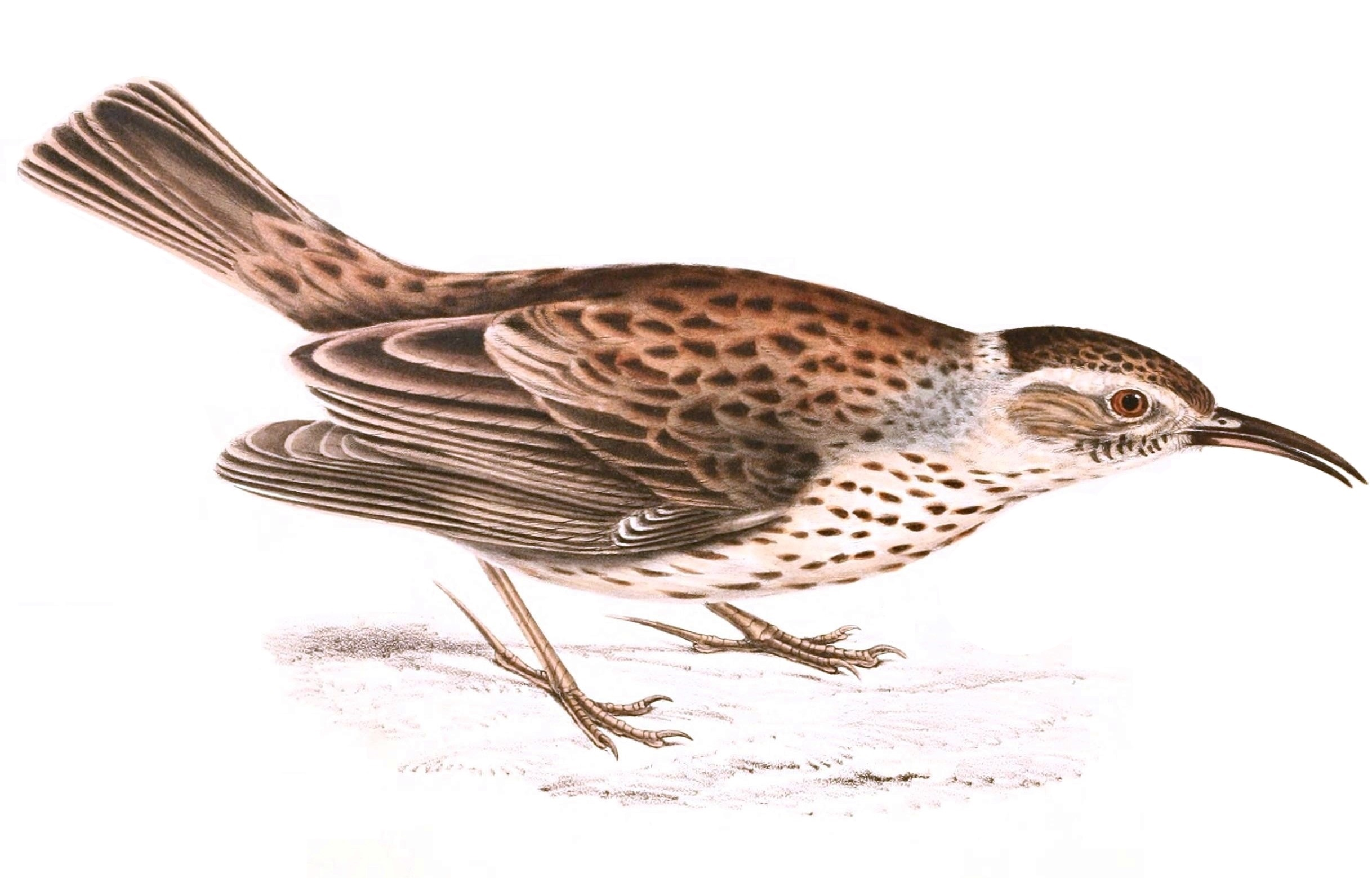
Nominate subspecies illustrated by Andrew Smith, 1838. Note the greyish collar, a field mark of the species.

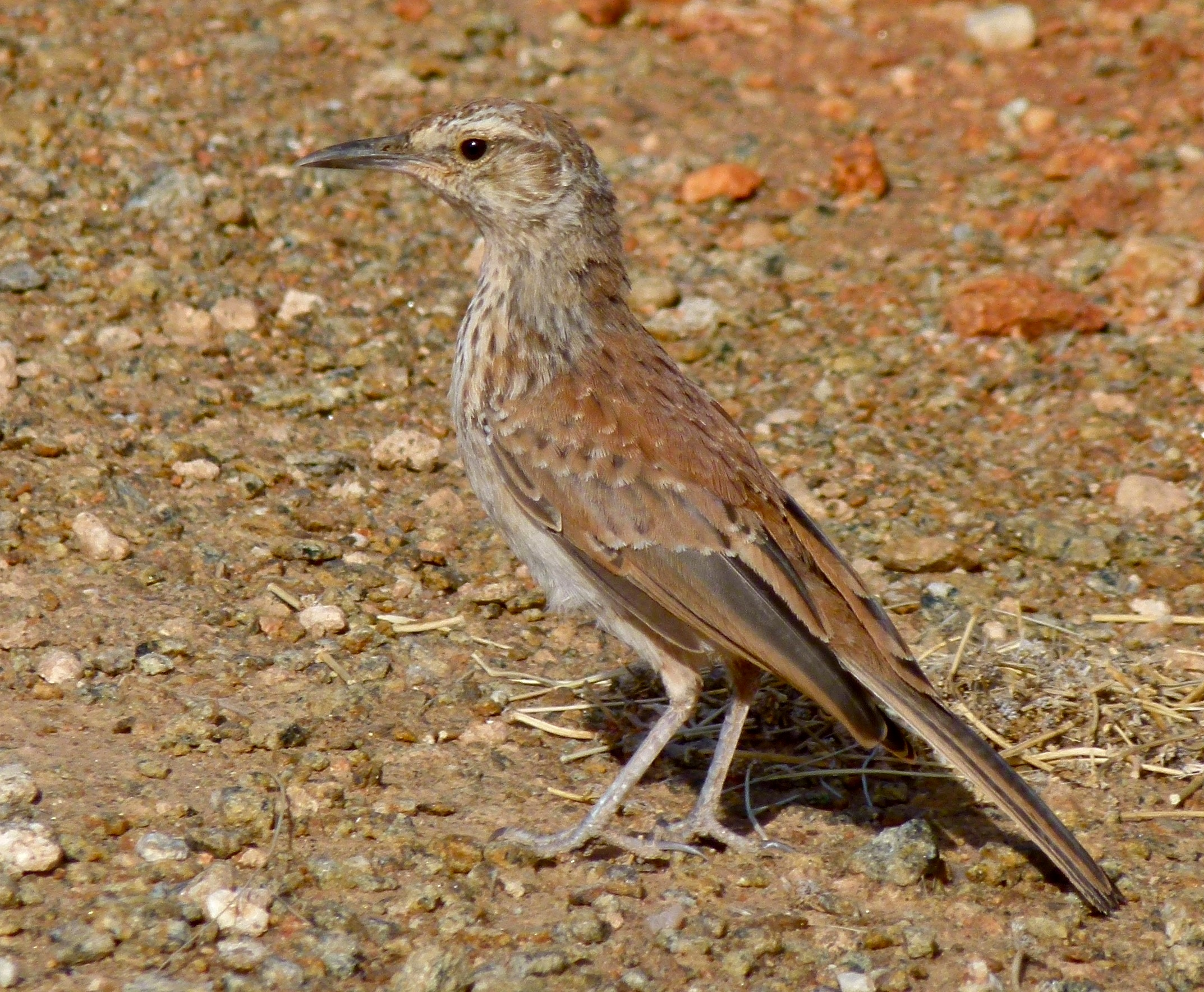
Immature subspecies C. s. bradshawi at Augrabies Falls
