= List of birds of Southern Africa =

This is a list of the bird species recorded in Southern Africa. Southern Africa is defined as Africa south of a line between the Kunene and Zambezi rivers, encompassing Namibia, Botswana, Zimbabwe, mainland South Africa, Lesotho, Eswatini and southern and central Mozambique, as well as oceanic waters within 200 nautical miles (370 km) of the coast, covering approximately 3.5 million square kilometres.

== Traditional boundaries ==
In Layard's 1867 treatise on the regional avifauna, he arbitrarily defined "South Africa" as the region south of 28° South. Sharpe's 1884 revision of Layard's work extended the boundary to the Cuanza and Zambezi rivers, believing that the latter is a natural avifaunal limit. Stark and Sclater, possibly influenced by national boundaries determined at the Berlin Conference, substituted the Cuanza with the Kunene River for the first of their volumes, which appeared in 1900. The latter definition became entrenched with many ornithological publications following suit.

== Regional habitats ==
Southern Africa consists of eight major habitats: the Karoo, moist savannah, arid savannah, the Namib Desert, lowland forest, fynbos, grassland and montane forest.

== Taxonomy ==
This list's taxonomic treatment (designation and sequence of orders, families and species) and nomenclature (common and scientific names) follow the conventions of Austin Roberts' Birds of Southern Africa 7th edition. The family accounts of the respective headers, and the species counts per family, reflect this taxonomy. Introduced, accidental, and extirpated species are included in the total species counts for Southern Africa.

The following tags have been used to highlight several categories, but not all species fall into one of these categories. Those that do not are commonly occurring native species.

- Accidental - a species that rarely or accidentally occurs in the Southern Africa
- Endemic - a species endemic to Southern Africa
- Extirpated - a species that no longer occurs in Southern Africa though populations exist elsewhere
- Introduced - a species introduced to Southern Africa as a direct or indirect consequence of human actions
- Data deficient - a species with uncertain status due to lack of research or available information

== Penguins ==
Order: Sphenisciformes Family: Spheniscidae

The number of penguin species is a matter of debate. Depending on the authority, biodiversity varies between 17 and 20 living species. Four species occur in Southern Africa, though only one is resident or a breeder.

- African penguin, Spheniscus demersus
- King penguin, Aptenodytes patagonicus - accidental
- Macaroni penguin, Eudyptes chrysolophus - accidental
- Rockhopper penguin, Eudyptes chrysocome - accidental

== Grebes ==
Order: Podicipediformes Family: Podicipedidae

Grebes are small to medium-large freshwater diving birds. They have lobed toes and are excellent swimmers and divers. However, they have their feet placed far back on the body, making them quite ungainly on land. There are 20 species worldwide and three species occur in Southern Africa.

- Little grebe, Tachybaptus ruficollis
- Great crested grebe, Podiceps cristatus
- Black-necked grebe, Podiceps nigricollis

== Albatrosses ==
Order: Procellariiformes Family: Diomedeidae

The albatrosses comprise between 13 and 24 species (the number of species is still a matter of some debate, 21 being the most commonly accepted number) in 4 genera. The four genera are the great albatrosses (Diomedea), the mollymawks (Thalassarche), the North Pacific albatrosses (Phoebastria), and the sooty albatrosses or sooties (Phoebetria). Of the four genera, the North Pacific albatrosses are considered a sister taxon to the great albatrosses, while the sooty albatrosses are considered closer to the mollymawks.

- Tristan albatross, Diomedea dabbenena
- Wandering albatross, Diomedea exulans
- Southern royal albatross, Diomedea epomophora
- Northern royal albatross, Diomedea sanfordi
- Shy albatross, Thalassarche cauta
- Black-browed albatross, Thalassarche melanophris
- Atlantic yellow-nosed albatross, Thalassarche chlororhynchos
- Grey-headed albatross, Thalassarche chrysostoma
- Salvin's albatross, Thalassarche salvini
- Chatham albatross, Thalassarche eremita
- Buller's albatross, Thalassarche bulleri - accidental
- Indian yellow-nosed albatross, Thalassarche carteri
- Light-mantled albatross, Phoebetria palpebrata - accidental
- Sooty albatross, Phoebetria fusca - accidental
- Laysan albatross, Phoebastria immutabilis - accidental

== Shearwaters and petrels ==
Order: Procellariiformes Family: Procellariidae

The Procellariids are the main group of medium-sized "true petrels", characterised by united nostrils with medium septum and a long outer functional primary.

- Southern giant petrel, Macronectes giganteus
- Northern giant petrel, Macronectes halli
- Southern fulmar, Fulmarus glacialoides
- Antarctic petrel, Thalassoica antarctica - accidental
- Pintado petrel, Daption capense
- Great-winged petrel, Pterodroma macroptera
- White-headed petrel, Pterodroma lessonii
- Atlantic petrel, Pterodroma incerta - accidental
- Barau's petrel, Pterodroma baraui - accidental
- Soft-plumaged petrel, Pterodroma mollis
- Kerguelen petrel, Lugensa brevirostris
- Blue petrel, Halobaena caerulea
- Broad-billed prion, Pachyptila vittata
- Salvin's prion, Pachyptila salvini
- Antarctic prion, Pachyptila desolata
- Fulmar prion, Pachyptila crassirostris
- Slender-billed prion, Pachyptila belcheri - accidental
- Fairy prion, Pachyptila turtur
- Bulwer's petrel, Bulweria bulwerii - accidental
- Jouanin's petrel, Bulweria fallax
- White-chinned petrel, Procellaria aequinoctialis
- Spectacled petrel, Procellaria conspicillata
- Grey petrel, Procellaria cinerea
- Cory's shearwater, Calonectris diomedea
- Streaked shearwater, Calonectris leucomelas - accidental
- Great shearwater, Ardenna gravis
- Flesh-footed shearwater, Ardenna carneipes
- Sooty shearwater, Ardenna griseus
- Wedge-tailed shearwater, Ardenna pacificus
- Manx shearwater, Puffinus puffinus
- Balearic shearwater, Puffinus mauretanicus
- Tropical shearwater, Puffinus bailloni - accidental
- Little shearwater, Puffinus assimilis

== Storm petrels ==
Order: Procellariiformes Family: Hydrobatidae

The storm petrel, a relative of the petrel, is the smallest seabird. It feeds on planktonic crustaceans and small fish from the surface, typically while hovering. Its flight is fluttering and sometimes bat-like.

- White-faced storm petrel, Pelagodroma marina - accidental
- Matsudaira's storm petrel, Oceanodroma matsudairae - accidental
- Wilson's storm petrel, Oceanites oceanicus
- Leach's storm petrel, Oceanodroma leucorhoa
- European storm petrel, Hydrobates pelagicus
- Black-bellied storm petrel, Fregetta tropica
- White-bellied storm petrel, Fregetta grallaria - accidental
- Grey-backed storm petrel, Garrodia nereis

== Diving petrels ==
Order: Procellariiformes Family: Pelecanoididae

- Common diving petrel, Pelecanoides urinatrix

== Tropicbirds ==
Order: Phaethontiformes Family: Phaethontidae

Tropicbirds are slender white birds of tropical oceans, with exceptionally long central tail feathers. Their long wings have black markings, as does the head.

- Red-tailed tropicbird, Phaethon rubricauda
- Red-billed tropicbird, Phaethon aethereus - accidental
- White-tailed tropicbird, Phaethon lepturus - accidental

== Boobies and gannets ==
Order: Suliformes Family: Sulidae

The sulids comprise the gannets and boobies with only boobies occurring in Southern Africa. Both groups are medium-large coastal seabirds that plunge-dive for fish.

=== Genus Sula ===
- Brown booby, Sula leucogaster
- Red-footed booby, Sula dactylatra

=== Genus Morus ===
- Cape gannet, Morus capensis
- Australian gannet, Morus serrator

== Cormorants ==
Order: Suliformes Family: Phalacrocoracidae

Phalacrocoracidae is a family of medium to large coastal, fish-eating seabirds that includes cormorants and shags. Plumage colouration is varied with the majority having mainly dark plumage, some species being black-and-white and a few being quite colourful.

- White-breasted cormorant, Phalacrocorax lucidus
- Cape cormorant, Phalacrocorax capensis - endemic
- Bank cormorant, Phalacrocorax neglectus
- Reed cormorant, Microcarbo africanus
- Crowned cormorant, Microcarbo coronatus

== Darters ==
Order: Suliformes Family: Anhingidae

There are four living species, one of which is near-threatened. The darters are often called "snake-birds" because of their long thin neck, which gives a snake-like appearance when they swim with their bodies submerged.

- African darter, Anhinga melanogaster

== Frigatebirds ==
Order: Suliformes Family: Fregatidae

Frigatebirds are large seabirds usually found over tropical oceans. They are large, black or black-and-white, with long wings and deeply forked tails. The males have coloured inflatable throat pouches. They do not swim or walk and cannot take off from a flat surface. Having the largest wingspan-to-body-weight ratio of any bird, they are essentially aerial, able to stay aloft for more than a week.

- Great frigatebird, Fregata minor
- Lesser frigatebird, Fregata ariel

== Pelicans ==
Order: Pelecaniformes Family: Pelecanidae

Pelicans are very large water birds with a distinctive pouch under their beak. Like other birds in the order Pelecaniformes, they have four webbed toes.

- Eastern white pelican, Pelecanus onocrotalus
- Pink-backed pelican, Pelecanus rufescens

== Herons, egrets, and bitterns ==
Order: Pelecaniformes Family: Ardeidae

The family Ardeidae contains the bitterns, herons and egrets. Herons and egrets are medium to large wading birds with long necks and legs. Bitterns tend to be shorter necked and more secretive. Members of Ardeidae fly with their necks retracted, unlike other long-necked birds such as storks, ibises and spoonbills.

=== Herons ===
- Grey heron, Ardea cinerea
- Black-headed heron, Ardea melanocephala
- Goliath heron, Ardea goliath
- Purple heron, Ardea purpurea
- Squacco heron, Ardeola ralloides
- Madagascar heron, Ardeola idae
- Rufous-bellied heron, Ardeola rufiventris
- White-backed night heron, Gorsachius leuconotus
- Black-crowned night heron, Nycticorax nycticorax
- Green-backed heron, Butorides striata
- Little blue heron, Egretta caerulea - accidental
- Western reef heron, Egretta gularis - accidental

=== Egrets ===
- Yellow-billed egret, Egretta intermedia
- Great egret, Ardea alba
- Little egret, Egretta garzetta
- Cattle egret, Bubulcus ibis
- Black egret, Egretta ardesiaca
- Slaty egret, Egretta vinaceigula

=== Bitterns ===
- Great bittern, Botaurus stellaris
- Dwarf bittern, Ixobrychus sturmii
- Little bittern, Ixobrychus minutus

== Ibises and spoonbills ==
Order: Pelecaniformes Family: Threskiornithidae

Threskiornithidae is a family of large terrestrial and wading birds that includes the ibises and spoonbills. They have long, broad wings with 11 primary and about 20 secondary feathers. They are strong fliers and, rather surprisingly, given their size and weight, very capable soarers.

- African spoonbill, Platalea alba
- Sacred ibis, Threskiornis aethiopicus
- Hadeda ibis, Bostrychia hagedash
- Glossy ibis, Plegadis falcinellus
- Southern bald ibis, Geronticus calvus - endemic

== Hamerkop ==
Order: Pelecaniformes Family: Scopidae

- Hamerkop, Scopus umbretta

== Storks ==
Order: Ciconiiformes Family: Ciconiidae

Storks have no syrinx and are mute, giving no bird call; bill-clattering is an important mode of communication at the nest. Many species are migratory. Most storks eat frogs, fish, insects, earthworms, and small birds or mammals.

- Black stork, Ciconia nigra
- White stork, Ciconia ciconia
- Abdim's stork, Ciconia abdimii
- Yellow-billed stork, Ciconia ibis
- Marabou stork, Leptoptilos crumeniferus
- Saddle-billed stork, Ephippiorhynchus senegalensis
- Open-billed stork, Anastomus lamelligerus
- Woolly-necked stork, Ciconia episcopus

== Flamingoes ==
Order: Phoenicopteriformes Family: Phoenicopteridae

Flamingoes are gregarious wading birds, usually 3 to 5 feet (0.9 to 1.5 m) tall, found in both the Western and Eastern Hemispheres. Flamingos filter-feed on shellfish and algae. Their oddly shaped beaks are specially adapted to separate mud and silt from the food they consume and, uniquely, are used upside-down.

- Greater flamingo, Phoenicopterus roseus
- Lesser flamingo, Phoenicopterus minor

== Ducks, geese and swans ==
Order: Anseriformes Family: Anatidae

Anatidae includes the ducks and most duck-like waterfowl, such as geese and swans. These birds are adapted to an aquatic existence, with webbed feet, bills that are flattened to some extent, and oily feathers that readily shed water.

- Mute swan, Cygnus olor - introduced
- Knob-billed duck, Sarkidiornis melanotos
- Egyptian goose, Alopochen aegyptiacus
- South African shelduck, Tadorna cana
- Spur-winged goose, Plectropterus gambensis
- White-faced whistling duck, Dendrocygna viduata
- Fulvous whistling duck, Dendrocygna bicolor
- White-backed duck, Thalassornis leuconotus
- African pygmy goose, Nettapus auritus
- African black duck, Anas sparsa
- Mallard, Anas platyrhynchos - introduced
- Northern shoveler, Anas clypeata - accidental
- Northern pintail, Anas acuta - accidental
- Garganey, Anas querquedula - accidental
- Cape teal, Anas capensis
- Yellow-billed duck, Anas undulata
- Red-billed teal, Anas erythrorhyncha
- Blue-billed teal, Anas hottentota
- Cape shoveler, Anas smithii
- Southern pochard, Netta erythrophthalma
- Maccoa duck, Oxyura maccoa
- Tufted duck, Aythya fuligula - introduced

== Osprey ==
Order: Accipitriformes Family: Pandionidae

- Osprey, Pandion haliaetus

== Hawks to Old World vultures ==
Order: Accipitriformes Family: Accipitridae

Accipitridae is a family of birds of prey, which includes hawks, eagles, kites, harriers, snake eagles, goshawks, sparrowhawks, buzzards and old world vultures. These birds have very large powerful hooked beaks for tearing flesh from their prey, strong legs, powerful talons and keen eyesight.

=== Subfamily: Aegypiinae ===
- Lappet-faced vulture, Torgos tracheliotus
- White-headed vulture, Triginoceps occipitalis
- Rüppell's vulture, Gyps rueppellii - accidental
- Cape vulture, Gyps coprotheres
- White-backed vulture, Gyps africanus
- Bearded vulture, Gypaetus barbatus
- Palm-nut vulture, Gyphohierax angolensis
- Egyptian vulture, Neophron percnopterus - accidental
- Hooded vulture, Necrosyrtes monachus

=== Subfamily: Buteoninae ===
- African fish eagle, Haliaeetus vocifer
- Bateleur, Terathopius ecaudatus
- African hawk-eagle, Aquila spilogaster
- Ayres's hawk-eagle, Aquila ayresii
- Steppe eagle, Aquila nipalensis
- Tawny eagle, Aquila rapax
- Lesser spotted eagle, Aquila pomarina
- Verreaux's eagle, Aquila verreauxii
- Bonelli's eagle, Aquila fasciata
- Martial eagle, Polemaetus bellicosus
- African crowned eagle, Stephanoaetus coronatus
- Booted eagle, Hieraaetus pennatus
- Wahlberg's eagle, Hieraaetus wahlbergi
- Long-crested eagle, Lophaetus occipitalis
- Forest buzzard, Buteo oreophilus trizonatus
- Augur buzzard, Buteo augur
- Long-legged buzzard, Buteo rufinus - accidental
- Steppe buzzard, Buteo buteo vulpinus
- Jackal buzzard, Buteo rufofuscus

=== Subfamily: Circaetinae ===
- Brown snake eagle, Ciraetus cinereus
- Black-breasted snake-eagle, Circaetus pectoralis
- Fasciated snake-eagle, Ciraetus fasciolatus
- Western banded snake eagle, Circaetus cinerascens

=== Subfamily: Perninae ===
- European honey buzzard, Pernis apivorus
- Lizard buzzard, Kaupifalco monogrammicus
- African cuckoo hawk, Aviceda cuculoides

=== Subfamily: Circinae ===
- African marsh harrier, Circus ranivorus
- European marsh harrier, Circus aeruginosus
- Black harrier, Circus maurus
- Montagu's harrier, Circus pygargus
- Pallid harrier, Circus macrourus
- African harrier-hawk, Polyboroides typus
- Gymnogene, Polyboroides typus

=== Subfamily: Milvinae ===
- Black kite, Milvus migrans
- Yellow-billed kite, Milvus aegyptius

=== Subfamily: Elaninae ===
- Black-winged kite, Elanus caeruleus
- Bat hawk, Macheiramphus alcinus

=== Subfamily: Accipitrinae ===
- Southern pale chanting, Melierax canorus
- Dark chanting goshawk, Melierax metabates
- Gabar goshawk, Melierax gabar
- Ovambo sparrowhawk, Accipiter ovampensis
- Gabar goshawk, Micronisus gabar
- Little sparrowhawk, Accipiter minullus
- Black sparrowhawk, Accipiter melanoleucus
- African goshawk, Accipiter tachiro
- Rufous-chested sparrowhawk, Accipiter rufiventris
- Shikra, Accipiter badius

== Secretarybird ==
Order: Accipitriformes Family: Sagittariidae

The secretarybird is an extraordinary bird of prey. Endemic to Africa, this mostly terrestrial bird is usually found in the open grasslands and savannahs of sub-Sahara Africa.

- Secretarybird, Sagittarius serpentarius

== Falcons, hobbies, and kestrels ==
Order: Falconiformes Family: Falconidae

Falconidae is a family of diurnal birds of prey. They differ from hawks, eagles and kites in that they kill with their beaks instead of their talons. There are 62 species worldwide and 16 in Southern Africa.

=== Falcons ===
- Pygmy falcon, Polihierax semitorquatus
- Lanner falcon, Falco biarmicus
- Peregrine falcon, Falco peregrinus
- Taita falcon, Falco fasciinucha
- Red-necked falcon, Falco chicquera
- Eleonora's falcon, Falco eleonorae - accidental
- Sooty falcon, Falco concolor
- Amur falcon, Falco amurensis
- Red-footed falcon, Falco vespertinus

=== Kestrels ===
- Lesser kestrel, Falco naumanni
- Rock kestrel, Falco rupicolus
- Greater kestrel, Falco rupicoloides
- Grey kestrel, Falco ardosiaceus
- Dickinson's kestrel, Falco dickinsoni

=== Hobbies ===
- European hobby, Falco subbuteo
- African hobby, Falco cuvierii

== Quails to peafowl ==
Order: Galliformes Family: Phasianidae

The Phasianidae are a family of terrestrial birds that consists of quails, partridges, snowcocks, francolins, spurfowls, tragopans, monals, pheasants, peafowls and jungle fowls. In general, they are plump (though they vary in size) and have broad, relatively short wings. There are 156 species worldwide and 17 in Southern Africa.

=== Francolins ===
- Orange River francolin, Scleroptila levaillantoides
- Red-winged francolin, Scleroptila levaillantii
- Grey-winged francolin, Scleroptila africanus - endemic
- Shelley's francolin, Scleroptila shelleyi
- Coqui francolin, Peliperdix coqui
- Crested francolin, Dendroperdix sephaena
- Swainson's francolin, Francolinus swainsonii

=== Spurfowls ===
- Hartlaub's spurfowl, Pternistis hartlaubi
- Red-billed spurfowl, Pternistis adspersus
- Cape spurfowl, Pternistis capensis - endemic
- Natal spurfowl, Pternistis natalensis
- Red-necked spurfowl, Pternistis afer

=== Partridge ===
- Chukar partridge, Alectoris chukar - introduced

=== Peafowl ===
- Indian peafowl, Pavo cristatus - introduced

=== Quails ===
- Common quail, Coturnix coturnix
- Harlequin quail, Coturnix delegorguei
- Blue quail, Coturnix adansonii

== Ostrich ==
Order: Struthioniformes Family: Struthionidae

The ostrich is the only living species of its family, Struthionidae, and its genus, Struthio. It is distinctive in its appearance, with a long neck and legs and the ability to run at speeds of about 65 km/h (40 mph).

- Common ostrich, Struthio camelus

== Guineafowls ==
Order: Galliformes Family: Numididae

Guineafowls are a group of African seed-eating, ground-nesting birds resembling partridges, but with featherless heads and spangled grey plumage. There are six species worldwide and two in Southern Africa.

- Crested guineafowl, Guttera edouardi
- Helmeted guineafowl, Numida meleagris

== Rails to gallinules ==
Order: Gruiformes Family: Rallidae

Rallidae is a large family of small to medium-sized birds that includes the rails, crakes, moorhens, coots, flufftails and gallinules. The most typical family members occupy dense vegetation in damp environments near lakes, swamps or rivers. In general they are shy and secretive birds, making them difficult to observe. Most species have strong legs and long toes well adapted to soft uneven surfaces. They tend to have short, rounded wings and to be weak fliers. There are 143 species worldwide and 19 in Southern Africa.

=== Crakes ===
- African crake, Crecopsis egregia
- Corn crake, Crex crex
- Black crake, Amaurornis flavirostris
- Baillon's crake, Porzana pusilla
- Spotted crake, Porzana porzana
- Striped crake, Aenigmatolimnas marginalis

=== Rails ===
- African rail, Rallus caerulescens

=== Coots ===
- Red-knobbed coot, Fulica cristata

=== Gallinules ===
- Allen's gallinule, Porphyrio alleni
- American purple gallinule, Porphyrio martinicus - accidental
- African swamphen, Porphyrio madagascariensis

=== Flufftails ===
- Buff-spotted flufftail, Sarothrura elegans
- Red-chested flufftail, Sarothrura rufa
- Streaky-breasted flufftail, Sarothrura boehmi - accidental
- Striped flufftail, Sarothrura affinis
- White-winged flufftail, Sarothrura ayresi - accidental
- Chestnut-headed flufftail, Sarothrura lugens

=== Moorhens ===
- Common moorhen, Gallinula chloropus
- Lesser moorhen, Gallinula angulata

== Finfoots ==
Order: Gruiformes Family: Heliornithidae

The finfoots are a small family of tropical birds with webbed lobes on their feet similar to those of grebes and coots. There are three species and one occurs in Southern Africa.

- African finfoot, Podica senegalensis

== Buttonquails ==
Order: Charadriiformes Family: Turnicidae

The buttonquails or hemipodes are a small family of birds that resemble, but are unrelated to, true quails.

- Kurrichane buttonquail, Turnix sylvaticus
- Black-rumped buttonquail, Turnix nanus
- Fynbos buttonquail, Turnix hottentottus

== Jacanas ==
Order: Charadriiformes Family: Jacanidae

The jacanas are a group of tropical waders in the family Jacanidae. They are found worldwide within the tropical zone. They are identifiable by their huge feet and claws that enable them to walk on floating vegetation in the shallow lakes that are their preferred habitat. There eight species worldwide and two in Southern Africa.

- African jacana, Actophilornis africanus
- Lesser jacana, Microparra capensis

== Cranes ==
Order: Gruiformes Family: Gruidae

Cranes are large, long-legged and long-necked birds of the order Gruiformes, and family Gruidae. There are 15 living species of cranes worldwide and three in Southern Africa.

- Grey crowned crane, Balearica regulorum
- Blue crane, Anthropoides paradiseus
- Wattled crane, Bugeranus carunculatus

== Bustards and korhaans ==
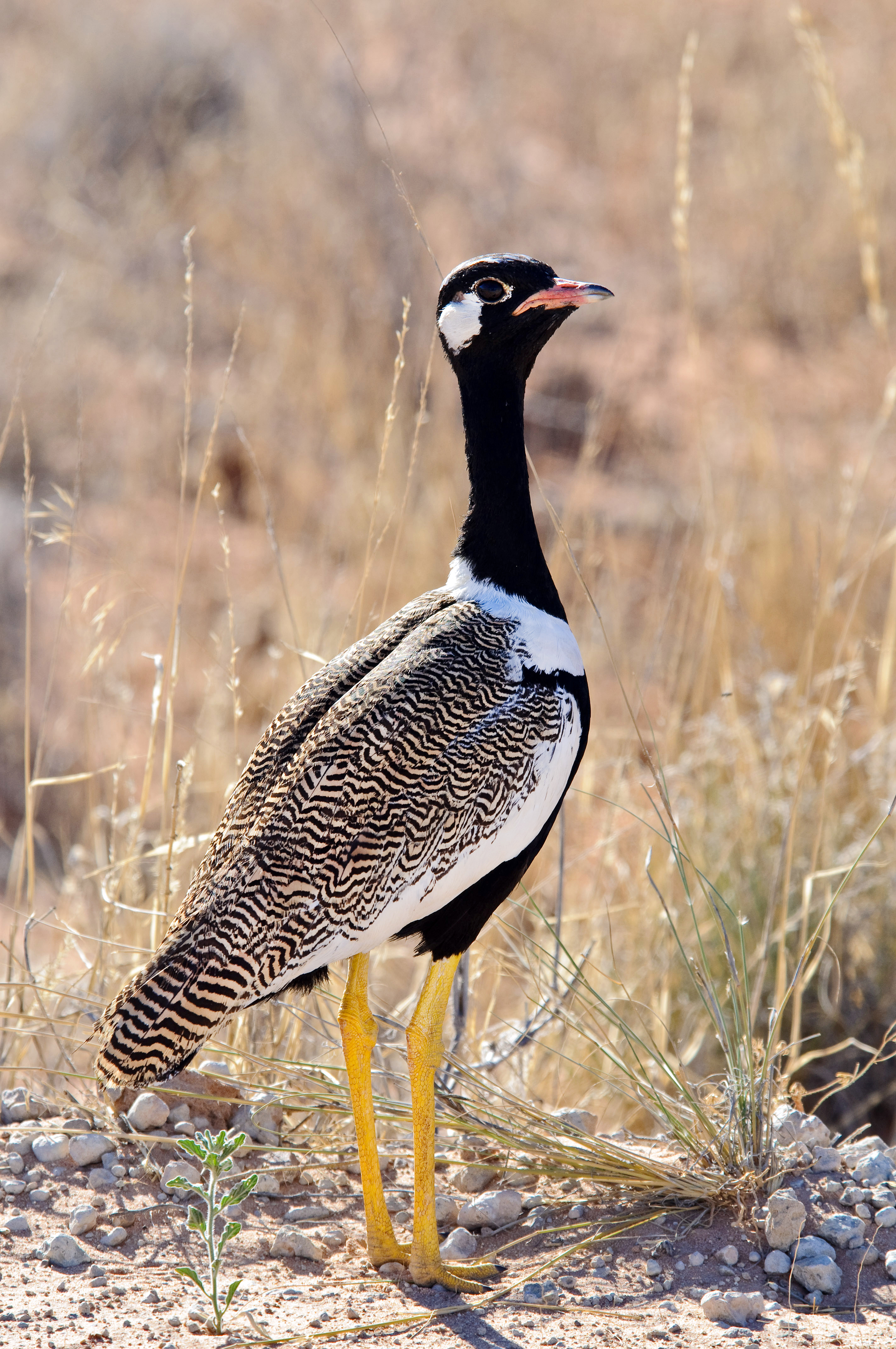
The northern black korhaan is a widespread endemic species

Order: Otidiformes Family: Otididae

Bustards and korhaans are large terrestrial birds mainly associated with dry open country and steppes in the Old World. They make up the family Otididae (formerly known as Otidae). Bustards and korhaans are omnivorous and nest on the ground. They walk steadily on strong legs and big toes, pecking for food as they go. They have long broad wings with "fingered" wingtips and striking patterns in flight. Many have interesting mating displays. There are 27 species worldwide, 11 in Southern Africa.

- Denham's bustard, Neotis denhami
- Ludwig's bustard, Neotis ludwigii - near-endemic
- Kori bustard, Ardeotis kori (nom. race)
- Black-bellied bustard, Lissotis melanogaster
- Red-crested korhaan, Lophotis ruficrista
- Southern black korhaan, Afrotis afra - endemic
- Northern black korhaan, Afrotis afraoides - endemic
- Rüppell's korhaan, Eupodotis rueppellii - near-endemic
- Karoo korhaan, Eupodotis vigorsii - endemic
- Blue korhaan, Eupodotis caerulescens - endemic
- White-bellied korhaan, Eupodotis senegalensis

== Crab-plover ==
Order: Charadriiformes Family: Dromadidae

The crab-plover, Dromas ardeola is a bird related to the waders, but is sufficiently distinctive to be a family unto itself Dromadidae. Its relationship within the Charadriiformes is unclear, some writers have them in close to the thick-knees, or the pratincoles, or even closer to the auks and gulls. It is the only member of the genus Dromas.

- Crab-plover, Dromas ardeola

== Oystercatchers ==
Order: Charadriiformes Family: Haematopodidae

The oystercatchers are large, obvious and noisy plover-like birds, with strong bills used for smashing or prising open molluscs. There are 11 species worldwide and two in Southern Africa.

- Eurasian oystercatcher, Haematopus ostralegus
- African black oystercatcher, Haematopus moquini

== Stilts and avocets ==
Order: Charadriiformes Family: Recurvirostridae

Recurvirostridae is a family of large wading birds that includes avocets and stilts. Avocets have long legs and long up-curved bills. Stilts have extremely long legs and long, thin, straight bills. There are nine species worldwide, two in Southern Africa.

- Black-winged stilt, Himantopus himantopus
- Pied avocet, Recurvirostra avosetta

== Plovers and lapwings ==
Order: Charadriiformes Family: Charadriidae

The family Charadriidae includes the plovers, dotterels and lapwings. They are small to medium-sized birds with compact bodies, short, thick necks and long, usually pointed, wings. They are found in open country worldwide, mostly in habitats near water. There are 66 species worldwide, 21 in Southern Africa.

- Pacific golden plover, Pluvialis fulva - accidental
- American golden plover, Pluvialis dominica - accidental
- Grey plover, Pluvialis squatarola
- Common ringed plover, Charadrius hiaticula
- Little ringed plover, Charadrius dubius
- Kittlitz's plover, Charadrius pecuarius
- Three-banded plover, Charadrius tricollaris
- Chestnut-banded plover, Charadrius pallidus
- Kentish plover, Charadrius alexandrinus - accidental
- White-fronted plover, Charadrius marginatus
- Lesser sand plover, Charadrius mongolus
- Greater sand plover, Charadrius leschenaultii
- Caspian plover, Charadrius asiaticus
- Long-toed lapwing, Vanellus crassirostris - accidental
- Blacksmith lapwing, Vanellus armatus
- Spur-winged lapwing, Vanellus spinosus
- White-crowned lapwing, Vanellus albiceps
- African wattled lapwing, Vanellus senegallus
- Senegal lapwing, Vanellus lugubris
- Black-winged lapwing, Vanellus melanopterus
- Crowned lapwing, Vanellus coronatus

== Sandpipers to phalaropes ==
Order: Charadriiformes Family: Scolopacidae

Scolopacidae is a large diverse family of small to medium-sized shorebirds including the sandpipers, curlews, godwits, shanks, tattlers, woodcocks, snipes, dowitchers and phalaropes. The majority of these species eat small invertebrates picked out of the mud or soil. Different lengths of legs and bills enable multiple species to feed in the same habitat, particularly on the coast, without direct competition for food. There are 86 species worldwide, 37 in Southern Africa.

=== Shanks and tattlers ===
(Genera: Xenus, Actitis, Tringa and Heteroscelus)

- Marsh sandpiper, Tringa stagnatilis
- Spotted redshank, Tringa erythropus - accidental
- Common redshank, Tringa totanus - accidental
- Common greenshank, Tringa nebularia
- Greater yellowlegs, Tringa melanoleuca - accidental
- Lesser yellowlegs, Tringa flavipes - accidental
- Green sandpiper, Tringa ochropus
- Wood sandpiper, Tringa glareola
- Terek sandpiper, Xenus cinereus
- Common sandpiper, Actitis hypoleucos

=== Calidrids and turnstones ===
(Genera: Calidris, Aphriza, Eurynorhynchus, Limicola, Tryngites, Arenaria and Philomachus)

- Red knot, Calidris canutus
- Great knot, Calidris tenuirostris - accidental
- Sanderling, Calidris alba
- Baird's sandpiper, Calidris bairdii - accidental
- White-rumped sandpiper, Calidris fuscicollis - accidental
- Pectoral sandpiper, Calidris melanotos - accidental
- Dunlin, Calidris alpina - accidental
- Curlew sandpiper, Calidris ferruginea
- Buff-breasted sandpiper, Tryngites subruficollis - accidental
- Broad-billed sandpiper, Limicola falcinellus - accidental
- Little stint, Calidris minuta
- Red-necked stint, Calidris ruficollis - accidental
- Temminck's stint, Calidris temminckii - accidental
- Long-toed stint, Calidris subminuta - accidental
- Ruddy turnstone, Arenaria interpres
- Ruff, Philomachus pugnax

=== Snipe and woodcocks ===
(Genera: Coenocorypha, Lymnocryptes, Gallinago and Scolopax)

- Great snipe, Gallinago media - accidental
- African snipe, Gallinago nigripennis

=== Godwits ===
(Genus: Limosa)

- Black-tailed godwit, Limosa limosa
- Hudsonian godwit, Limosa haemastica - accidental
- Bar-tailed godwit, Limosa lapponica

=== Curlews ===
(Genus: Numenius)

- Common whimbrel, Numenius phaeopus
- Eurasian curlew, Numenius arquata

=== Phalaropes ===
(Genus Phalaropus)

- Wilson's phalarope, Steganopus tricolor - accidental
- Red-necked phalarope, Phalaropus lobatus
- Red phalarope, Phalaropus fulicaria

== Painted-snipe ==
Order: Charadriiformes Family: Rostratulidae

Painted-snipes are three distinctive wader species placed together in their own family Rostratulidae. They are short-legged, long-billed birds similar in shape to the true snipes, but much more brightly coloured. There are three species of painted-snipe worldwide, one in Southern Africa.

- Greater painted-snipe, Rostratula benghalensis

== Pratincoles and coursers ==
Order: Charadriiformes Family: Glareolidae

Glareolidae is a family of birds in the wader suborder Charadri. There are 17 species worldwide, eight in Southern Africa.

The pratincoles have short legs, long pointed wings and long forked tails. They typically hunt their insect prey on the wing like swallows.

- Collared pratincole, Glareola pratincola
- Black-winged pratincole, Glareola nordmanni
- Rock pratincole, Glareola nuchalis - accidental

The coursers have long legs, short wings and long, pointed bills that curve downwards. They inhabit deserts and similar arid regions.

- Double-banded courser, Rhinoptilus africanus
- Bronze-winged courser, Rhinoptilus chalcopterus
- Three-banded courser, Rhinoptilus cinctus - accidental
- Burchell's courser, Cursorius rufus
- Temminck's courser, Cursorius temminckii

== Thick-knees ==
Order: Charadriiformes Family: Burhinidae

The stone-curlews or thick-knees are a group of largely tropical waders in the family Burhinidae. They are found worldwide within the tropical zone, with some species also breeding in temperate Europe and Australia.

They are medium to large waders with strong black or yellow-black bills, large yellow eyes—which give them a reptilian appearance—and cryptic plumage. There are nine species worldwide and two of which occur in Southern Africa.

- Water thick-knee, Burhinus vermiculatus
- Spotted thick-knee, Burhinus capensis

== Skuas and jaegers ==
Order: Charadriiformes Family: Stercorariidae

The family Stercorariidae are, in general, medium to large birds, typically with grey or brown plumage, often with white markings on the wings. They nest on the ground in temperate and arctic regions and are long-distance migrants. There are seven species worldwide and five in Southern Africa.

- Subantarctic skua, Catharacta antarctica
- South polar skua, Catharacta maccormicki - accidental
- Pomarine jaeger, Stercorarius pomarinus
- Parasitic jaeger, Stercorarius parasiticus
- Long-tailed jaeger, Stercorarius longicaudus

== Sheathbills ==
Order: Charadriiformes Family: Chionididae

The sheathbills are the two species of birds in the genus Chionis in the family Chionididae. They are confined to Antarctic regions, and are the only Antarctic birds without webbed feet. There are two species worldwide, one in Southern Africa.

- Snowy sheathbill, Chionis alba (A)

== Gulls and kittiwakes ==
Order: Charadriiformes Family: Laridae

Laridae is a family of medium to large seabirds, the gulls and kittiwakes. They are typically grey or white, often with black markings on the head or wings. They have stout, longish bills and webbed feet. There are 55 species worldwide, 13 in Southern Africa.

- Kelp gull, Larus dominicanus
- White-eyed gull, Ichthyaetus leucophthalmus
- Ring-billed gull, Larus delawarensis
- Lesser black-backed gull, Larus fuscus
- Heuglin's gull, Larus heuglini - accidental
- Caspian gull, Larus cachinnans - accidental
- Grey-headed gull, Chroicocephalus cirrocephalus
- Hartlaub's gull, Chroicocephalus hartlaubii
- Common black-headed gull, Chroicocephalus ridibundus - accidental
- Slender-billed gull, Chroicocephalus genei
- Franklin's gull, Leucophaeus pipixcan - accidental
- Sabine's gull, Xema sabini
- Black-legged kittiwake, Rissa tridactyla - accidental

== Skimmers ==
Order: Charadriiformes Family: Rynchopidae

The skimmers are a small family of tern-like birds in the order Charadriiformes. They have an elongated lower mandible that they use to feed while flying low over the water, skimming the water for small fish. There are three species worldwide, one in Southern Africa.

- African skimmer, Rynchops flavirostris

== Terns and noddies ==
Order: Charadriiformes Family: Sternidae

Terns and noddies are a group of generally medium to large seabirds typically with grey or white plumage, often with black markings on the head. Most terns hunt fish by diving but some pick insects off the surface of fresh water. Terns are generally long-lived birds, with several species known to live in excess of 30 years. There are 44 species worldwide, 22 in Southern Africa.

- Gull-billed tern, Gelochelidon nilotica - accidental
- Caspian tern, Hydroprogne caspia
- Royal tern, Thalasseus maximus
- Lesser crested tern, Thalasseus bengalensis
- Greater crested tern, Thalasseus bergii
- Sandwich tern, Thalasseus sandvicensis
- Roseate tern, Sterna dougallii
- Black-naped tern, Sterna sumatrana - accidental
- Common tern, Sterna hirundo
- Arctic tern, Sterna paradisaea
- Antarctic tern, Sterna vittata
- White-cheeked tern, Sterna repressa - accidental
- Little tern, Sternula albifrons
- Damara tern, Sternula balaenarum
- Bridled tern, Onychoprion anaethetus - accidental
- Sooty tern, Onychoprion fuscatus
- Whiskered tern, Chlidonias hybrida
- White-winged tern, Chlidonias leucopterus
- Black tern, Chlidonias niger
- White tern, Gygis alba
- Brown noddy, Anous stolidus - accidental
- Lesser noddy, Anous tenuirostris - accidental

== Sandgrouses ==
Order: Pterocliformes Family: Pteroclidae

The sandgrouses are a group of 16 near passerine bird species in the order Pterocliformes. They are restricted to treeless open country in the Old World, such as plains and semi-deserts. Sandgrouse have small, pigeon like heads and necks, but sturdy compact bodies. They have long pointed wings and sometimes tails and a fast direct flight. Flocks fly to watering holes at dawn and dusk. There are 16 species worldwide, four in Southern Africa.

- Namaqua sandgrouse, Pterocles namaqua
- Yellow-throated sandgrouse, Pterocles gutturalis
- Double-banded sandgrouse, Pterocles bicinctus
- Burchell's sandgrouse, Pterocles burchelli

== Pigeons and doves ==
Order: Columbiformes Family: Columbidae

Pigeons and doves are stout-bodied birds with short necks and short slender bills with a fleshy cere.

- Rock dove, Columba livia
- Speckled pigeon, Columba guinea
- African olive pigeon, Columba arquatrix
- Eastern bronze-naped pigeon, Columba delegorguei
- Lemon dove, Aplopelia larvata
- Laughing dove, Spilopelia senegalensis
- Cape turtle dove, Streptopelia capicola
- Mourning collared dove, Streptopelia decipiens
- Cape turtle dove, Streptopelia capicola
- Red-eyed dove, Streptopelia semitorquata
- Emerald-spotted wood dove, Turtur chalcospilos
- Blue-spotted wood dove, Turtur afer
- Tambourine dove, Turtur tympanistria
- Namaqua dove, Oena capensis
- African green pigeon, Treron calvus

== African and New World parrots ==
Order: Psittaciformes Family: Psittacidae.

=== Poicephalus ===
- Cape parrot, Poicephalus robustus
- Grey-headed parrot, Poicephalus fuscicollis
- Meyer's parrot, Poicephalus meyeri
- Brown-headed parrot, Poicephalus cryptoxanthus
- Rüppell's parrot, Poicephalus rueppellii

== Old World parrots ==
Order: Psittaciformes Family: Psittaculidae.

=== Agapornis ===
- Peach-faced lovebird, Agapornis roseicollis
- Lilian's lovebird, Agapornis lilianae
- Black-cheeked lovebird, Agapornis nigrigenis

=== Psittacula ===
- Rose-ringed parakeet, Psittacula krameri - introduced

== Turacos ==
Order: Cuculiformes Family: Musophagidae

The turacos, plantain eaters and go-away birds make up the bird family Musophagidae (literally banana-eaters). In Southern Africa both turacos and go-away birds are commonly known as louries. Traditionally, this group has been placed in the cuckoo order Cuculiformes, but Sibley-Ahlquist taxonomy raises this group to a full order Musophagiformes. There are 23 species worldwide, six in Southern Africa.

- Schalow's turaco, Tauraco schalowi
- Livingstone's turaco, Tauraco livingstonii
- Knysna turaco, Tauraco corythaix
- Ross's turaco, Musophaga rossae
- Purple-crested turaco, Gallirex porphyreolophus
- Grey go-away-bird, Corythaixoides concolor

== Cuckoos ==
Order: Cuculiformes Family: Cuculidae

The family Cuculidae includes cuckoos, coucals, roadrunners and anis. These birds are of variable size with slender bodies, long tails and strong legs. There are 138 species worldwide, 21 in Southern Africa.

=== Cuckoo ===
- Jacobin cuckoo, Clamator jacobinus
- Levaillant's cuckoo, Clamator levaillantii
- Great spotted cuckoo, Clamator glandarius
- Thick-billed cuckoo, Pachycoccyx audeberti
- Red-chested cuckoo, Cuculus solitarius
- Black cuckoo, Cuculus clamosus
- Common cuckoo, Cuculus canorus
- African cuckoo, Cuculus gularis
- Lesser cuckoo, Cuculus poliocephalus - accidental
- Madagascar cuckoo, Cuculus rochii - accidental
- Barred long-tailed cuckoo, Cercococcyx montanus
- Klaas's cuckoo, Chrysococcyx klaas
- African emerald cuckoo, Chrysococcyx cupreus
- Diderick cuckoo, Chrysococcyx caprius
- Green malkoha, Ceuthmochares australis

=== Coucals ===
- Black coucal, Centropus grillii
- Coppery-tailed coucal, Centropus cupreicaudus
- Senegal coucal, Centropus senegalensis
- White-browed coucal, Centropus superciliosus
- Burchell's coucal, Centropus burchellii

== Barn owls ==
Order: Strigiformes Family: Tytonidae

Barn owls are medium to large owls with large heads and characteristic heart-shaped faces. They have long strong legs with powerful talons. There are 16 species worldwide, two in Southern Africa.

- Barn owl, Tyto alba
- African grass owl, Tyto capensis

== Typical owls ==
Order: Strigiformes Family: Strigidae

The typical owls are small to large solitary nocturnal birds of prey. They have large forward-facing eyes and ears, a hawk-like beak and a conspicuous circle of feathers around each eye called a facial disk. There are 195 species worldwide and ten in Southern Africa.

- African scops owl, Otus senegalensis
- Southern white-faced owl, Ptilopsis granti
- Cape eagle-owl, Bubo capensis
- Spotted eagle-owl, Bubo africanus
- Verreaux's eagle-owl, Bubo lacteus
- Pel's fishing owl, Scotopelia peli
- African wood owl, Strix woodfordii
- Pearl-spotted owlet, Glaucidium perlatum
- African barred owlet, Glaucidium capense
- Marsh owl, Asio capensis

== Nightjars ==
Order: Caprimulgiformes Family: Caprimulgidae

Nightjars are medium-sized nocturnal birds that usually nest on the ground. They have long wings, short legs and very short bills. Most have small feet, of little use for walking, and long pointed wings. Their soft plumage is cryptically coloured to resemble bark or leaves. There are 86 species worldwide, seven in Southern Africa.

- Fiery-necked nightjar, Caprimulgus pectoralis
- Freckled nightjar, Caprimulgus tristigma
- Swamp nightjar, Caprimulgus natalensis
- Square-tailed nightjar, Caprimulgus fossii
- Rufous-cheeked nightjar, Caprimulgus rufigena
- European nightjar, Caprimulgus europaeus
- Pennant-winged nightjar, Macrodipteryx vexillarius

== Swifts and spinetails ==
Order: Apodiformes Family: Apodidae

Swifts and spinetails are small birds which spend the majority of their lives flying. These birds have very short legs and never settle voluntarily on the ground, perching instead only on vertical surfaces. Many swifts have long swept-back wings which resemble a crescent or boomerang. There are 98 species worldwide, 13 in Southern Africa.

=== Swifts ===
- Scarce swift, Schoutedenapus myoptilus
- African palm swift, Cypsiurus parvus
- Alpine swift, Tachymarptis melba
- Mottled swift, Tachymarptis aequatorialis
- Common swift, Apus apus
- Pallid swift, Apus pallidus
- African black swift, Apus barbatus
- Bradfield's swift, Apus bradfieldi
- Little swift, Apus affinis
- Horus swift, Apus horus
- White-rumped swift, Apus caffer

=== Spinetails ===
- Mottled spinetail, Telacanthura ussheri
- Bat-like spinetail, Neafrapus boehmi

== Trogons ==
Order: Trogoniformes Family: Trogonidae

The trogons and quetzals feed on insects and fruit, and their broad bills and weak legs reflect their diet and arboreal habits. Though fast fliers, they are reluctant to fly any distance. Trogons do not migrate. There are 39 species worldwide, one in Southern Africa.

- Narina trogon, Apaloderma narina

== Pittas ==
Order: Passeriformes Family: Pittidae

Pittas are medium-sized by passerine standards and are stocky, with strong, longish legs, very short tails and stout bills. Many are brightly coloured. There are 32 species worldwide, one in Southern Africa.

- African pitta, Pitta angolensis

== Broadbills ==
Order: Passeriformes Family: Eurylaimidae

Broadbills are brightly coloured birds, which feed on fruit and also take insects in flycatcher fashion, snapping their broad bills. Their habitat is canopies of wet forests, so despite their colours, they are difficult to observe. There are 16 species worldwide, one in Southern Africa.

- African broadbill, Smithornis capensis

== Mousebirds ==
Order: Coliiformes Family: Coliidae

Mousebirds are slender greyish or brown birds with soft, hairlike body feathers and very long thin tails. They are arboreal, and scurry through the leaves like rodents, searching for berries, fruit and buds. There are six species worldwide, three in Southern Africa.

- Red-faced mousebird, Colius indicus
- Speckled mousebird, Colius striatus
- White-backed mousebird, Colius colius

== Kingfishers ==
Kingfishers are medium-sized birds with large heads, long, pointed bills, short legs and stubby tails. There are 94 species worldwide, ten in Southern Africa.

=== River kingfishers ===
Order: Coraciiformes Subfamily: Alcedininae

- Half-collared kingfisher, Alcedo semitorquata
- Malachite kingfisher, Alcedo cristata
- African pygmy kingfisher, Ispidina picta

=== Tree kingfishers ===
Order: Coraciiformes Subfamily: Halcyoninae

- Grey-headed kingfisher, Halcyon leucocephala
- Woodland kingfisher, Halcyon senegalensis
- Mangrove kingfisher, Halcyon senegaloides
- Brown-hooded kingfisher, Halcyon albiventris
- Striped kingfisher, Halcyon chelicuti

=== Water kingfishers ===
Order: Coraciiformes Subfamily: Cerylinae

- Giant kingfisher, Megaceryle maximus
- Pied kingfisher, Ceryle rudis

== Bee-eaters ==
Order: Coraciiformes Family: Meropidae

Bee-eaters are gregarious; they form colonies by nesting in burrows tunnelled into the side of sandy banks, such as those that have collapsed on the edges of rivers. They generally produce two to nine white eggs per clutch—depending on species. They are widely distributed and common. As they live in colonies, large numbers of these holes are often seen together, white streaks from their accumulated droppings accentuating the entrances to the nests. Most of the species in the family are monogamous, and have biparental care of the young. There are 26 species worldwide, nine in Southern Africa.

- White-fronted bee-eater, Merops bullockoides
- Little bee-eater, Merops pusillus
- Swallow-tailed bee-eater, Merops hirundineus
- White-throated bee-eater, Merops albicollis - accidental
- Böhm's bee-eater, Merops boehmi
- Blue-cheeked bee-eater, Merops persicus
- Madagascar bee-eater, Merops superciliosus - accidental
- European bee-eater, Merops apiaster
- Southern carmine bee-eater, Merops nubicoides

== Rollers ==
Order: Coraciiformes Family: Coraciidae

The rollers are an Old World family of near passerine birds. They resemble crows in size and build, but are more closely related to the kingfishers and bee-eaters. They share the colourful appearance of those groups, blues and browns predominating. The two inner front toes are connected, but not the outer one. There are 11 species worldwide, five in Southern Africa.

- European roller, Coracias garrulus
- Lilac-breasted roller, Coracias caudatus
- Racket-tailed roller, Coracias spatulatus
- Purple roller, Coracias naevius
- Broad-billed roller, Eurystomus glaucurus

== Hornbills ==
Order: Coraciiformes Family: Bucerotidae

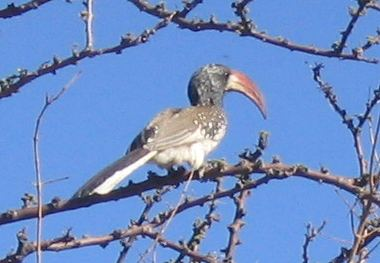
Monteiro's hornbill is a near-endemic that ranges to Angola.

Hornbills are a group of birds that have bills shaped like a cow's horn, but without a twist, sometimes with a casque on the upper mandible. Frequently, the bill is brightly coloured.

- Monteiro's hornbill, Tockus monteiri
- Southern red-billed hornbill, Tockus rufirostris
- Damara red-billed hornbill, Tockus damarensis
- Southern yellow-billed hornbill, Tockus leucomelas
- Crowned hornbill, Tockus alboterminatus
- Bradfield's hornbill, Tockus bradfieldi
- African grey hornbill, Tockus nasutus
- Trumpeter hornbill, Bycanistes bucinator
- Silvery-cheeked hornbill, Bycanistes brevis
- Southern ground-hornbill, Bucorvus leadbeateri

== Hoopoe ==
Order: Coraciiformes Family: Upupidae

- African hoopoe, Upupa epops africana

== Wood hoopoes and scimitarbills ==
Order: Coraciiformes Family: Phoeniculidae

Wood hoopoes have metallic plumage, often blue, green or purple, and lack an erectile crest. They are more gregarious than the hoopoe, and can often be seen in small groups. There are seven species worldwide, three in Southern Africa.

- Green wood hoopoe, Phoeniculus purpureus
- Violet wood hoopoe, Phoeniculus damarensis
- Common scimitarbill, Rhinopomastus cyanomelas

== Honeyguides ==
Order: Piciformes Family: Indicatoridae

Most honeyguides are dull-coloured, though a few have bright yellow in their plumage. All have light outer tail feathers, which are white in all the African species. There are 17 species worldwide, six in Southern Africa.

- Scaly-throated honeyguide, Indicator variegatus
- Greater honeyguide, Indicator indicator
- Lesser honeyguide, Indicator minor
- Pallid honeyguide, Indicator meliphilus
- Green-backed honeybird, Prodotiscus zambesiae
- Brown-backed honeybird, Prodotiscus regulus

== Barbets and tinkerbirds ==
Order: Piciformes Family: Lybiidae

The barbets and tinkerbirds are plump birds, with short necks and large heads. They get their name from the bristles that fringe their heavy bills. Most species are brightly coloured. Most species of barbet live in tropical forests, though several species of African barbet inhabit woodlands, scrub and even semi-arid environments. There are 84 species worldwide, ten in Southern Africa.

- White-eared barbet, Stactolaema leucotis
- Whyte's barbet, Stactolaema whytii
- Green barbet, Stactolaema olivacea
- Green tinkerbird, Pogoniulus simplex
- Yellow-rumped tinkerbird, Pogoniulus bilineatus
- Yellow-fronted tinkerbird, Pogoniulus chrysoconus
- Red-fronted tinkerbird, Pogoniulus pusillus
- Acacia pied barbet, Tricholaema leucomelas
- Black-collared barbet, Lybius torquatus
- Crested barbet, Trachyphonus vaillantii

== Woodpeckers and wrynecks ==
Order: Piciformes Family: Picidae

Woodpeckers and wrynecks are small to medium-sized birds with chisel-like beaks, short legs, stiff tails and long tongues used for capturing insects. Some species have feet with two toes pointing forward and two backward, while several species have only three toes. Many woodpeckers have the habit of tapping noisily on tree trunks with their beaks.

- Rufous-necked wryneck, Jynx ruficollis
- Bennett's woodpecker, Campethera bennettii
- Speckle-throated woodpecker, Campethera scriptoricauda
- Golden-tailed woodpecker, Campethera abingoni
- Knysna woodpecker, Campethera notata - endemic
- Green-backed woodpecker, Campethera cailliautii
- Ground woodpecker, Geocolaptes olivaceus - endemic
- Cardinal woodpecker, Dendropicos fuscescens
- Olive woodpecker, Dendropicos griseocephalus
- Bearded woodpecker, Chloropicus namaquus

== Larks ==
Order: Passeriformes Family: Alaudidae

Larks are small terrestrial birds with often extravagant songs and display flights. Most larks are fairly dull in appearance. They feed on insects and seeds. There are 94 species worldwide, 31 in Southern Africa.

- Monotonous lark, Mirafra passerina - near-endemic
- Melodious lark, Mirafra cheniana - endemic
- Rufous-naped lark, Mirafra africana
- Flappet lark, Mirafra rufocinnamomea
- Cape clapper lark, Mirafra apiata - endemic
- Eastern clapper lark, Mirafra fasciolata - near-endemic
- Rudd's lark, Heteromirafra ruddi - endemic
- Sabota lark, Calendulauda sabota - near-endemic
- Fawn-coloured lark, Calendulauda africanoides - near-endemic
- Red lark, Calendulauda burra - endemic
- Karoo lark, Calendulauda albescens - endemic
- Barlow's lark, Calendulauda barlowi - endemic
- Dune lark, Calendulauda erythrochlamys - endemic
- Dusky lark, Pinarocorys nigricans
- Gray's lark, Ammomanopsis grayi - near-endemic
- Spike-heeled lark, Chersomanes albofasciata - near-endemic
- Cape long-billed lark, Certhilauda curvirostris - endemic
- Agulhas long-billed lark, Certhilauda brevirostris - endemic
- Eastern long-billed lark, Certhilauda semitorquata - endemic
- Karoo long-billed lark, Certhilauda subcoronata - endemic
- Benguela long-billed lark, Certhilauda benguelensis - near-endemic
- Short-clawed lark, Certhilauda chuana - endemic
- Red-capped lark, Calandrella cinerea
- Stark's lark, Spizocorys starki - near-endemic
- Pink-billed lark, Spizocorys conirostris - near-endemic
- Botha's lark, Spizocorys fringillaris - endemic
- Sclater's lark, Spizocorys sclateri - endemic
- Large-billed lark, Galerida magnirostris - endemic
- Black-eared sparrow-lark, Eremopterix australis - endemic
- Chestnut-backed sparrow-lark, Eremopterix leucotis
- Grey-backed sparrow-lark, Eremopterix verticalis - near-endemic

== Swallows and martins ==
Order: Passeriformes Family: Hirundinidae

The family Hirundinidae is adapted to aerial feeding. They have a slender streamlined body, long pointed wings and a short bill with a wide gape. The feet are adapted to perching rather than walking, and the front toes are partially joined at the base. There are 75 species worldwide, 22 in Southern Africa.

- Sand martin, Riparia riparia
- Brown-throated martin, Riparia paludicola
- Banded martin, Riparia cincta
- Mascarene martin, Phedina borbonica
- Grey-rumped swallow, Pseudhirundo griseopyga
- Barn swallow, Hirundo rustica
- Angola swallow, Hirundo angolensis
- White-throated swallow, Hirundo albigularis
- Wire-tailed swallow, Hirundo smithii
- Blue swallow, Hirundo atrocaerulea
- Pearl-breasted swallow, Hirundo dimidiata
- Greater striped swallow, Hirundo cucullata
- Lesser striped swallow, Hirundo abyssinica
- Rufous-chested swallow, Hirundo semirufa
- Mosque swallow, Hirundo senegalensis
- Red-rumped swallow, Hirundo daurica
- South African cliff swallow, Hirundo spilodera
- Rock martin, Hirundo fuligula
- Common house martin, Delichon urbicum
- White-headed saw-wing, Psalidoprocne albiceps
- Black saw-wing, Psalidoprocne holomelaena
- Eastern saw-wing, Psalidoprocne orientalis

== Drongos and flycatchers ==
Order: Passeriformes Family: Dicruridae

The family Dicruridae is a relatively recent grouping of a number of seemingly very different birds, mostly from the Southern Hemisphere, which are more closely related than they at first appear. There are 139 species worldwide, six in Southern Africa.

=== Subfamily: Dicrurinae ===
- Square-tailed drongo, Dicrurus ludwigii
- Fork-tailed drongo, Dicrurus adsimilis

=== Subfamily: Monarchinae ===
- African crested flycatcher, Trochocercus cyanomelas
- African paradise flycatcher, Terpsiphone viridis
- Livingstone's flycatcher, Erythrocercus livingstonei
- White-tailed crested flycatcher, Elminia albonotata

== Old World flycatchers ==
Order: Passeriformes Family: Muscicapidae

Old World flycatchers are a large group of small passerine birds native to the Old World. They are mainly small arboreal insectivores. The appearance of these birds is highly varied, but they mostly have weak songs and harsh calls.

- Cape rock thrush, Monticola rupestris - endemic
- Sentinel rock thrush, Monticola explorator
- Short-toed rock thrush, Monticola brevipes
- Miombo rock thrush, Monticola angolensis
- Pale flycatcher, Bradornis pallidus
- Chat flycatcher, Bradornis infuscatus
- Mariqua flycatcher, Bradornis mariquensis
- Southern black flycatcher, Melaenornis pammelaina
- Fiscal flycatcher, Sigelus silens
- Spotted flycatcher, Muscicapa striata
- African dusky flycatcher, Muscicapa adusta
- Ashy flycatcher, Muscicapa caerulescens
- Grey tit-flycatcher, Myioparus plumbeus
- Collared flycatcher, Ficedula albicollis
- White-starred robin, Pogonocichla stellata
- Swynnerton's robin, Swynnertonia swynnertoni
- East coast akalat, Sheppardia gunningi
- Thrush nightingale, Luscinia luscinia - accidental
- Cape robin-chat, Cossypha caffra
- White-throated robin-chat, Cossypha humeralis
- White-browed robin-chat, Cossypha heuglini
- Red-capped robin-chat, Cossypha natalensis
- Chorister robin-chat, Cossypha dichroa
- Collared palm thrush, Cichladusa arquata
- Rufous-tailed palm thrush, Cichladusa ruficauda
- Bearded scrub robin, Cercotrichas quadrivirgata
- Brown scrub robin, Cercotrichas signata
- Red-backed scrub robin, Cercotrichas leucophrys
- Kalahari scrub robin, Cercotrichas paena
- Karoo scrub robin, Cercotrichas coryphoeus
- Herero chat, Namibornis herero
- Common redstart, Phoenicurus phoenicurus - accidental
- Whinchat, Saxicola rubetra
- African stonechat, Saxicola torquatus
- Buff-streaked chat, Campicoloides bifasciatus
- Mountain wheatear, Oenanthe monticola
- Northern wheatear, Oenanthe oenanthe - accidental
- Pied wheatear, Oenanthe pleschanka - accidental
- Capped wheatear, Oenanthe pileata
- Isabelline wheatear, Oenanthe isabellina
- Sickle-winged chat, Cercomela sinuata
- Karoo chat, Cercomela schlegelii
- Tractrac chat, Cercomela tractrac
- Familiar chat, Cercomela familiaris
- Southern anteater chat, Myrmecocichla formicivora
- White-headed black-chat, Myrmecocichla arnotti
- Mocking cliff chat, Thamnolaea cinnamomeiventris
- Boulder chat, Pinarornis plumosus

== Cuckooshrikes ==
Order: Passeriformes Family: Campephagidae

Cuckooshrikes are medium to small arboreal birds, generally long and slender. They are predominantly greyish with white and black. There are 84 species worldwide, three in Southern Africa.

- White-breasted cuckooshrike, Coracina pectoralis
- Grey cuckooshrike, Coracina caesia
- Black cuckooshrike, Campephaga flava

== Orioles ==
Order: Passeriformes Family: Oriolidae

Orioles are colourful Old World passerine birds in the family Oriolidae. They are not related to the New World orioles, which are icterids, family Icteridae. There are 25 species worldwide, four in Southern Africa.

- Eurasian golden oriole, Oriolus oriolus
- African golden oriole, Oriolus auratus
- Green-headed oriole, Oriolus chlorocephalus
- Black-headed oriole, Oriolus larvatus

== Ravens and crows ==
Order: Passeriformes Family: Corvidae

Ravens and crows are medium to large birds with strong feet and bills, rictal bristles and a single moult each year (most passerines moult twice). There are 120 species worldwide, four in Southern Africa.

- House crow, Corvus splendens - introduced
- Cape crow, Corvus capensis
- Pied crow, Corvus albus
- White-necked raven, Corvus albicollis

== Tits ==
Order: Passeriformes Family: Paridae

The tits, chickadees and titmice, family Paridae, are a large family of small passerine birds, mainly small stocky woodland species with short stout bills. Some have crests. They are adaptable birds, with a mixed diet including seeds and insects. Many species live around human habitation and come readily to bird feeders for nuts or seeds, and can learn to take other foods. There are 59 species worldwide, five in Southern Africa.

- Southern black tit, Parus niger
- Rufous-bellied tit, Parus rufiventris
- Miombo tit, Parus griseiventris
- Ashy tit, Parus cinerascens
- Grey tit, Parus afer

== Penduline tits ==
Order: Passeriformes Family: Remizidae

There are 15 species worldwide, two in Southern Africa.

- Cape penduline tit, Anthoscopus minutus
- African penduline tit, Anthoscopus caroli

== Spotted creeper ==
Order: Passeriformes Family: Certhiidae

Subfamily: Salpornithinae

- Spotted creeper, Salpornis salvadori

== Laughingthrushes ==
Order: Passeriformes Family: Leiothrichidae

- Black-faced babbler, Turdoides melanops
- Hartlaub's babbler, Turdoides hartlaubii
- Southern pied babbler, Turdoides bicolor
- Arrow-marked babbler, Turdoides jardineii
- Bare-cheeked babbler, Turdoides gymnogenys

== Bulbuls and nicators ==
Order: Passeriformes Family: Pycnonotidae

Bulbuls and nicators are mostly frugivorous birds. Some are colourful with yellow, red or orange vents, cheeks, throats or supercilia, but most are drab, with uniform olive-brown to black plumage. Some have very distinct crests. Many of these species inhabit tree tops, while some are restricted to the undergrowth. Up to five purple-pink eggs are laid in an open tree nests and incubated by the female. There are 130 species worldwide, ten in Southern Africa.

- Dark-capped bulbul, Pycnonotus tricolor
- African red-eyed bulbul, Pycnonotus nigricans
- Cape bulbul, Pycnonotus capensis - endemic
- Sombre greenbul, Andropadus importunus
- Stripe-cheeked greenbul, Andropadus milanjensis
- Yellow-bellied greenbul, Chlorocichla flaviventris
- Terrestrial brownbul, Phyllastrephus terrestris
- Yellow-streaked greenbul, Phyllastrephus flavostriatus
- Lowland tiny greenbul, Phyllastrephus debilis
- Eastern nicator, Nicator gularis

== Thrushes ==
Order: Passeriformes Family: Turdidae

The thrushes are a group of passerine birds that occur mainly but not exclusively in the Old World. They are plump, soft plumaged, small to medium-sized insectivores or sometimes omnivores, often feeding on the ground. Many have attractive songs.

- Orange ground thrush, Geokichla gurneyi
- Spotted ground thrush, Geokichla guttata
- Groundscraper thrush, Psophocichla litsitsirupa
- Kurrichane thrush, Turdus libonyanus
- Olive thrush, Turdus olivaceus
- Karoo thrush, Turdus smithi
- White-chested alethe, Pseudalethe fuelleborni

== African warblers ==
Order: Passeriformes Family: Macrosphenidae

- Moustached grass warbler, Melocichla mentalis
- Victorin's warbler, Cryptillas victorini - endemic
- Red-capped crombec, Sylvietta ruficapilla
- Red-faced crombec, Sylvietta whytii
- Long-billed crombec, Sylvietta rufescens
- Rockrunner, Achaetops pycnopygius
- Cape grassbird, Sphenoeacus afer
- Cape rockjumper, Chaetops frenatus - endemic
- Drakensberg rockjumper, Chaetops aurantius - endemic

== Locustellid warblers ==
Order: Passeriformes Family: Locustellidae

- Broad-tailed warbler, Schoenicola brevirostris
- River warbler, Locustella fluviatilis
- Little rush warbler, Bradypterus baboecala
- Knysna warbler, Bradypterus sylvaticus - endemic
- Barratt's warbler, Bradypterus barratti

== Old World warblers ==
Order: Passeriformes Family: Sylviidae

The Old World warblers are of generally undistinguished appearance, but many have distinctive songs.

- Garden warbler, Sylvia borin
- Common whitethroat, Sylvia communis
- Eurasian blackcap, Sylvia atricapilla - accidental
- Layard's warbler, Sylvia layardi
- Chestnut-vented warbler, Sylvia subcaerulea
- Bush blackcap, Lioptilus nigricapillus

== Acrocephalid warblers ==
Order: Passeriformes Family: Acrocephalidae

- Sedge warbler, Acrocephalus schoenobaenus
- Eurasian reed warbler, Acrocephalus scirpaceus
- African reed warbler, Acrocephalus baeticatus
- Marsh warbler, Acrocephalus palustris
- Great reed warbler, Acrocephalus arundinaceus
- Basra reed warbler, Acrocephalus griseldis - accidental
- Greater swamp warbler, Acrocephalus rufescens
- Lesser swamp warbler, Acrocephalus gracilirostris
- Olive-tree warbler, Hippolais olivetorum
- Icterine warbler, Hippolais icterina
- African yellow warbler, Iduna natalensis

== Phylloscopid warblers ==
Order: Passeriformes Family: Phylloscopidae

- Yellow-throated woodland warbler, Phylloscopus ruficapilla
- Willow warbler, Phylloscopus trochilus

== Hyliotid warblers ==
- Yellow-bellied hyliota, Hyliota flavigaster
- Southern hyliota, Hyliota australis

== Fairy flycatchers ==
Order: Passeriformes Family: Stenostiridae

- Fairy flycatcher, Stenostira scita

== Apalises, cisticolas and prinias ==
Order: Passeriformes Family: Cisticolidae

Cisticolidae are generally very small birds of drab brown or grey appearance found in open country such as grassland or scrub. They are often difficult to see and many species are similar in appearance, so the song is often the best identification guide. These are insectivorous birds that nest low in vegetation. There are 110 species worldwide, 37 in Southern Africa.

=== Apalis ===
- Bar-throated apalis, Apalis thoracica
- Yellow-breasted apalis, Apalis flavida
- Rudd's apalis, Apalis ruddi
- Black-headed apalis, Apalis melanocephala
- Chirinda apalis, Apalis chirindensis

=== Cisticola ===
- Red-faced cisticola, Cisticola erythrops
- Singing cisticola, Cisticola cantans
- Lazy cisticola, Cisticola aberrans
- Rattling cisticola, Cisticola chiniana
- Tinkling cisticola, Cisticola rufilatus
- Grey-backed cisticola, Cisticola subruficapilla
- Wailing cisticola, Cisticola lais
- Winding cisticola, Cisticola galactotes
- Luapula cisticola, Cisticola luapula
- Chirping cisticola, Cisticola pipiens
- Levaillant's cisticola, Cisticola tinniens
- Croaking cisticola, Cisticola natalensis
- Neddicky, Cisticola fulvicapilla
- Siffling cisticola, Cisticola brachypterus
- Zitting cisticola, Cisticola juncidis
- Desert cisticola, Cisticola aridulus
- Cloud cisticola, Cisticola textrix
- Pale-crowned cisticola, Cisticola cinnamomeus
- Wing-snapping cisticola, Cisticola ayresii

=== Prinia ===
- Tawny-flanked prinia, Prinia subflava
- Black-chested prinia, Prinia flavicans
- Karoo prinia, Prinia maculosa
- Drakensberg prinia, Prinia hypoxantha
- Red-winged prinia, Prinia erythroptera

=== Camaroptera ===
- Green-backed camaroptera, Camaroptera brachyura
- Grey-backed camaroptera, Camaroptera brevicaudata

=== Eremomela ===
- Yellow-bellied eremomela, Eremomela icteropygialis
- Greencap eremomela, Eremomela scotops
- Karoo eremomela, Eremomela gregalis
- Burnt-necked eremomela, Eremomela usticollis

=== Warbler ===
- Barred wren-warbler, Calamonastes fasciolatus
- Stierling's wren-warbler, Calamonastes stierlingi
- Cinnamon-breasted warbler, Euryptila subcinnamomea
- Namaqua warbler, Phragmacia substriata
- Briar warbler, Oreophilais robertsi
- Rufous-eared warbler, Malcorus pectoralis

== White-eyes ==
Order: Passeriformes Family: Zosteropidae

White-eyes are mostly of undistinguished appearance, the plumage above being generally either mouse-coloured or greenish-olive, but some species have a white or bright yellow throat, breast or lower parts, and several have buff flanks. They have rounded wings and strong legs. The size ranges up to 15 cm (6 in) in length. There are 97 species worldwide, three in Southern Africa.

- African yellow white-eye, Zosterops senegalensis
- Cape white-eye, Zosterops virens
- Orange River white-eye, Zosterops pallidus

== Wattle-eyes ==
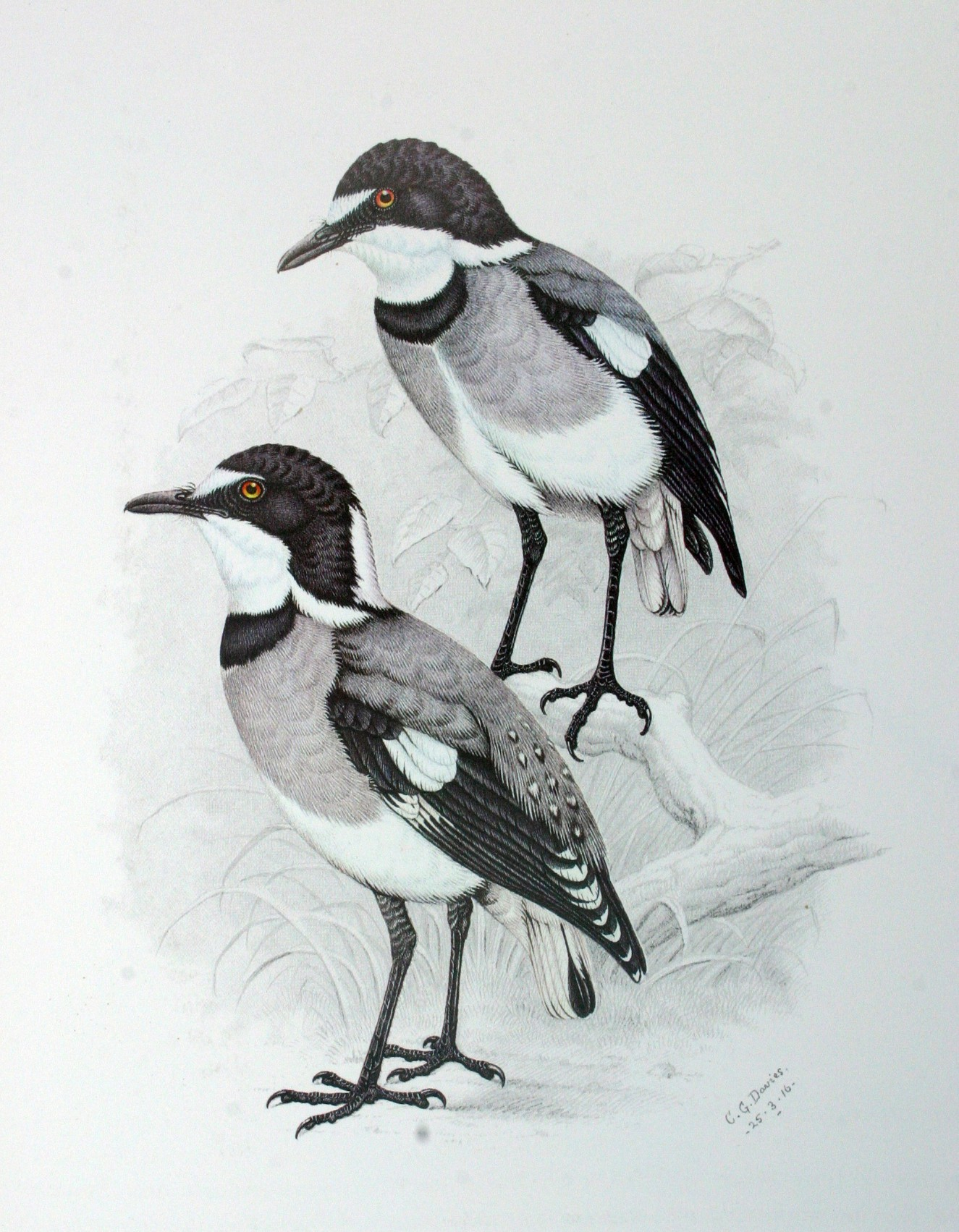
The unique white-tailed shrike ranges to Angola

Order: Passeriformes Family: Platysteiridae

Wattle-eyes get their name from the brightly coloured fleshy eye decorations found in most species in this group. These insect-eating birds are found in usually open forests or bush. They hunt by flycatching, or by taking prey from the ground like a shrike. There are 30 species worldwide, eight in Southern Africa.

- Black-and-white flycatcher, Bias musicus
- White-tailed shrike, Lanioturdus torquatus
- Cape batis, Batis capensis
- Woodward's batis, Batis fratrum
- Chinspot batis, Batis molitor
- Pale batis, Batis soror
- Pririt batis, Batis pririt
- Black-throated wattle-eye, Platysteira peltata

== Wagtails, longclaws and pipits ==
Order: Passeriformes Family: Motacillidae

Motacillidae is a family of small passerine birds with medium to long tails. They include the wagtails, longclaws and pipits. They are slender, ground feeding insectivores of open country. They are ground nesters, laying up to six speckled eggs. There are 60 species worldwide, 25 in Southern Africa.

=== Wagtails ===
- African pied wagtail, Motacilla aguimp
- Cape wagtail, Motacilla capensis
- Yellow wagtail, Motacilla flava
- Citrine wagtail, Motacilla citreola
- Grey wagtail, Motacilla cinerea - accidental
- Mountain wagtail, Motacilla clara

=== Pipits ===
- Golden pipit, Tmetothylacus tenellus - accidental
- Yellow-breasted pipit, Anthus chloris - endemic
- Striped pipit, Anthus lineiventris
- African rock pipit, Anthus crenatus
- African pipit, Anthus cinnamomeus
- Mountain pipit, Anthus hoeschi
- Plain-backed pipit, Anthus leucophrys
- Buffy pipit, Anthus vaalensis
- Long-tailed pipit, Anthus longicaudatus - endemic
- Long-billed pipit, Anthus similis
- Kimberley pipit, Anthus pseudosimilis
- Wood pipit, Anthus nyassae
- Short-tailed pipit, Anthus brachyurus
- Bush pipit, Anthus caffer
- Tree pipit, Anthus trivialis
- Red-throated pipit, Anthus cervinus - accidental

=== Longclaws ===
- Yellow-throated longclaw, Macronyx croceus
- Cape longclaw, Macronyx capensis
- Rosy-throated longclaw, Macronyx ameliae

== Shrikes ==
Order: Passeriformes Family: Laniidae

A shrike is a passerine bird of the family Laniidae known for catching insects, small birds or mammals, and impaling their bodies on thorns. This helps them tear the flesh into small convenient fragments, and serves as a "larder" so that the shrike can return to feed later. A typical shrike's beak is hooked, like a bird of prey, reflecting its predatory nature. There are 32 species worldwide, six in Southern Africa.

- Red-backed shrike, Lanius collurio
- Souza's shrike, Lanius souzae
- Lesser grey shrike, Lanius minor
- Southern fiscal, Lanius collaris
- Magpie shrike, Corvinella melanoleuca
- Southern white-crowned shrike, Eurocephalus anguitimens

== Helmet-shrikes ==
Order: Passeriformes Family: Prionopidae

The helmetshrikes are smallish passerine bird species. They were formerly classified with the true shrikes in the family Laniidae, but are now considered sufficiently distinctive to separate from that group as the family Prionopidae. There are 11 species worldwide, three in Southern Africa.

- White helmetshrike, Prionops plumatus
- Retz's helmetshrike, Prionops retzii
- Chestnut-fronted helmetshrike, Prionops scopifrons

== Bush-shrikes and tchagras ==
Order: Passeriformes Family: Malaconotidae

The bush-shrikes, boubous and tchagras are smallish passerine bird species. They were formerly classed with the true shrikes in the family Laniidae, but are now considered sufficiently distinctive to separate from that group as the family Malaconotidae. There are 43 species worldwide, 16 in Southern Africa.

- Bokmakierie, Telophorus zeylonus
- Sulphur-breasted bushshrike, Telophorus sulfureopectus
- Olive bushshrike, Telophorus olivaceus
- Black-fronted bushshrike, Telophorus nigrifrons
- Gorgeous bushshrike, Telophorus viridis
- Grey-headed bushshrike, Malaconotus blanchoti
- Crimson-breasted shrike, Laniarius atrococcineus
- Tropical boubou, Laniarius aethiopicus
- Swamp boubou, Laniarius bicolor
- Southern boubou, Laniarius ferrugineus
- Anchieta's tchagra, Antichromus anchietae
- Black-crowned tchagra, Tchagra senegalus
- Brown-crowned tchagra, Tchagra australis
- Southern tchagra, Tchagra tchagra
- Brubru, Nilaus afer
- Black-backed puffback, Dryoscopus cubla

== Starlings and oxpeckers ==
Order: Passeriformes Family: Sturnidae (including Buphaginae, sometimes deemed a distinct family)

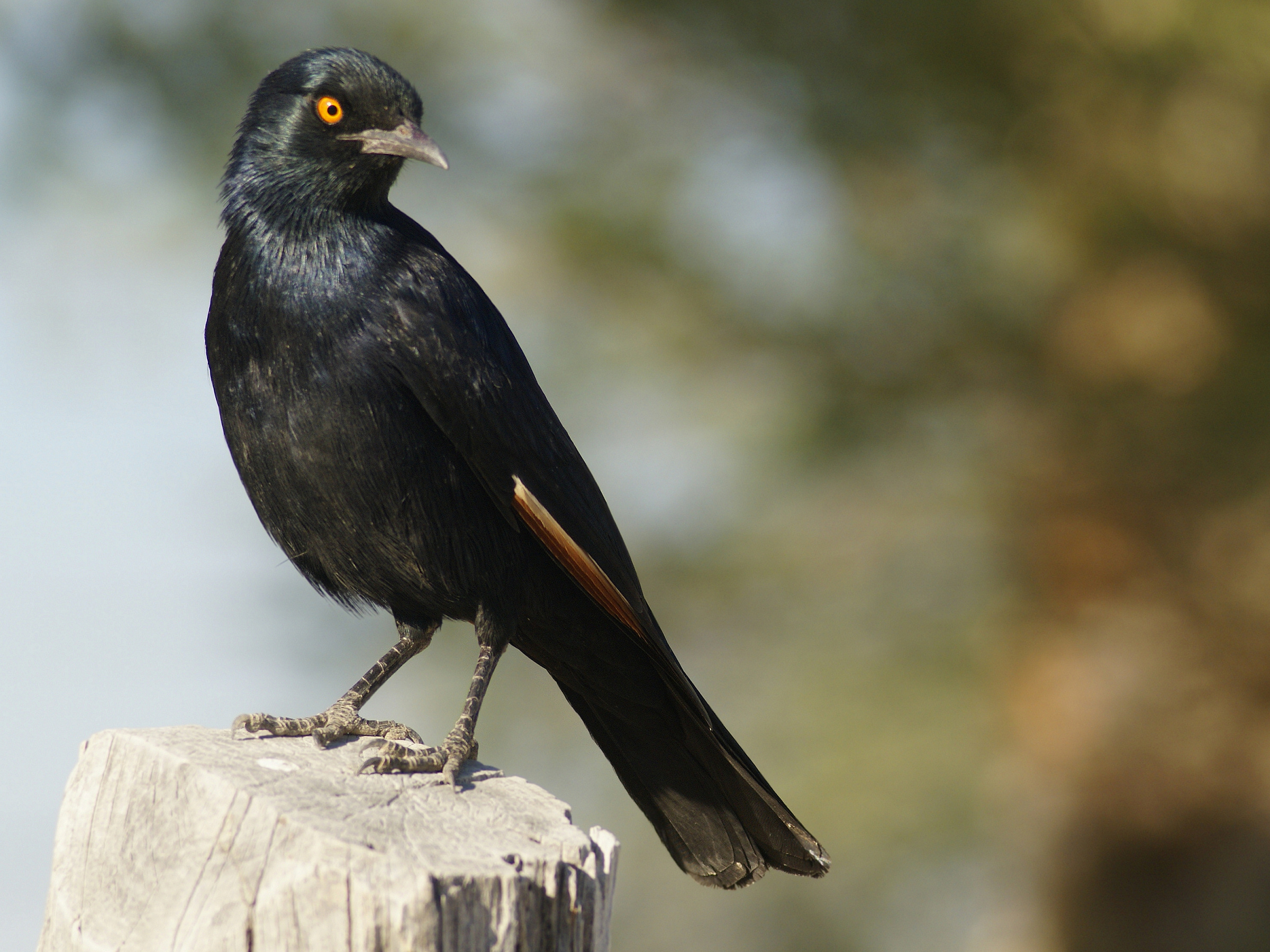
Pale-winged starling, a near-endemic to the region

Starlings and oxpeckers are small to medium-sized passerines with strong feet and pointed bills. Their flight is strong and direct and they are very gregarious. Their preferred habitat ranges from dry open to moist wooded country, and they may feed on insects, fruit or ticks. Plumage is typically dark with a metallic sheen.

- Pale-winged starling, Onychognathus nabouroup
- Golden-breasted starling, Lamprotornis regius
- Red-winged starling, Onychognathus morio
- Black-bellied starling, Notopholia corrusca
- Cape glossy starling, Lamprotornis nitens
- Greater blue-eared starling, Lamprotornis chalybaeus
- Southern blue-eared glossy-starling, Lamprotornis elisabeth
- Sharp-tailed glossy-starling, Lamprotornis acuticaudus
- Burchell's starling, Lamprotornis australis
- Meves's starling, Lamprotornis mevesii
- Pied starling, Lamprotornis bicolor
- Violet-backed starling, Cinnyricinclus leucogaster
- Wattled starling, Creatophora cinerea
- Common starling, Sturnus vulgaris - introduced
- Common myna, Acridotheres tristis - introduced
- Yellow-billed oxpecker, Buphagus africanus
- Red-billed oxpecker, Buphagus erythrorhynchus

== Sugarbirds ==
Order: Passeriformes Family: Promeropidae

The two species of sugarbird make up one of only two bird families restricted entirely to Southern Africa, the other being the rock-jumpers Chaetopidae. They are specialist nectar feeders, but also eat insects. They have dull streaky plumage and long tails. The songs are a jumble of metallic-sounding notes.

- Gurney's sugarbird, Promerops gurneyi - endemic
- Cape sugarbird, Promerops cafer - endemic

== Sunbirds ==
Order: Passeriformes Family: Nectariniidae (which includes spiderhunters in Asia)

The sunbirds are very small passerine birds that feed largely on nectar, though they also take insects, especially when feeding young. Flight is fast and direct on their short wings. Most species can feed while hovering like a hummingbird, but they mostly perch. Strong sexual dimorphism is typical, with males brilliant and females drab. Approximately 131 species exist worldwide, 22 in Southern Africa.

- Plain-backed sunbird, Anthreptes reichenowi - accidental
- Western violet-backed sunbird, Anthreptes longuemarei
- Orange-breasted sunbird, Anthobaphes violacea - endemic
- Olive sunbird, Cyanomitra olivacea
- Mouse-coloured sunbird, Cyanomitra veroxii
- Amethyst sunbird, Chalcomitra amethystina
- Scarlet-chested sunbird, Chalcomitra senegalensis
- Bronzy sunbird, Nectarinia kilimensis
- Malachite sunbird, Nectarinia famosa
- Collared sunbird, Hedydipna collaris
- Miombo double-collared sunbird, Cinnyris manoensis
- Southern double-collared sunbird, Cinnyris chalybeus
- Greater double-collared sunbird, Cinnyris afer
- Neergaard's sunbird, Cinnyris neergaardi
- Variable sunbird, Cinnyris venustus
- White-breasted sunbird, Cinnyris talatala
- Copper sunbird, Cinnyris cupreus
- Dusky sunbird, Cinnyris fuscus
- Shelley's sunbird, Cinnyris shelleyi
- Mariqua sunbird, Cinnyris mariquensis
- Purple-banded sunbird, Cinnyris bifasciatus

== Sparrows ==
The great sparrow is a near-endemic to the region

Order: Passeriformes Family: Passeridae

Sparrows are small passerine birds. In general, sparrows tend to be small plump brownish or greyish birds with short tails and short powerful beaks. They are monogamous and build conspicuous nests. Sparrows are granivorous, but also consume small insects. There are 35 species worldwide, six in Southern Africa.

- House sparrow, Passer domesticus - introduced
- Great sparrow, Passer motitensis - near-endemic
- Cape sparrow, Passer melanurus - near-endemic
- Southern grey-headed sparrow, Passer diffusus
- Northern grey-headed sparrow, Passer griseus
- Yellow-throated petronia, Petronia superciliaris

== Weavers to widowbirds ==
Order: Passeriformes Family: Ploceidae

Weavers, queleas, bishops and widowbirds are small, gregarious passerine birds related to finches. Most inhabit sub-Saharan Africa, though a few species occur in tropical Asia. Their rounded conical bills suit their granivorous diet. Males typically acquire striking summer plumages. Queleas, bishops and weavers are colonial nesters, and the latter group weaves conspicuous suspended nests. Widowbirds to the contrary are solitary, terrestrial nesters, but flock in winter. Of the 114 species worldwide, 27 exist in Southern Africa.

- Red-billed buffalo weaver, Bubalornis niger
- White-browed sparrow-weaver, Plocepasser mahali
- Sociable weaver, Philetairus socius
- Lesser masked weaver, Ploceus intermedius
- Spectacled weaver, Ploceus ocularis
- Cape weaver, Ploceus capensis - endemic
- Yellow weaver, Ploceus subaureus
- Holub's golden weaver, Ploceus xanthops
- Southern brown-throated weaver, Ploceus xanthopterus
- Southern masked weaver, Ploceus velatus
- Village weaver, Ploceus cucullatus
- Chestnut weaver, Ploceus rubiginosus
- Dark-backed weaver, Ploceus bicolor
- Olive-headed weaver, Ploceus olivaceiceps
- Red-headed weaver, Anaplectes melanotis
- Thick-billed weaver, Amblyospiza albifrons
- Red-headed quelea, Quelea erythrops
- Red-billed quelea, Quelea quelea
- Yellow-crowned bishop, Euplectes afer
- Black-winged red bishop, Euplectes hordeaceus
- Southern red bishop, Euplectes orix
- Yellow bishop, Euplectes capensis
- Fan-tailed widowbird, Euplectes axillaris
- Yellow-mantled widowbird, Euplectes macrourus
- White-winged widowbird, Euplectes albonotatus
- Red-collared widowbird, Euplectes ardens
- Long-tailed widowbird, Euplectes progne

== Whydahs and indigobirds ==
The indigobirds and whydahs, are small passerine birds native to Africa. These are finch-like species which usually have black or indigo predominating in their plumage. The whydahs have long or very long tails. All of the species are brood parasites, which lay their eggs in the nests of estrildid finches; most indigobirds use fire-finches as hosts, whereas the paradise whydahs chose pytilias. There are 19 species worldwide, eight in Southern Africa.

- Pin-tailed whydah, Vidua macroura
- Broad-tailed paradise whydah, Vidua obtusa
- Long-tailed paradise whydah, Vidua paradisaea
- Shaft-tailed whydah, Vidua regia
- Village indigobird, Vidua chalybeata
- Dusky indigobird, Vidua funerea
- Purple indigobird, Vidua purpurascens
- Twinspot indigobird, Vidua codringtoni

== Estrildid finches ==
Order: Passeriformes Family: Estrildidae

The estrildid finches are small passerine birds of the Old World tropics and Australasia. They are gregarious and often colonial seed eaters with short thick but pointed bills. They are all similar in structure and habits, but have wide variation in plumage colours and patterns.

- Green-winged pytilia, Pytilia melba
- Orange-winged pytilia, Pytilia afra - accidental
- Red-billed firefinch, Lagonosticta senegala
- African firefinch, Lagonosticta rubricata
- Jameson's firefinch, Lagonosticta rhodopareia
- Blue-breasted cordon-bleu, Uraeginthus angolensis
- Violet-eared waxbill, Uraeginthus granatina
- Black-faced waxbill, Estrilda erythronotos
- Grey waxbill, Estrilda perreini
- Cinderella waxbill, Estrilda thomensis
- Common waxbill, Estrilda astrild
- Violet-eared waxbill, Granatina granatina
- Blue waxbill, Uraeginthus angolensis
- Yellow-bellied waxbill, Coccopygia quartinia
- Swee waxbill, Coccopygia melanotis
- Zebra waxbill, Sporaeginthus subflavus
- Bronze mannikin, Spermestes cucullatus
- Black-and-white mannikin, Spermestes bicolor
- Magpie mannikin, Spermestes fringilloides
- African quailfinch, Ortygospiza atricollis
- Red-headed finch, Amadina erythrocephala
- Cut-throat finch, Amadina fasciata
- Locust finch, Paludipasser locustella
- Red-throated twinspot, Hypargos niveoguttatus
- Pink-throated twinspot, Hypargos margaritatus
- Green-backed twinspot, Mandingoa nitidula
- Red-faced crimsonwing, Cryptospiza reichenovii
- Lesser seedcracker, Pyrenestes minor

== Fringilline finches and allies ==
Order: Passeriformes Family: Fringillidae

Finches are seed-eating passerine birds, that are small to moderately large and have a strong beak, usually conical and in some species very large. All have twelve tail feathers and nine primaries. These birds have a bouncing flight with alternating bouts of flapping and gliding on closed wings, and most sing well. There are 137 species worldwide, 15 in Southern Africa.

- Common chaffinch, Fringilla coelebs - introduced
- Cape canary, Serinus canicollis
- Black-headed canary, Serinus alario
- Yellow-fronted canary, Crithagra mozambicus
- Black-throated canary, Crithagra atrogularis
- Lemon-breasted canary, Crithagra citrinipectus
- Forest canary, Crithagra scotops - endemic
- Yellow canary, Crithagra flaviventris
- Brimstone canary, Crithagra sulphuratus
- White-throated canary, Crithagra albogularis
- Protea seedeater, Crithagra leucopterus - endemic
- Streaky-headed seedeater, Crithagra gularis
- Black-eared seedeater, Crithagra mennelli
- Cape siskin, Crithagra totta - endemic
- Drakensberg siskin, Crithagra symonsi - endemic

== Buntings ==
Order: Passeriformes Family: Emberizidae

Emberizidae is a large family of passerine birds. They are seed eaters with distinctively shaped bills. Those occurring in the Old World are mostly known as buntings. In North America, most of this species are called sparrows, though the latter are not all that closely related to Old World sparrows, which belong to the family Passeridae. Emberizid species typically show distinctive head patterns. Of 275 species worldwide, five occur in Southern Africa.

- Lark-like bunting, Emberiza impetuani
- Cinnamon-breasted bunting, Emberiza tahapisi
- Cape bunting, Emberiza capensis
- Golden-breasted bunting, Emberiza flaviventris
- Cabanis's bunting, Emberiza cabanisi

== See also ==
- Endemic birds of southern Africa
- Lists of birds by region
- List of Gauteng birds
- List of African birds
- List of birds
