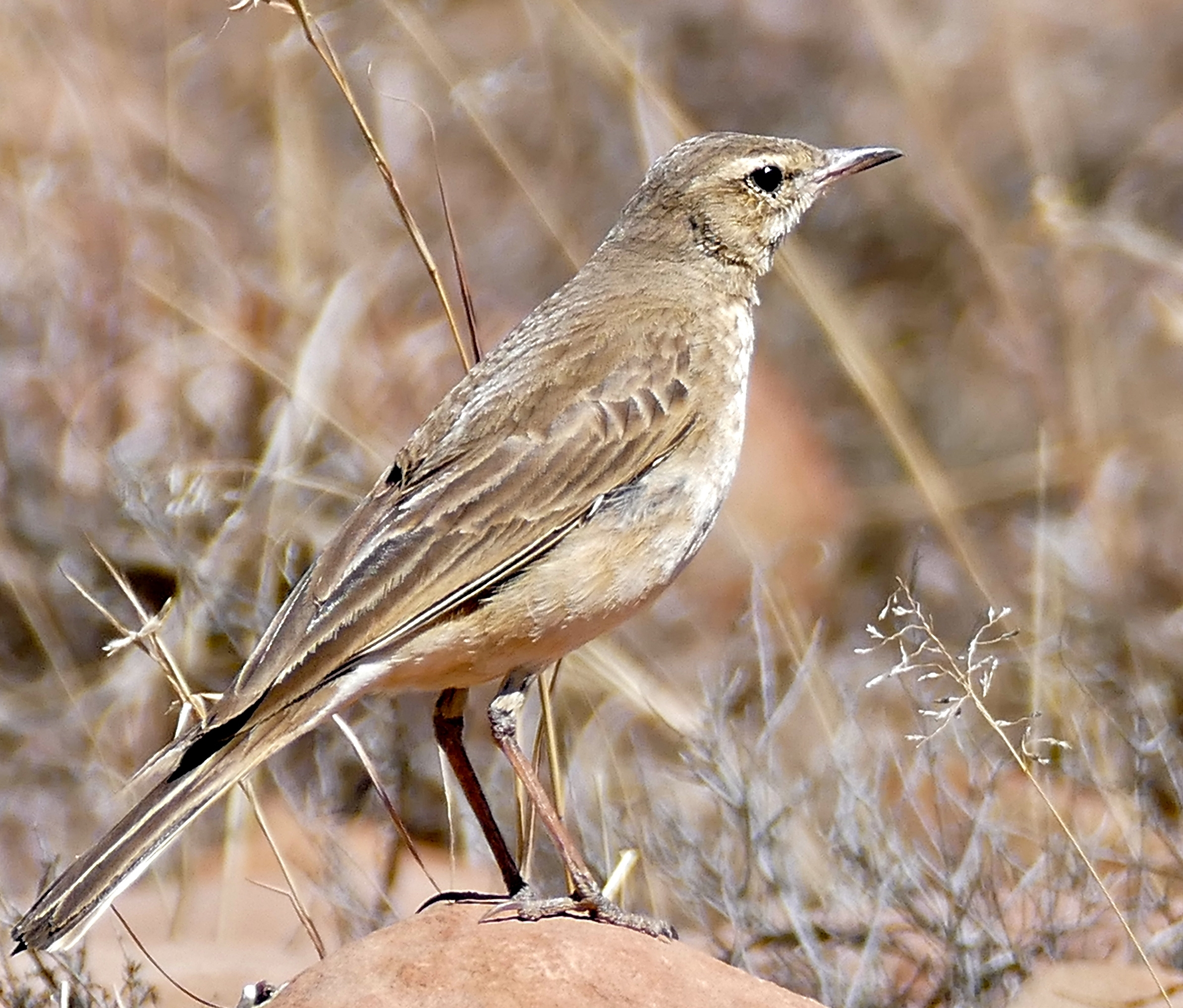
- At Mountain Zebra NP, South Africa

Conservation status
- Least Concern (IUCN 3.1)

Scientific classification
- Kingdom: Animalia
- Phylum: Chordata
- Class: Aves
- Order: Passeriformes
- Family: Motacillidae
- Genus: Anthus
- Species: A. vaalensis

Binomial name
- Anthus vaalensis Shelley, 1900

= Buffy pipit =

Species of bird

The buffy pipit (Anthus vaalensis) is a species of bird in the Motacillidae family. It is found in plains and open countryside in southern and eastern Africa. The IUCN has assessed its conservation status as being of least concern.

== Taxonomy ==
This species was described by English naturalist George Ernest Shelley in 1900. The IOC World Bird List recognises five subspecies: A. v. chobiensis in the south of the Democratic Republic of the Congo, southwestern Tanzania, northeastern Namibia, northern Botswana, Zimbabwe and western Mozambique; A. v. neumanni in central Angola; A. v. namibicus in northeastern and central Namibia; A. v. exasperatus in northeastern Botswana; and A. v. vaalensis in southern Botswana and South Africa. A. longicaudatus is an invalid taxon and is included in A. vaalensis. Some authors include subspecies saphiroi and goodsoni of the plain-backed pipit (Anthus leucophrys) in this species.

== Description ==
Its length is 16–18 cm (6.3–7.1 in), and its weight is 23–36.6 g (0.81–1.29 oz). It is often confused with the plain-backed pipit because both species have plain upperparts. The upperparts of the buffy pipit are paler and buffier than the plain-backed pipit. The buffy pipit has a pale supercilium, and its lower mandible has a pinkish base. It has faint markings on the breast, and the belly and flanks are buffy. The juvenile has mottles.

== Distribution and habitat ==
The buffy pipit is found in Angola, Botswana, Democratic Republic of the Congo, Eswatini, Malawi, Mozambique, Namibia, South Africa, Tanzania, Zambia, and Zimbabwe, with a distribution size estimated at 5,660,000 km^{2} (2,190,000 sq mi). Its habitat is semi-arid plains with grasses and bare ground. It also occurs in pastures, burnt fields, and edges of saltpans.

== Behaviour ==
One or two individuals are usually encountered, but flocks may be found in winter. It frequently wags its tail. Its song is a repeated tchreep-churup, and the call sshik is given when the bird is flushed. It eats invertebrates and seeds. Breeding has been recorded from July to February in Zimbabwe and August to December in South Africa. The nest is an open cup built on the ground.

== Status ==
The population size is not known. The species has an increasing population trend and a large range, so the IUCN Red List has assessed the species as least concern.
