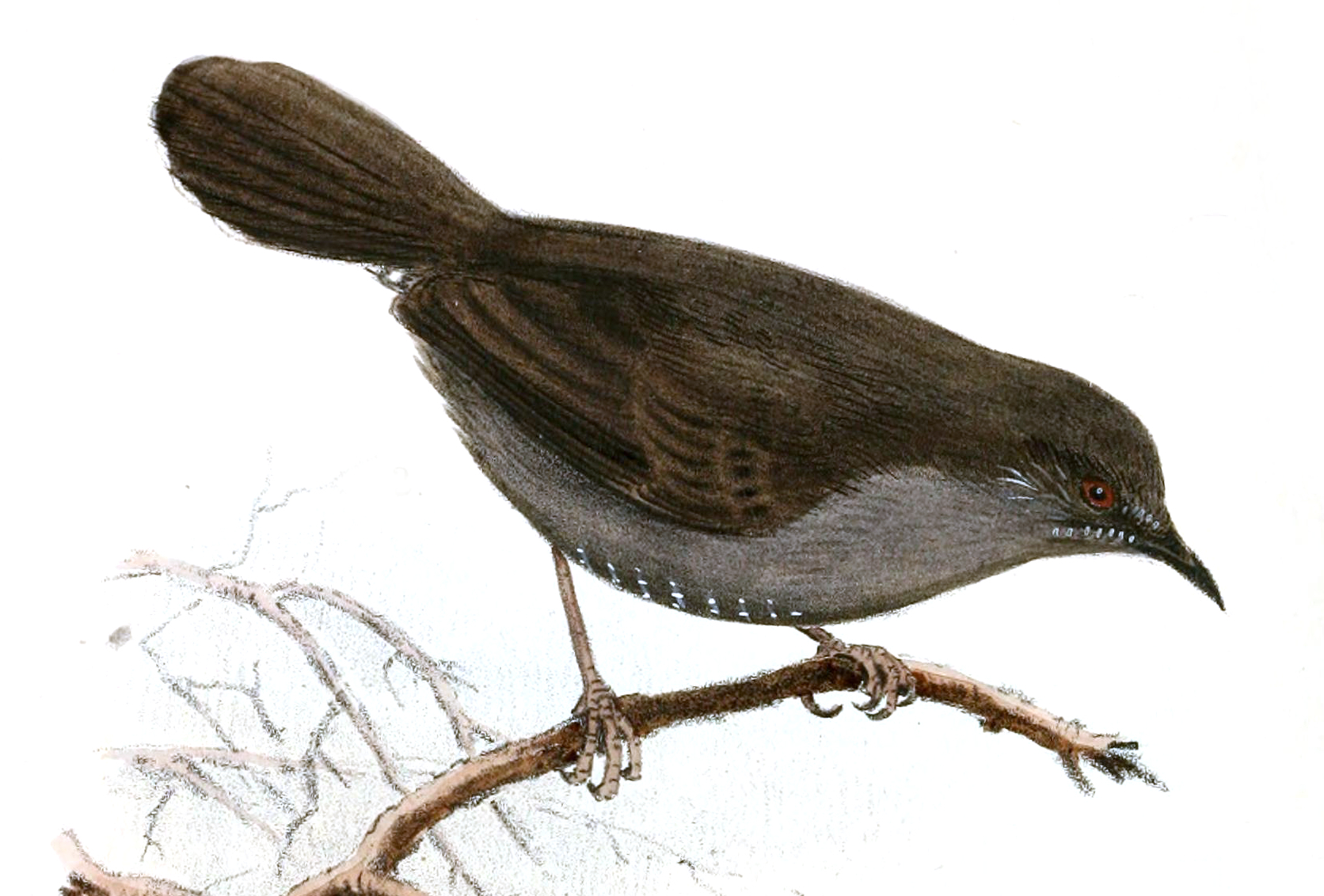

Conservation status
- Least Concern (IUCN 3.1)

Scientific classification
- Kingdom: Animalia
- Phylum: Chordata
- Class: Aves
- Order: Passeriformes
- Family: Cisticolidae
- Genus: Calamonastes
- Species: C. simplex

Binomial name
- Calamonastes simplex (Cabanis, 1878)

Synonyms
- Camaroptera simplex

Audio
- Calls recorded in Maungo, Kenya

= Grey wren-warbler =

Species of bird

The grey wren-warbler (Calamonastes simplex) is a species of bird in the family Cisticolidae. It is found in Angola, Burundi, Democratic Republic of the Congo, Ethiopia, Kenya, Malawi, Rwanda, Somalia, South Sudan, Tanzania, Uganda, and Zambia. Its natural habitat is dry savanna.

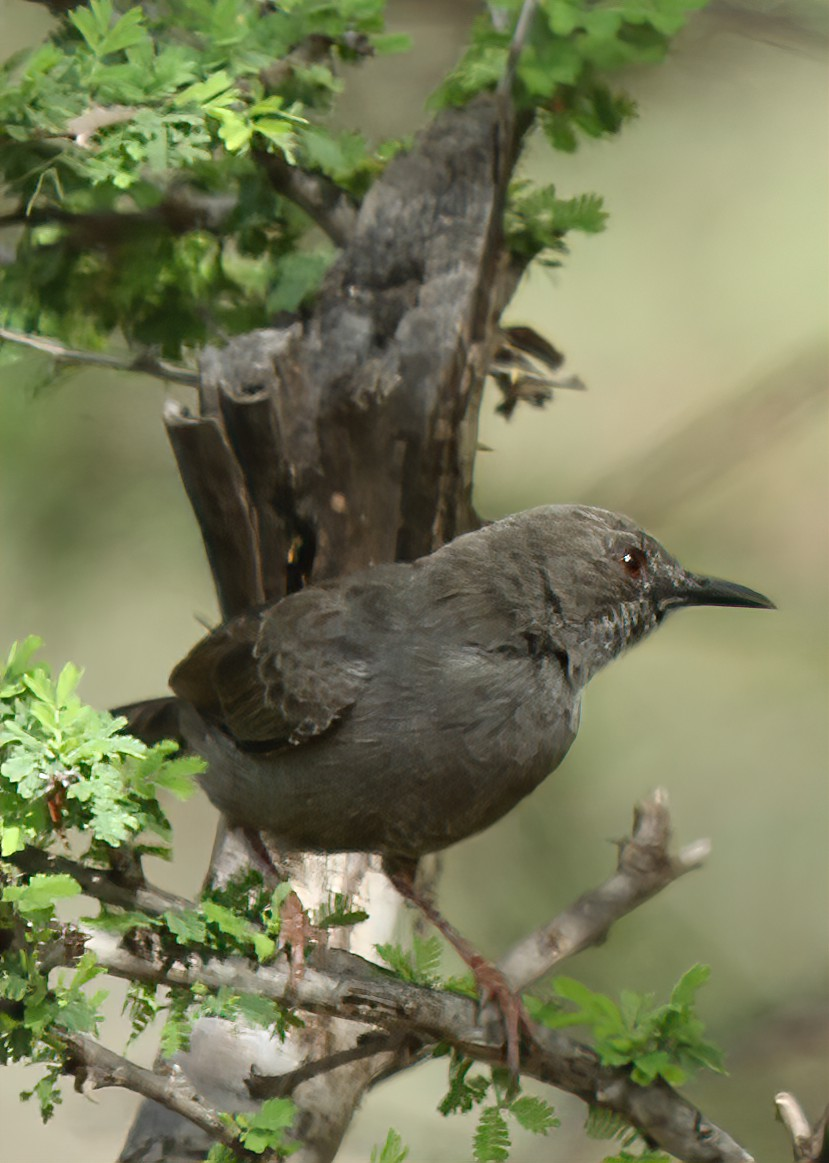
Grey wren-warbler at Lake Bogoria - Kenya

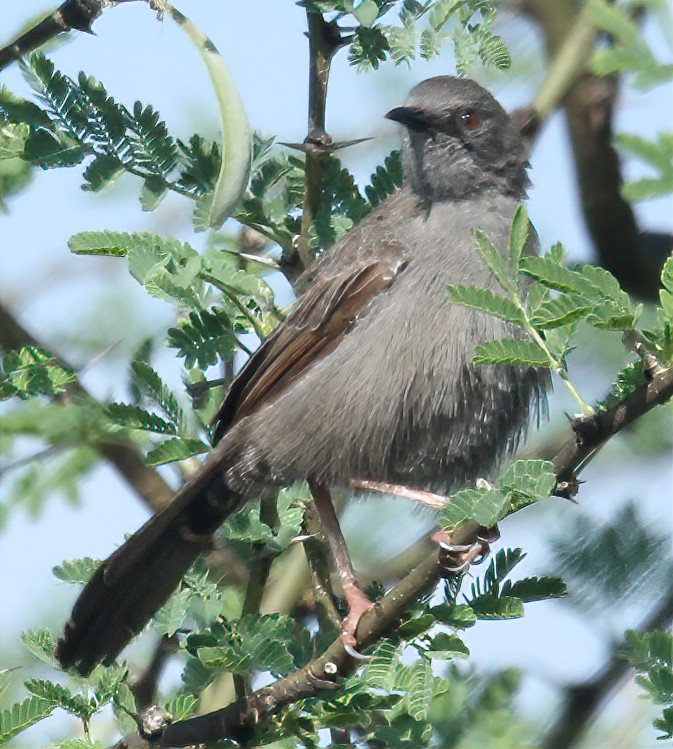
Grey wren-warbler (ventral view) at Lake Bogoria - Kenya

The grey wren-warbler is a shy bird found in dense bush and undergrowth. It is normally found singly or in pairs and is a dark brownish-grey with inconspicuous barred markings. The tail is black and the eye red. It is more likely to be heard than seen though there may be an occasional glimpse of its tail which wags up and down as it forages. Its sharp call is rather like two stones striking each other.
