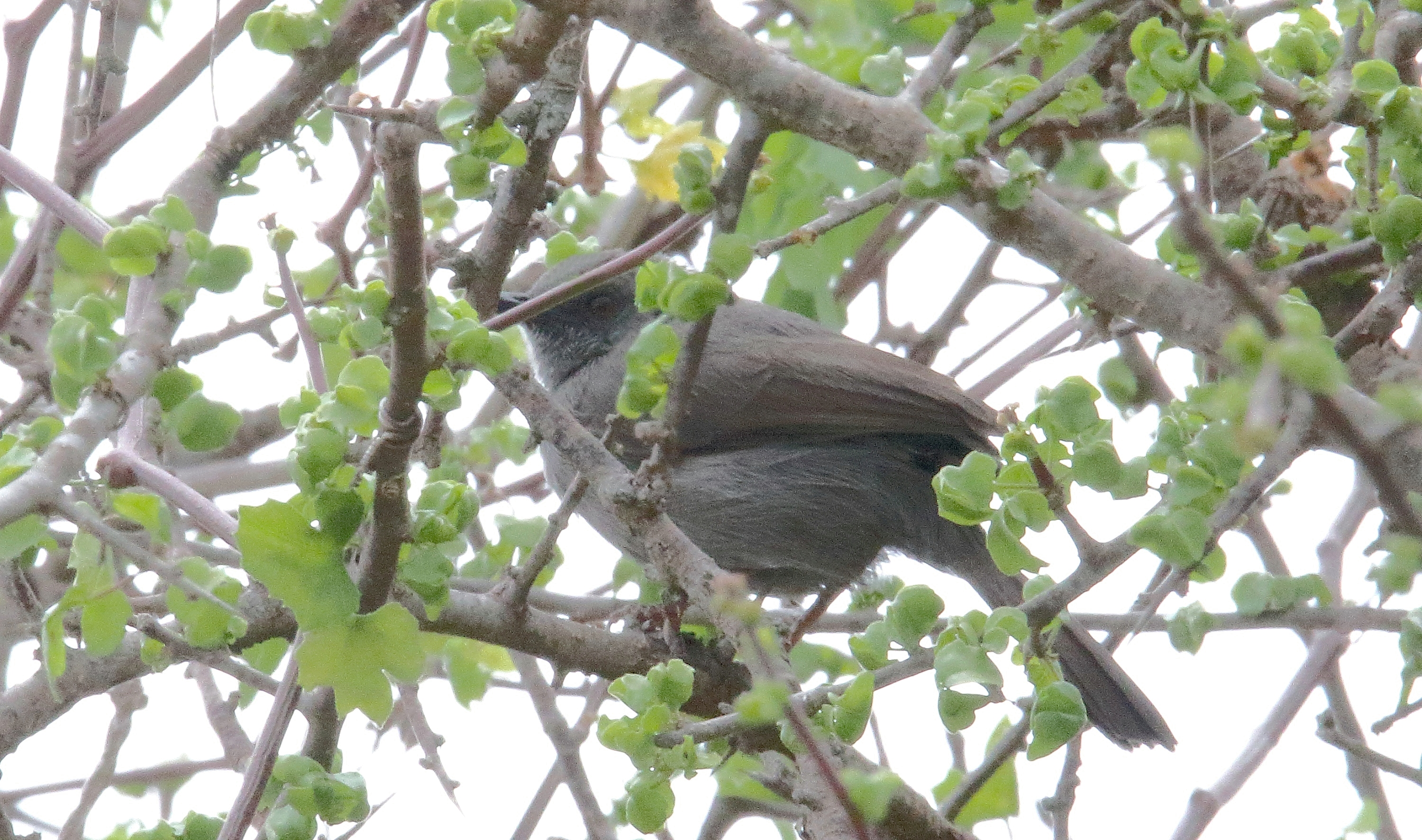
- Calamonastes simplex

Scientific classification
- Kingdom: Animalia
- Phylum: Chordata
- Class: Aves
- Order: Passeriformes
- Family: Cisticolidae
- Genus: Calamonastes; Sharpe, 1883

Type species
- Drymoica fasciolata A. Smith, 1847

= Calamonastes =

Genus of birds

Calamonastes is a genus of birds in the family Cisticolidae. It contains African wren-warblers.

== Species ==
Image	Common name	Scientific name	Distribution
	Barred wren-warbler	Calamonastes fasciolatus	Namibia, Botswana, western Angola, northern South Africa and southwestern Zimbabwe.
	Grey wren-warbler	Calamonastes simplex	Angola, Burundi, Democratic Republic of the Congo, Ethiopia, Kenya, Malawi, Rwanda, Somalia, South Sudan, Tanzania, Uganda, and Zambia.
	Stierling's wren-warbler	Calamonastes stierlingi	southern Africa.
	Miombo wren-warbler	Calamonastes undosus	southern Africa.

'
