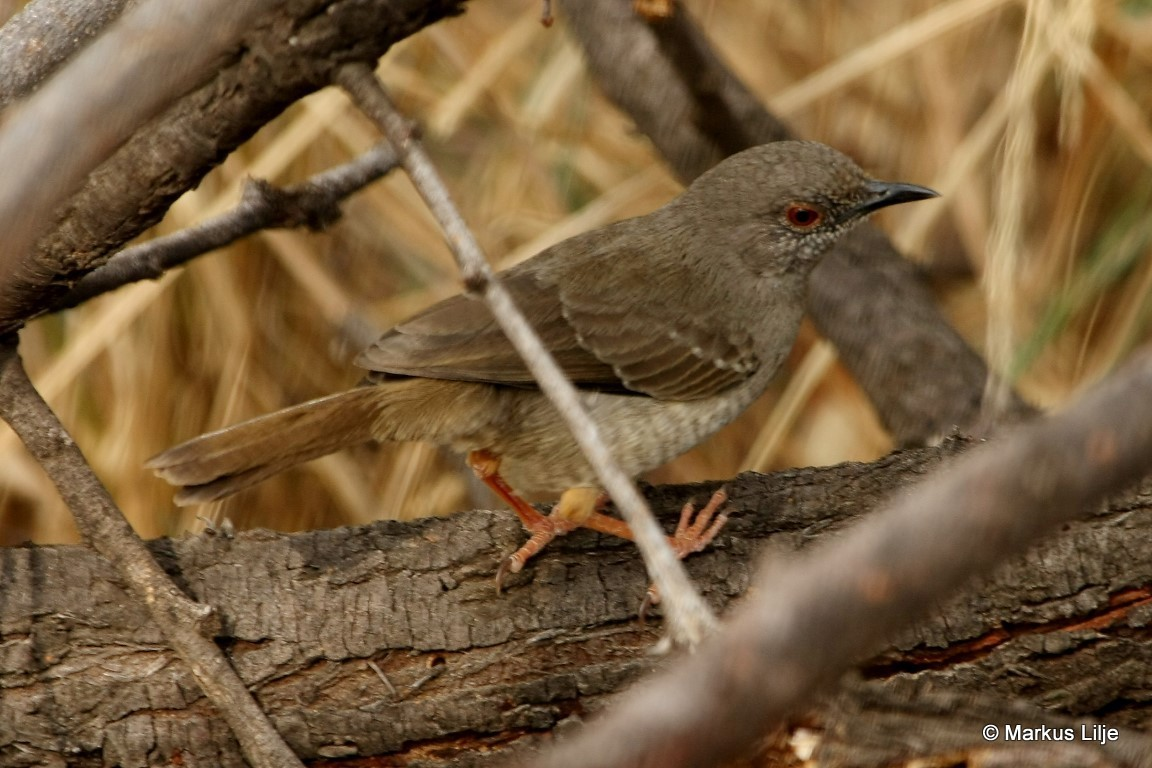

Conservation status
- Least Concern (IUCN 3.1)

Scientific classification
- Kingdom: Animalia
- Phylum: Chordata
- Class: Aves
- Order: Passeriformes
- Family: Cisticolidae
- Genus: Calamonastes
- Species: C. undosus

Binomial name
- Calamonastes undosus (Reichenow, 1882)

Synonyms
- Camaroptera undosa

= Miombo wren-warbler =

Species of bird

The miombo wren-warbler (Calamonastes undosus), also known as the miombo barred warbler or pale wren-warbler, is a species of bird in the family Cisticolidae found in southern Africa.

Some authorities have also included Stierling's wren-warbler in this species.

== Diet ==
It is an insectivore.
