= African yellow white-eye =

African yellow white-eye has been split into four species:

- Forest white-eye, Zosterops stenocricotus
- Green white-eye, Zosterops stuhlmanni
- Northern yellow white-eye, Zosterops senegalensis
- Southern yellow white-eye, Zosterops anderssoni
