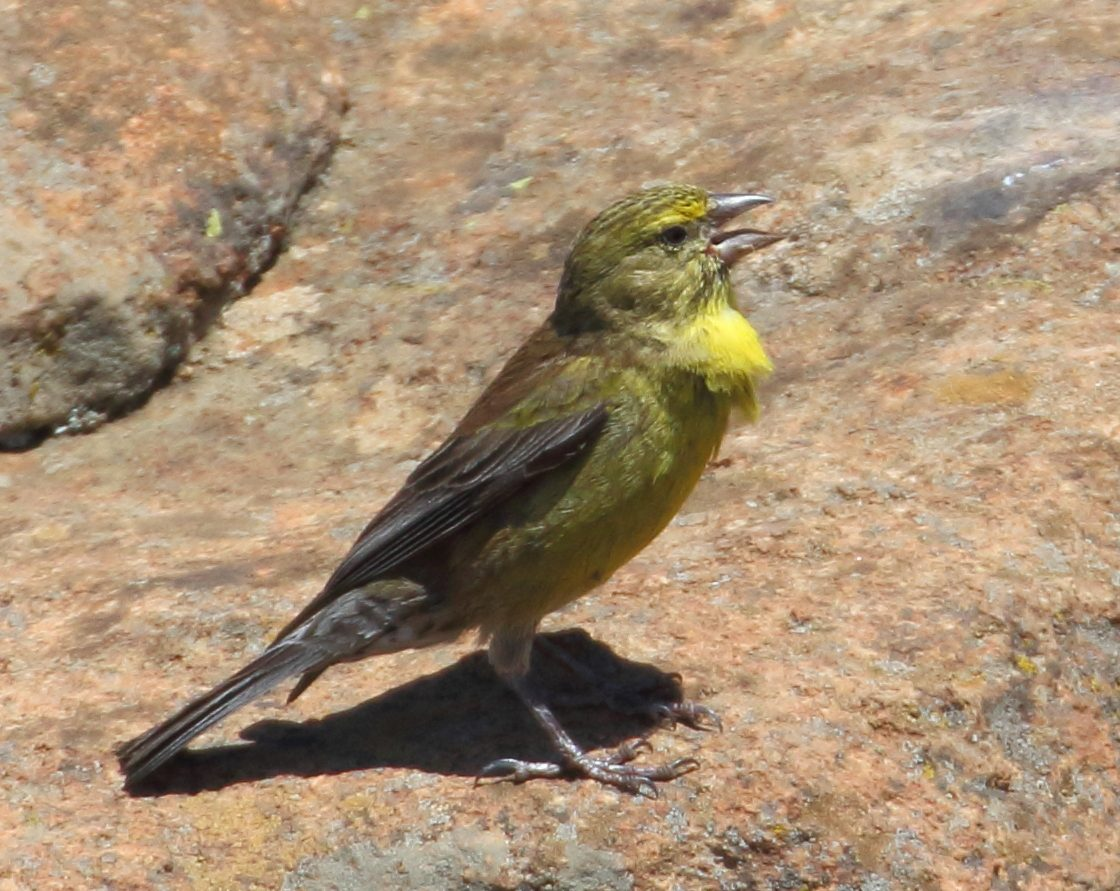
- A male
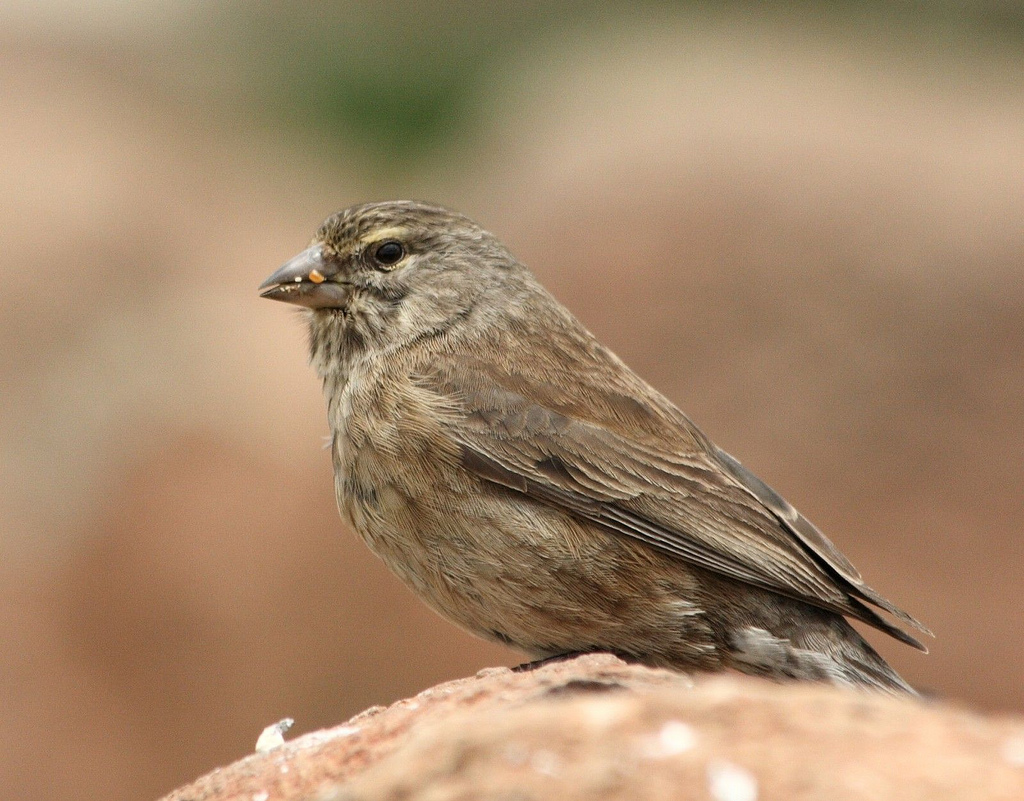
- A female at Sani Pass

Conservation status
- Least Concern (IUCN 3.1)

Scientific classification
- Kingdom: Animalia
- Phylum: Chordata
- Class: Aves
- Order: Passeriformes
- Family: Fringillidae
- Subfamily: Carduelinae
- Genus: Crithagra
- Species: C. symonsi

Binomial name
- Crithagra symonsi (Roberts, 1916)
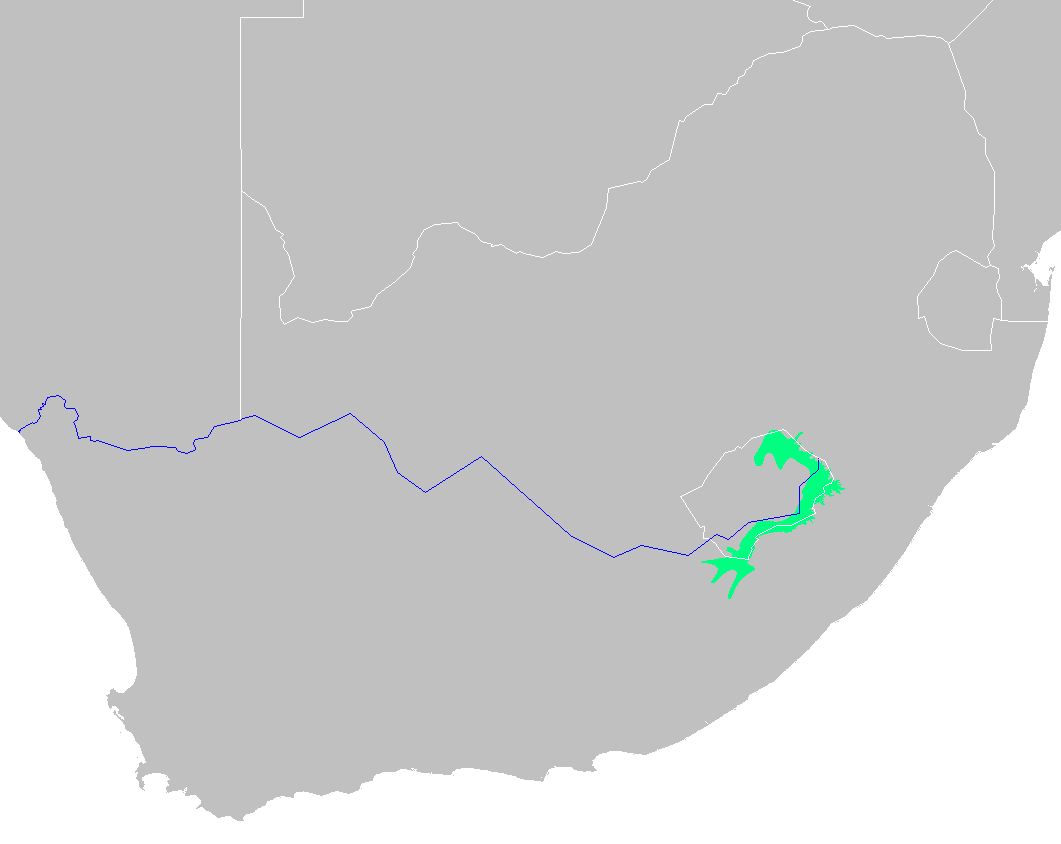
- General range: the Drakensberg alti-montane grasslands

Synonyms
- Serinus symonsi Pseudochloroptila symonsi

= Drakensberg siskin =

Species of bird

The Drakensberg siskin (Crithagra symonsi) is a small passerine bird in the finch family. It is an endemic resident breeder in the eastern Cape Province Transkei and western Natal in South Africa, and in Lesotho.

This species is sometimes considered to be conspecific with the Cape siskin (Crithagra totta) of southern Cape Province, in which case the nominate western form is C. t. totta, and the eastern form is C. t. symonsi.

This locally common but shy and unobtrusive siskin is found in the scrubby valleys and hillsides of the Drakensberg mountains.

== Taxonomy ==
The Drakensberg siskin was formerly placed in the genus Serinus but phylogenetic analysis using mitochondrial and nuclear DNA sequences found that the genus was polyphyletic. The genus was therefore split and a number of species including the Drakensberg siskin were moved to the resurrected genus Crithagra.

== Description ==
The Drakensberg siskin averages 13–14 cm in length. The tail has white sides, a feature which is diagnostic for both sexes, and especially visible in flight. The adult male has a faintly streaked light brown back, light brown wing coverts, rump and upper tail, and yellow underparts. The head and nape sides are yellowish grey and olive. The throat is bright yellow, but the rest of the underparts are a somewhat duller shade.

The female has similar but duller upperparts and has no yellow in the plumage. The head and underparts are buff with much fine dark brown streaks on the head and breast. The juvenile plumage is much like the female's but with heavier streaking.

There is no range overlap with the slightly smaller Cape siskin, which has white spots on the flight feathers and tail and more uniform upperparts.

The Drakensberg siskin's call is a schwee, often given in flight. and the song, like that of Cape siskin, is a weak, pleasant warble similar to the yellow-fronted canary.

== Behaviour ==
=== Breeding ===
One reason for the taxonomic uncertainty with this species is that, if it is a true siskin, it is the only one which breeds in cavities. A shallow cup nest is constructed in cracks or holes in rocks, on ledges or amongst vegetation, especially ferns. Natural hollows in trees are rarely used.

The nest is constructed by the female with fine plant material, lined with plant down and animal hair. The clutch is three or four, occasionally five, eggs, incubated by the female. She is fed by the male on the nest by regurgitation.

=== Feeding ===
The Drakensberg siskin is seen in pairs or small flock, moving unobtrusively through bushes and scrub as it forages for seeds (including proteas), buds and insects.
