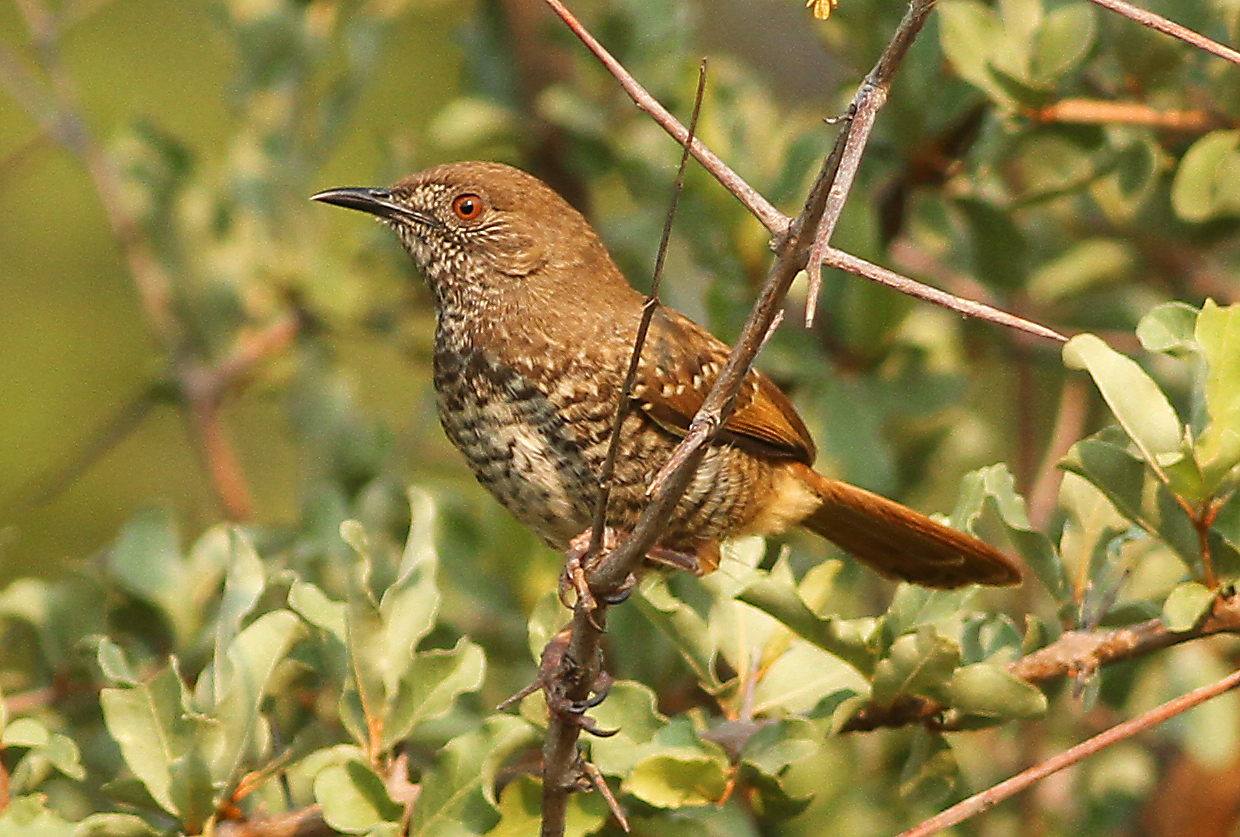

Conservation status
- Least Concern (IUCN 3.1)

Scientific classification
- Kingdom: Animalia
- Phylum: Chordata
- Class: Aves
- Order: Passeriformes
- Family: Cisticolidae
- Genus: Calamonastes
- Species: C. fasciolatus

Binomial name
- Calamonastes fasciolatus (Smith, 1847)
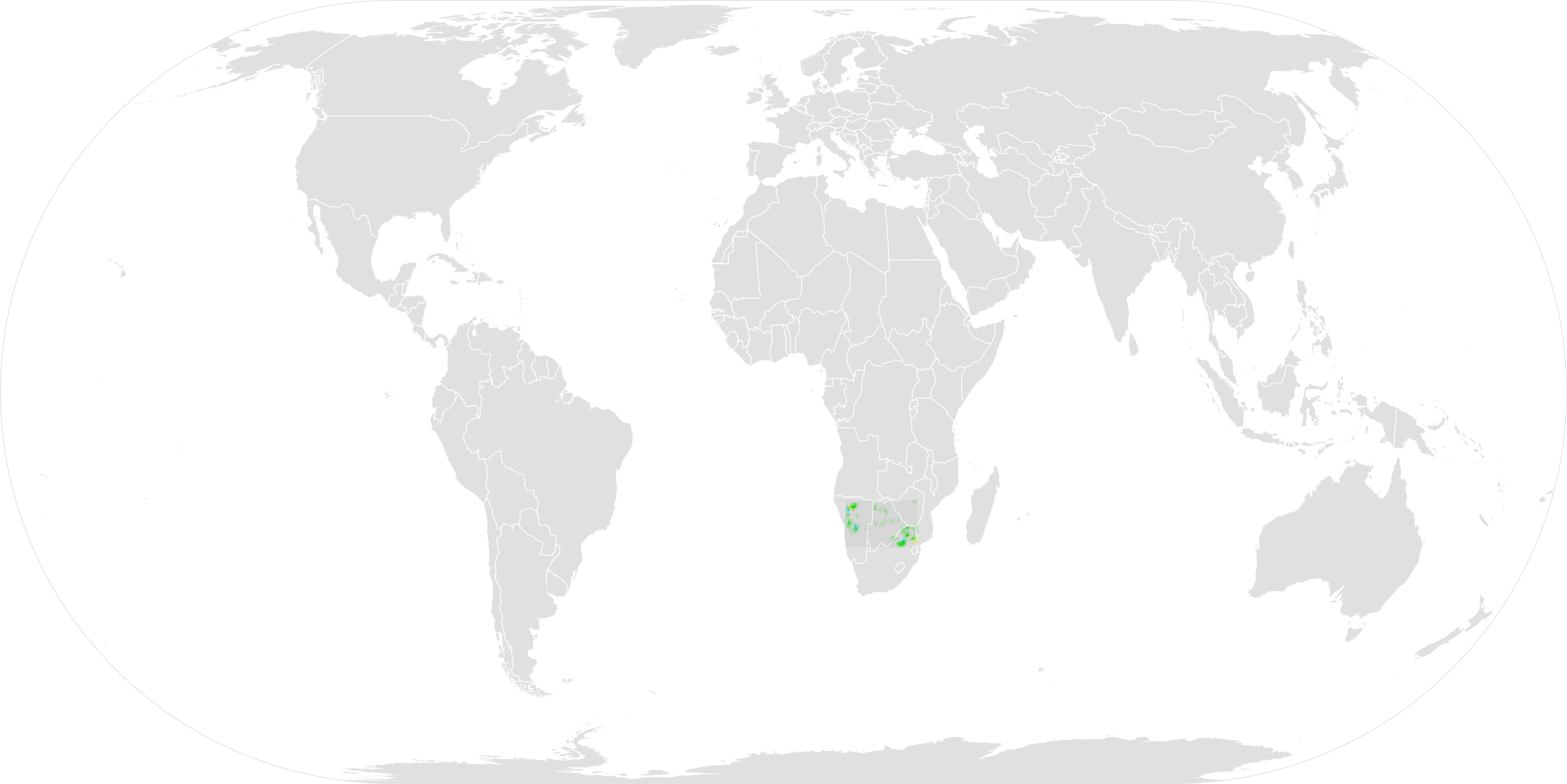
- Global range Year-Round Range Summer Range Winter Range

Synonyms
- Camaroptera fasciolata

= Barred wren-warbler =

Species of bird

The barred wren-warbler or southern barred warbler (Calamonastes fasciolatus) is a species of bird in the family Cisticolidae.

It is found in Namibia, Botswana, western Angola, northern South Africa and southwestern Zimbabwe. Its natural habitat is dry savanna.
