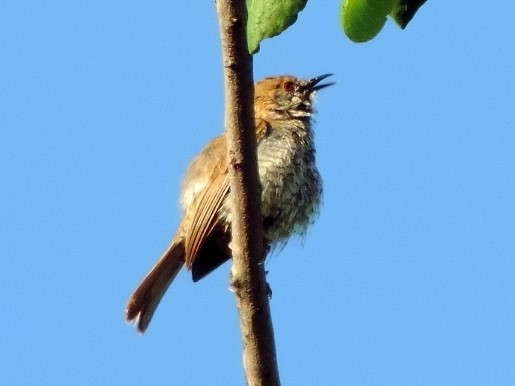

Conservation status
- Least Concern (IUCN 3.1)

Scientific classification
- Kingdom: Animalia
- Phylum: Chordata
- Class: Aves
- Order: Passeriformes
- Family: Cisticolidae
- Genus: Calamonastes
- Species: C. stierlingi

Binomial name
- Calamonastes stierlingi Reichenow, 1901

Synonyms
- Camaroptera stierlingi

= Stierling's wren-warbler =

Species of bird

Stierling's wren-warbler (Calamonastes stierlingi), is a species of bird in the family Cisticolidae found in southern Africa. It is sometimes considered a subspecies of the miombo wren-warbler.
