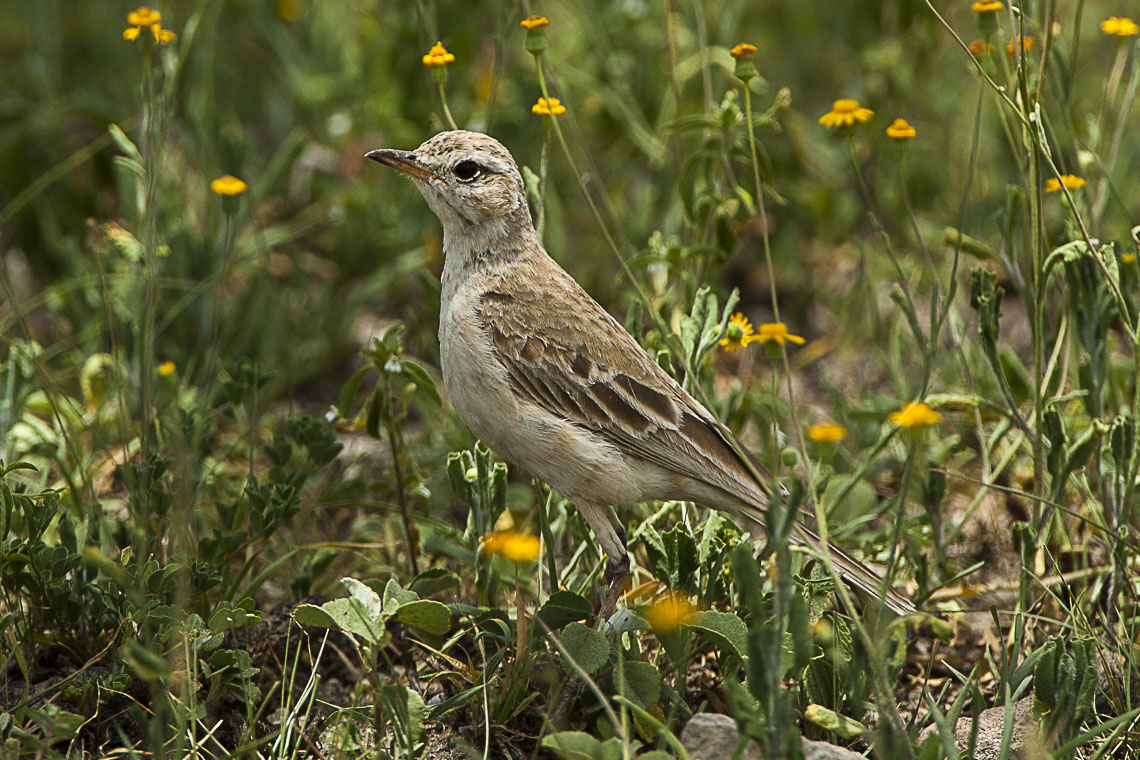

Conservation status
- Least Concern (IUCN 3.1)

Scientific classification
- Kingdom: Animalia
- Phylum: Chordata
- Class: Aves
- Order: Passeriformes
- Family: Motacillidae
- Genus: Anthus
- Species: A. leucophrys

Binomial name
- Anthus leucophrys Vieillot, 1818

= Plain-backed pipit =

Species of bird

The plain-backed pipit or plain pipit (Anthus leucophrys) is a medium-sized passerine bird which is a resident breeder in Africa south of the Sahara Desert.

It is found in open habitats, especially short grassland and cultivation. It builds its cup-shaped nest on the ground and usually lays three eggs. Like other pipits, this species is insectivorous.

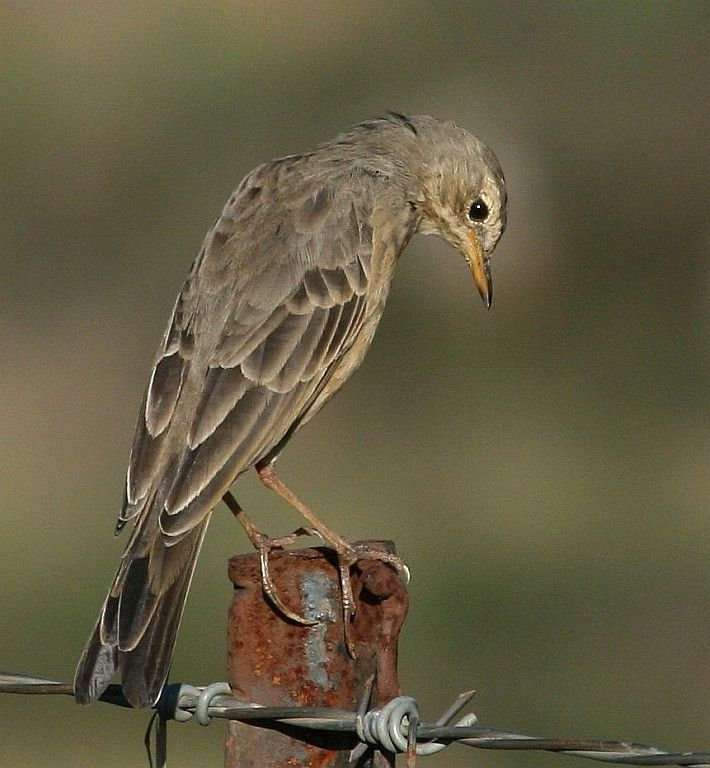

The plain-backed pipit is a large pipit at 17 cm, but is otherwise an undistinguished looking species, faintly streaked grey-brown above and pale below with light breast streaking. It has a strong white supercilium, and dark moustachial stripes. It has long legs and tail, and a long dark bill. Sexes are similar, but juveniles have warmer brown upperparts.

Some care must be taken to distinguish this species from wintering tawny pipits, Anthus campestris. The plain-backed pipit is sturdier and darker than the Tawny, and stands more upright. Perhaps the best distinction is the characteristic "ssissik" call, quite different from the tawny pipit's "tchilip".
