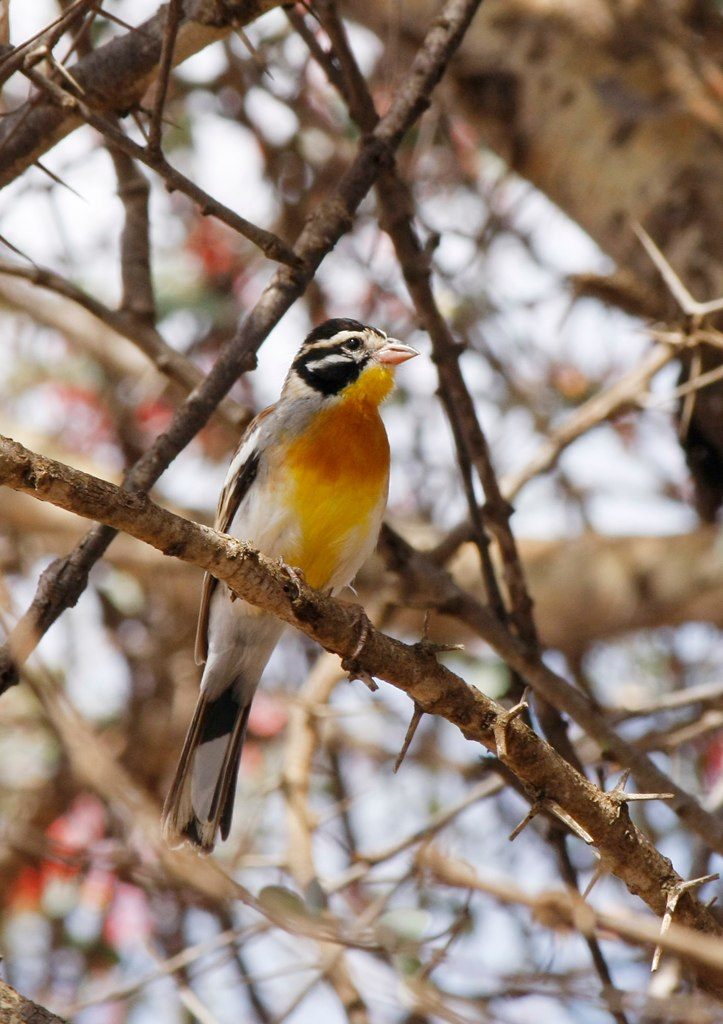

Conservation status
- Least Concern (IUCN 3.1)\

Scientific classification
- Kingdom: Animalia
- Phylum: Chordata
- Class: Aves
- Order: Passeriformes
- Family: Emberizidae
- Genus: Fringillaria
- Species: F. poliopleura

Binomial name
- Fringillaria poliopleura Salvadori, 1888

= Somali bunting =

Species of bird

The Somali bunting or Somali golden-breasted bunting (Fringillaria poliopleura) is a species of bird in the Old World bunting family, Emberizidae, found in dry, semi-open subtropical & tropical shrubland habitats of Ethiopia, Kenya, Somalia, South Sudan, Tanzania, and Uganda.

== Taxonomy ==
It was initially described in 1888 by Italian zoologist Tommaso Salvadori, based on a holotype specimen of an adult male collected in August of 1886 by Vincenzo Ragazzi.

This species was formerly placed in the genus Emberiza. In 2026, along with the closely related Cabanis's bunting (Fringillaria cabanisi) and golden-breasted bunting (F. flaviventris), it was moved to the resurrected genus Fringillaria based on the results of a 2021 molecular genetic study. Molecular-phylogenetic analyses suggest the Somali bunting's closest relative is the golden-breasted bunting, with these two species being sister to the Cabanis's bunting, and those three together being sister to the remaining members of genus Fringillaria.

== Description ==
Female in Tanzania

The Somali bunting is a medium-large bunting, reaching about 14–15 cm (5.5–5.9 in) in length and 14–18 g (0.49–0.63 oz) in weight. It is an attractive passerine, with distinctive features. Adult males sport a striking black-and-white facial pattern, with the black stripes having a strong brown wash in females and juveniles. The lower part of the beak is pink, and the upper part dusky with a pink cutting edge. The back of their neck is grey, fading into chestnut mantle feathers with pale grey margins & russet streaking, and a grey lower back and rump. The central breast is washed orange, and the throat, breast, and central belly are a bright yellow with pale flanks. Two white bars are visible on the wing when folded. The legs are a pale grey-brown. Adult female and juvenile plumage is similar, but overall duller than that of males.

As compared to the closely related golden-breasted bunting, the Somali bunting exhibits a generally paler coloration, a whiter face with narrower black facial stripes, a more subdued gray back and rump, stronger streaking on the mantle, and pronounced pale sides. Somali buntings also prefer drier habitat, and have minimal range overlap with the golden-breasted bunting.

Reportedly, it is a relatively quiet bird apart from occasional singing from a high perch. Males sing a repeated series of 4 to 6 short, whistled phrases of two notes each, which are repeated at the same pitch. They also give a long, ascending whistle. Some recorded songs include a ringing wee-chiwee-chiwee, a slower tswit, tsuwee tsuwee tsuwee, a soft siwoo, siwoo, siwoo, siwoo, tsi, and a series of up to six hard s'chaa notes. They have also been recorded singing a tizekk song up to 5 times from a perch, and giving a similar note in flight or while carrying food to a nest. It sings with its head thrown back and its beak wide open.

== Distribution and habitat ==
Found from eastern and southern Ethiopia, far southeastern South Sudan and Somalia through northeastern Uganda, Kenya & northeastern Tanzania, the Somali bunting is a bird of semi-arid and arid shrublands and dry savanna, particularly acacia (Acacia) and Commiphora scrub. In north Kenya and Somalia, it is found at elevations up to 1,500 m (4,900 ft), and can be found at elevations of 2,000 m (6,600 ft) in the Ethiopian Rift Valley. In central and southern Kenya, however, it tends to stay at lower elevations, up to 1,200 m (3,900 ft).

It is locally common in thick, dry thorn scrub and acacia scrub throughout its range, and can often be found in dry scrub at the foot or on the slopes of isolated kopjes. They can also be seen in woody or wooded brush, or grasslands with sufficient brush. It reportedly avoids riparian habitat and areas where flat top acacia (Vachellia abyssinica) is the dominant species.

Somali buntings have been considered mostly sedentary birds, although they may undertake local migratory movements. They are sometimes attracted to lights at night in Kenya, possibly during migration, and extralimital records in north-central Tanzania and southern Kenya suggests they may migrate to some extent.

== Behavior and ecology ==
Male Somali bunting on the ground

The Somali bunting is a primarily ground-feeding bird, tending to stay low in the bushes. Their diet is primarily grass seeds, with some soft green leaves and insects such as termites (Isoptera), beetle larvae (Coleoptera), and moths (Lepidoptera). They are often seen in pairs or small groups.

Little is known about the breeding biology of the Somali bunting. The breeding season varies over their range, being primarily April through June, or occasionally through to September, in Ethiopia, Somalia, and northern Kenya, and November through January in coastal, inland southern Kenya and Tanzania. Somali buntings are solitary nesters. Their rough, cup-shaped nests are unlined, constructed of grass stems and about 10 cm (3.9 in) in diameter. Nests are built in the forks of bushes, a few feet off the ground. Eggs are white, with rings of sepia or gray-brown to blackish dots and smudging. About 2 to 6 eggs are laid on average. In captivity, eggs are incubated for 12 days, and nestlings fledge after 16 to 18 days.
