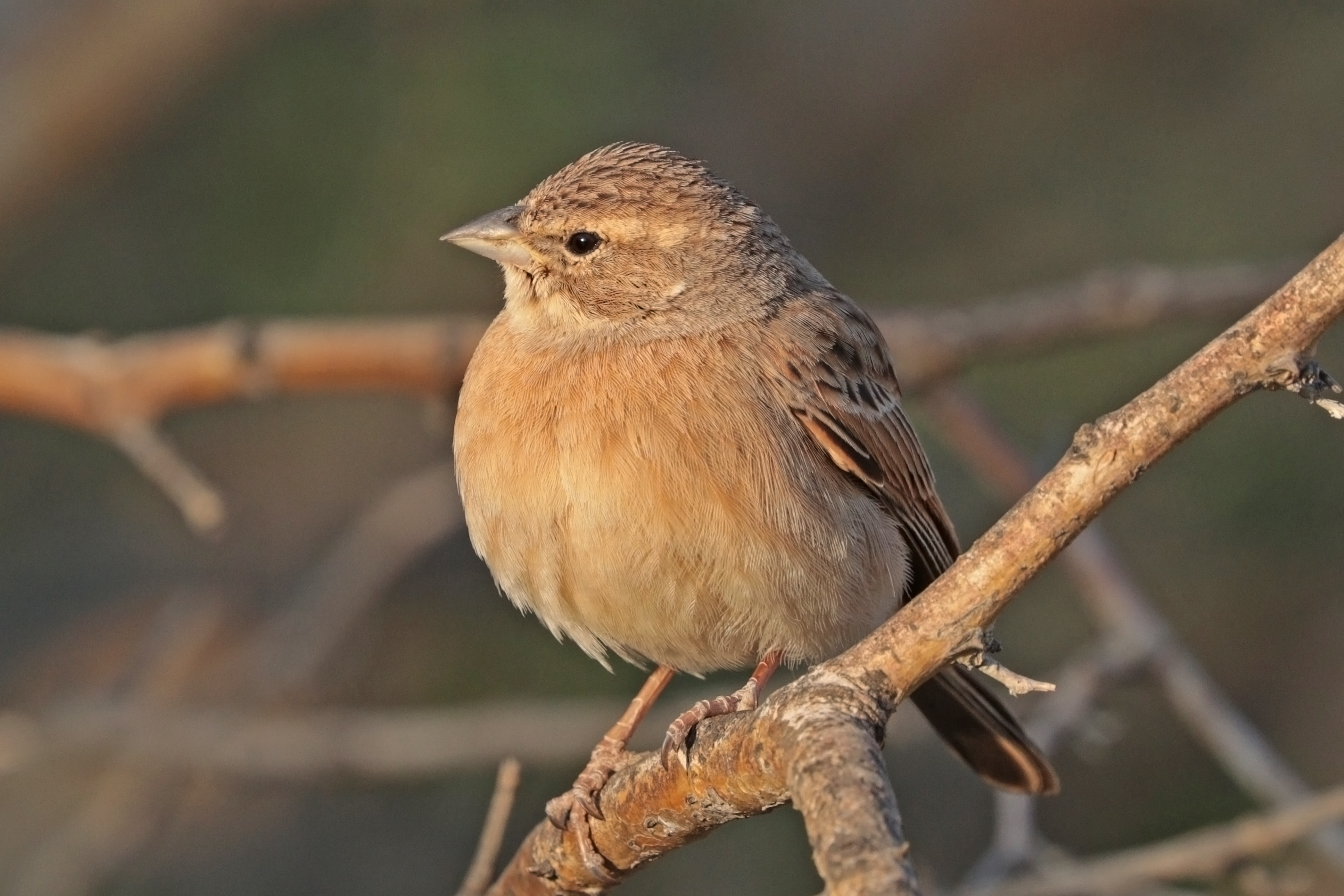
- Near Omaruru, Namibia

Conservation status
- Least Concern (IUCN 3.1)

Scientific classification
- Kingdom: Animalia
- Phylum: Chordata
- Class: Aves
- Order: Passeriformes
- Family: Emberizidae
- Genus: Fringillaria
- Species: F. impetuani

Binomial name
- Fringillaria impetuani (Smith, 1836)

= Lark-like bunting =

Species of bird

The lark-like bunting (Fringillaria impetuani) is a species of bird in the family Emberizidae, which is native to south-western Africa.

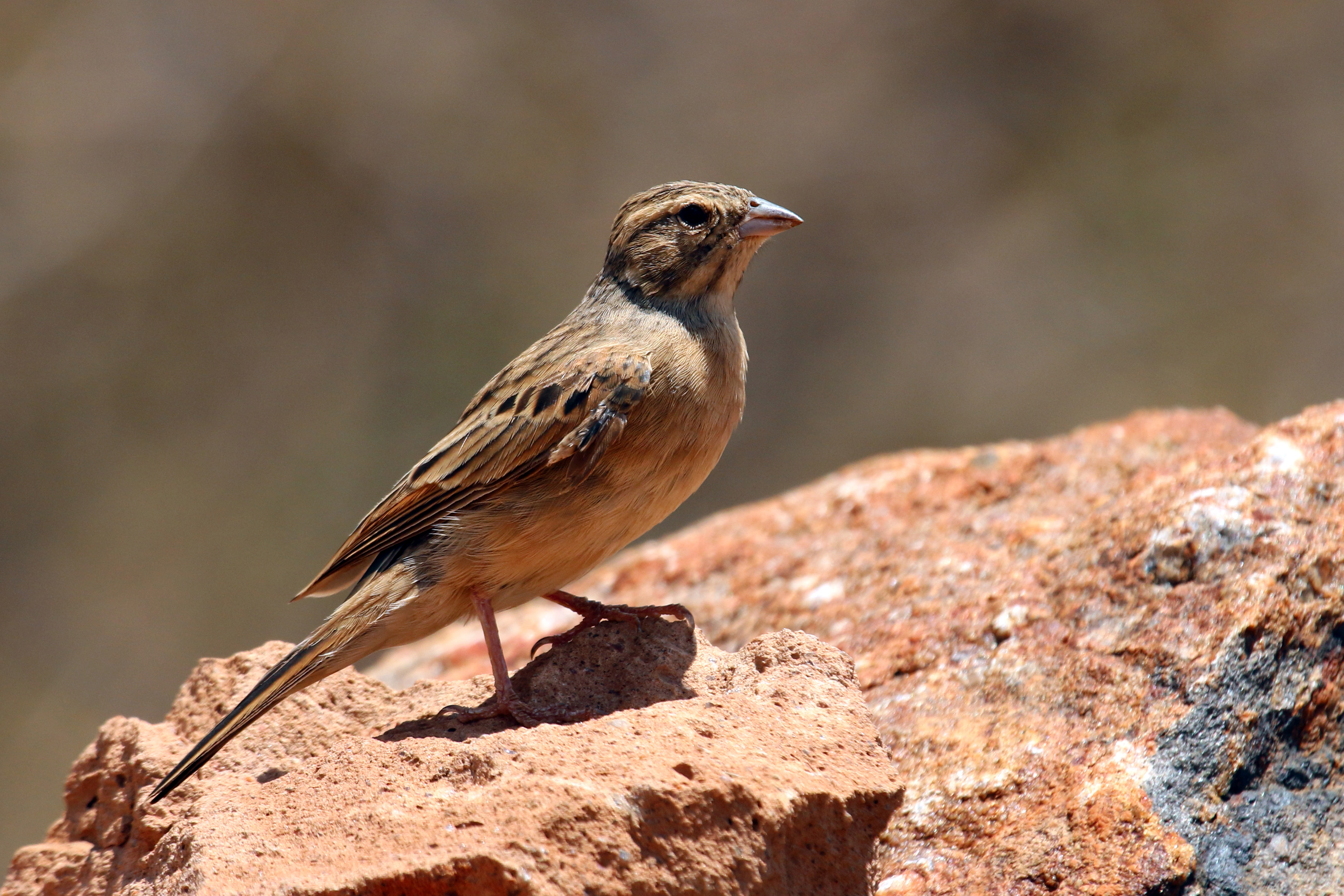
In Tswalu Kalahari Reserve, South Africa

It is found in Angola, Botswana, Lesotho, Namibia, South Africa, and Zimbabwe.

Its natural habitat is subtropical or tropical dry shrubland.

== Taxonomy ==
This species was formerly placed in the genus Emberiza. In 2026 it was moved to the resurrected genus Fringillaria based on the results of a 2021 molecular genetic study.

Two subspecies are recognised:

- F. i. impetuani (Smith, 1836) – northern South Africa to western Botswana and southwestern Zimbabwe
- F. i. sloggetti (Macdonald, 1957) – western South Africa
