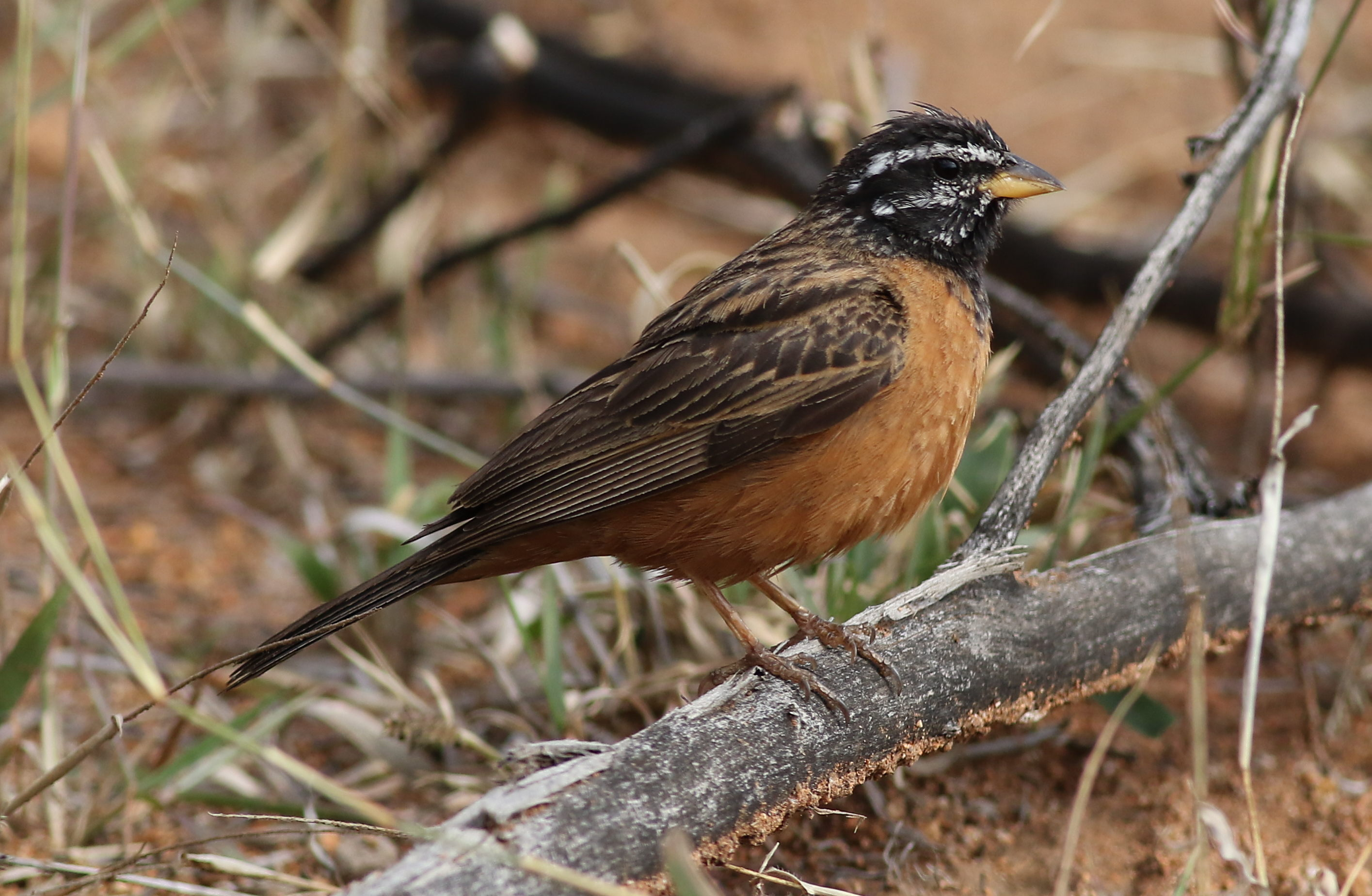
- At Pilanesberg National Park

Conservation status
- Least Concern (IUCN 3.1)

Scientific classification
- Kingdom: Animalia
- Phylum: Chordata
- Class: Aves
- Order: Passeriformes
- Family: Emberizidae
- Genus: Fringillaria
- Species: F. tahapisi

Binomial name
- Fringillaria tahapisi (Smith, 1836)
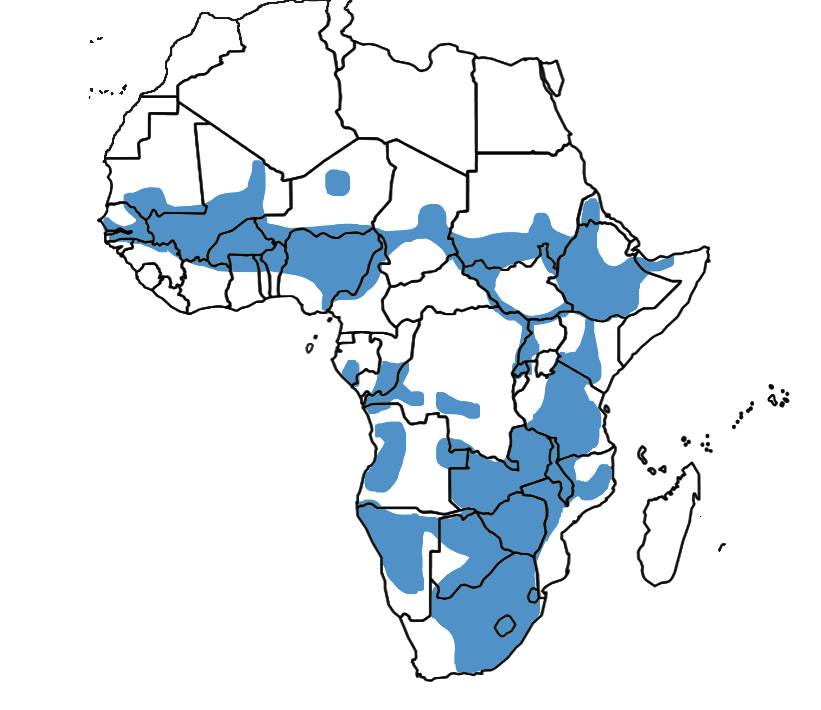
- native range

Synonyms
- Emberiza tahapisi

= Cinnamon-breasted bunting =

Species of bird

The cinnamon-breasted bunting (Fringillaria tahapisi) or cinnamon-breasted rock-bunting is a species of bird in the bunting family Emberizidae. It is widespread in Africa south of the Sahara.

== Taxonomy and systematics ==
The cinnamon-breasted bunting was formally described in 1836 by the Scottish zoologist Andrew Smith under the binomial name Emberiza tahapisi. His description was based on specimens found near the source of the Vaal River in South Africa. The specific epithet tahapisi is from the Tswana word "Thagapitse" that is used for various finches in the family Emberizidae. The species is also known as the cinnamon-breasted rock bunting or African rock bunting.

This species was formerly placed in the genus Emberiza. In 2026 it was moved to the resurrected genus Fringillaria based on the results of a 2021 molecular genetic study.

Four subspecies are recognised:

- F. t. arabica Lorenz von Liburnau & Hellmayr, 1902 – southern Arabia (Asir to Hadhramaut)
- F. t. septemstriata (Rüppell, 1837) – southeastern Sudan, northeastern South Sudan, Eritrea, and northwestern Ethiopia; possibly a hybrid between nominate tahapisi and Gosling's bunting (Fringillaria goslingi)
- F. t. tahapisi (Smith, 1836) – central, southern Ethiopia to southeastern South Africa, also southern Gabon, Angola, southern Democratic Republic of the Congo and Socotra Island
- F. t. nivenorum (Winterbottom, 1965) – western Namibia and (presumably) adjacent southwestern Angola

== Description ==
The cinnamon-breasted bunting weighs between 11.6 and 21 grams (0.41 and 0.74 oz) with a length of 13–15 centimetres (5.1–5.9 in). Although plumage differs between juveniles, males, and females, cinnamon-breasted buntings can be identified by their striped head and cinnamon brown underparts. Males have black and white stripes whereas the female stripes are less dark and browner in color. The throat patch is uniformly black on males but smaller, grayish, and densely blotched on females. Juveniles are similar to females but with buffier head stripes and a paler, browner throat. After the breeding season, juveniles moult partially and adults moult completely so all primaries and secondaries are the same age.

Cinnamon-breasted bunting songs are composed of short, high-pitched, rapid trills. Males are known to have eight distinct songs with 40 discrete syllables. Song similarity decreases with distance between local populations but all end with a characteristic final whistle syllable. Individuals perform songs from elevated positions such as from trees, bushes, or rocks.

== Distribution and habitat ==
Having a very widespread distribution, cinnamon-breasted buntings are found across most of mainland sub-Saharan Africa but avoiding deserts, equatorial forest, and the high altitudes of mountains. They can be found in rocky, lightly wooded hillsides with sparse vegetation and bare soil but can sometimes be found in woodlands. There is some degree of partial migration with certain populations moving north during the rainy season and south during the dry season as well as moving to lower elevations during winter.

== Behavior and ecology ==
Breeding time varies depending on the rainy season of the region. In arid regions with light rainfall, the breeding season will occur throughout the rainy season but in regions with heavier rainfall, the breeding season occurs at the end of the rainy season. They are monogamous but solitary nesters. The nest is built from twigs and grass and typically placed on the ground in a shaded area. Incubation and care for young is performed by both males and females. Incubation lasts 12–14 days and offspring fledge 14–16 days post-hatch but continue to feed in parental territory for three weeks. The clutch size is 2–4 and the eggs are greenish- or bluish-white with dark brown or reddish-brown speckles.

Cinnamon-breasted buntings are ground gleaners that primarily eat seeds but have also been known to eat insects, especially in captivity. They will also sometimes jump to pull seeds. Chicks are fed seeds and insects by parents.

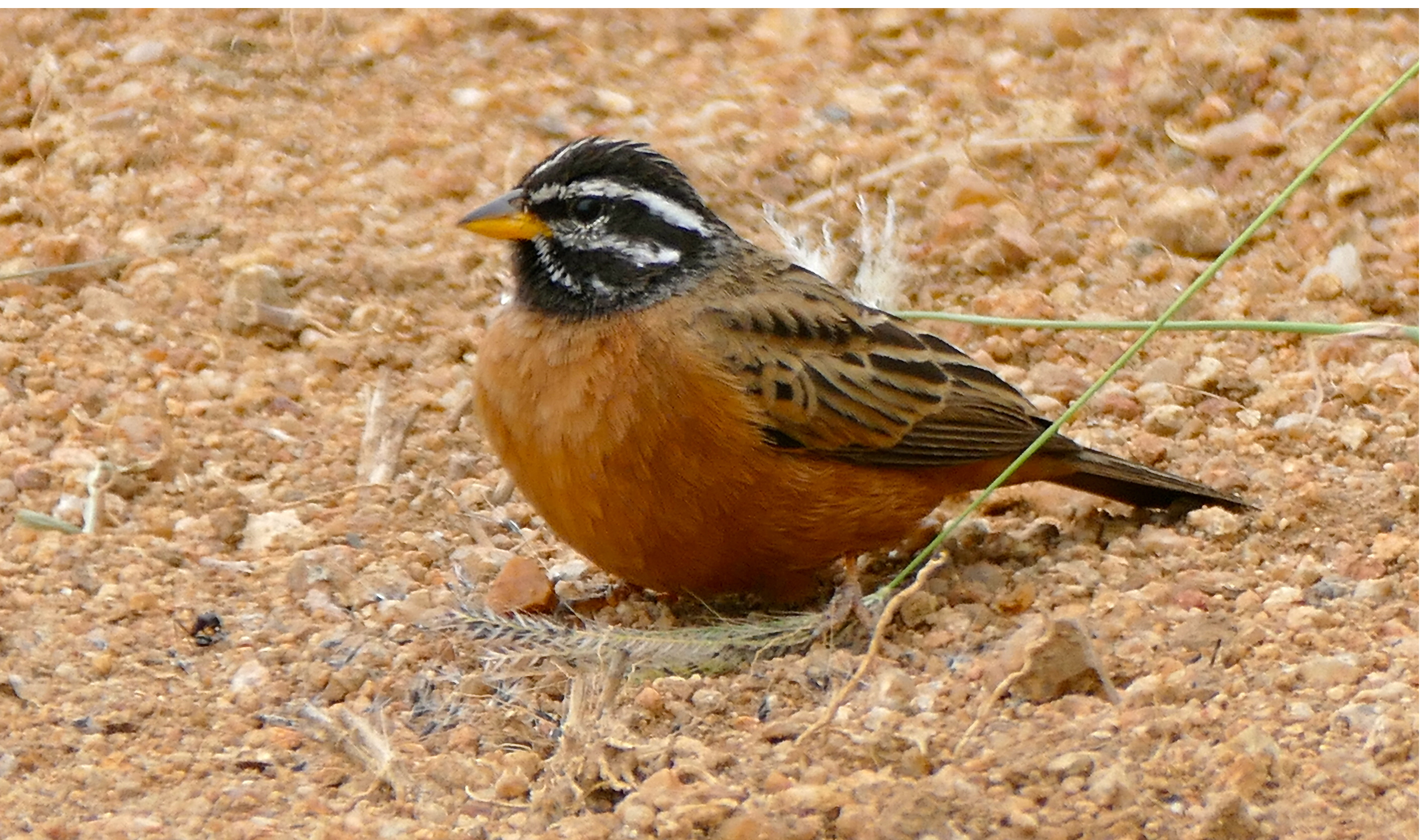
Feeding on grass seed in the Kruger N. P., South Africa

They are commonly spotted alone or in pairs but also flock in groups of 3–4, and even 6–8 but less frequently so. However, migrating birds can be found in flocks of 40. Tail flicks are a common behavior that defines Emberiza and is used while hopping on the ground to make them more conspicuous to mates and other birds. Courtship behavior includes males chasing the female through the air, males bringing nest materials to nest and making "nest shaping movements", and females quivering their wings while making a special repeating eep sound. Aggressive behavior includes a head forward position with bill snapping or gaping, with bill snapping occurring more frequently when fear is stronger than aggression. When fighting, special chaa, eee, and chu chatter sounds are made. Fear responses include freezing and observing when the perceived threat level is low, fleeing, and making alarm calls. Higher intensity behavior includes mobbing.

== Relationship to humans ==
Cinnamon-breasted buntings may occasionally enter towns and in some countries they are caught for cagebird trade but adapt well in captivity.

== Status ==
According to the IUCN, they are categorized as least concern. However, their range has expanded since 1985 due to climate change and habitat fragmentation.
