= Fringillaria =

- Cape bunting (Fringillaria capensis)

Scientific classification
- Kingdom: Animalia
- Phylum: Chordata
- Class: Aves
- Order: Passeriformes
- Family: Emberizidae
- Genus: Fringillaria; Swainson, 1837

Type species
- Emberiza capensis Linnaeus, 1766

Genus of birds

Fringillaria is a genus of Old World passerine birds in the family Emberizidae, mainly found in dry savanna regions of Africa, with two species extending into southwest Asia and one recently colonising the extreme south of Europe. The eleven species now placed in the genus were formerly placed in the genus Emberiza. They are seed-eating birds with stubby, conical bills that inhabit open and half-open habitats, including deserts, stony drylands, shrubland and savanna, and have largely brown body plumage with distinct head patterns in black, grey, or white; some also have yellow underparts.

== Taxonomy ==
The genus Fringillaria was introduced in 1837 by the English zoologist William Swainson. He listed several species in the new genus but did not specify a type species. The type was designated in 1840 by English zoologist George Gray as Emberiza capensis Linnaeus, 1766, the Cape bunting. The genus name is a variant of the genus Fringilla that was introduced by Carl Linnaeus in 1758. The word fringilla is Latin meaning "finch".

The genus was formerly treated as a synonym of the genus Emberiza that had been introduced by Linnaeus in 1858, but based on a molecular genetic study published in 2021, the genus was resurrected to contain eleven species.

The following cladogram shows the relationships between the species. It is based on the 2021 study by Tianlong Cai and collaborators. The phylogenetic position of the brown-rumped bunting (F. affinis) was not determined.

- Fringillaria
  - - Cabanis's bunting – Fringillaria cabanisi
    - - Golden-breasted bunting – Fringillaria flaviventris
      - Somali bunting – Fringillaria poliopleura
  - - Cape bunting – Fringillaria capensis
    - - Lark-like bunting – Fringillariaa impetuani
      - - Socotra bunting – Fringillaria socotrana
        - - - Gosling's bunting – Fringillaria goslingi
            - Cinnamon-breasted bunting – Fringillaria tahapisi
          - - House bunting – Fringillaria sahari
            - Striolated bunting – Fringillaria striolata

The genus contains the following eleven species:

Image	Common name	Scientific name	Distribution
	Cabanis's bunting	Fringillaria cabanisi	Guinea and far southern Mali eastward to far southern Sudan and northwestern Uganda; Angola, southern Zimbabwe, and central Mozambique
	Golden-breasted bunting	Fringillaria flaviventris	Sahel zone and disjunctly eastern and southern Africa southern Mauritania to northern Eritrea and far northern Ethiopia; southern Democratic Republic of the Congo and far southern South Sudan through eastern Africa, southward through South Africa (except southwestern)
	Somali bunting	Fringillaria poliopleura	southeastern South Sudan, Ethiopia, and Somalia southward to northeastern Tanzania
	Brown-rumped bunting	Fringillaria affinis	Sahel zone and northeastern Africa, from Senegal, far southern Mauritania to northern Guinea and eastward to western and southern Ethiopia, northern Uganda, and western Kenya
	Cape bunting	Fringillaria capensis	southern Africa southwestern Angola eastward to western Mozambique, southward through southern South Africa
	Lark-like bunting	Fringillaria impetuani	central Angola to Namibia, Botswana, Zimbabwe, and western and central South Africa
	Socotra bunting	Fringillaria socotrana	Socotra
	House bunting	Fringillaria sahari	Morocco eastward to northwestern Libya, and southward patchily to Mauritania, Mali, Niger, and Chad, recent colonist since 2023 in southern Spain; post-breeding dispersal northward and southward
	Striolated bunting	Fringillaria striolata	northeastern Africa to southwestern Asia patchily in northeastern Chad and eastern Egypt to northeastern Somalia and southward to northwestern Kenya; Sinai Peninsula, Israel, and western Jordan, Arabian Peninsula, southern Iran, northeastern Afghanistan to far western India; winters to west-central India
	Gosling's bunting	Fringillaria goslingi	Mauritania and Senegambia eastward to eastern Sudan and northeastern South Sudan, and southward to Cameroon and Central African Republic; partial migrant with rains, and nomadic wandering
	Cinnamon-breasted bunting	Fringillaria tahapisi	Gabon eastward to northeastern Somalia and Socotra, and southern Arabian Peninsula southward through South Africa
