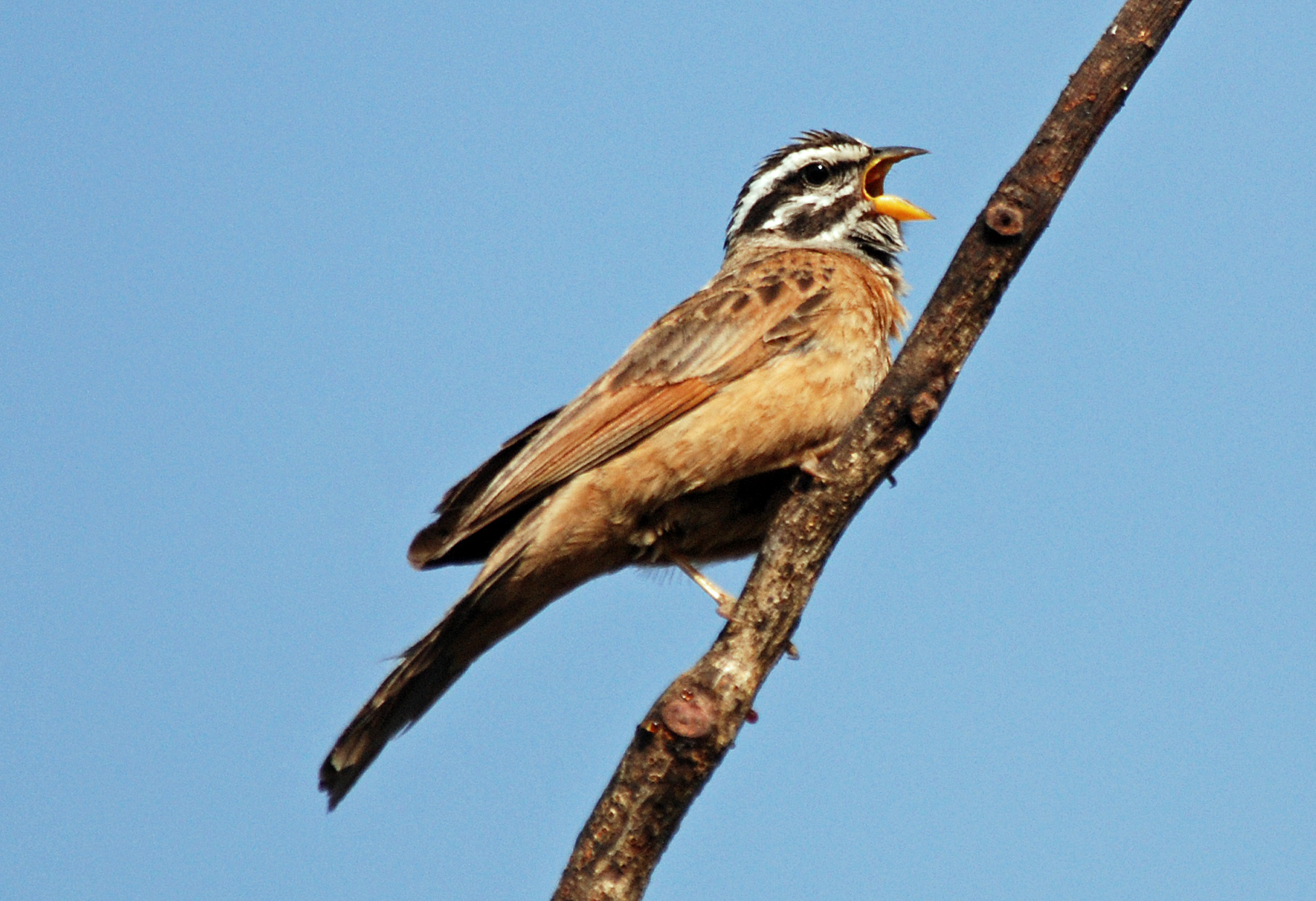

Conservation status
- Least Concern (IUCN 3.1)

Scientific classification
- Kingdom: Animalia
- Phylum: Chordata
- Class: Aves
- Order: Passeriformes
- Family: Emberizidae
- Genus: Fringillaria
- Species: F. goslingi

Binomial name
- Fringillaria goslingi Alexander, 1906

= Gosling's bunting =

Species of bird

Gosling's bunting (Fringillaria goslingi), also known as the grey-throated bunting, is a species of bird in the family Emberizidae. It is found in Africa from Mauritania and Senegal to south-western Sudan and north-eastern Democratic Republic of Congo. Its natural habitats are dry savannah, subtropical or tropical dry shrubland, and subtropical or tropical dry lowland grassland.

It was previously considered conspecific with the cinnamon-breasted bunting.

Gosling's bunting was formerly placed in the genus Emberiza. In 2026 it was moved to the resurrected genus Fringillaria based on the results of a 2021 molecular genetic study.
