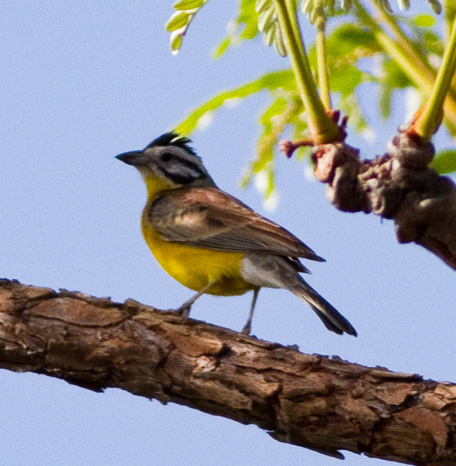

Conservation status
- Least Concern (IUCN 3.1)

Scientific classification
- Kingdom: Animalia
- Phylum: Chordata
- Class: Aves
- Order: Passeriformes
- Family: Emberizidae
- Genus: Fringillaria
- Species: F. affinis

Binomial name
- Fringillaria affinis (Heuglin, 1867)

= Brown-rumped bunting =

Species of bird

The brown-rumped bunting (Fringillaria affinis) is a species of bird in the family Emberizidae native to the Sudan (region) and adjacent areas. Its natural habitat is subtropical or tropical moist lowland forests.

== Taxonomy ==
This species was formerly placed in the genus Emberiza. In 2026 it was moved to the resurrected genus Fringillaria based on the results of a 2021 molecular genetic study.

Four subspecies are recognised:

- F. a. nigeriae (Bannerman & Bates, 1926) – Gambia to Nigeria and northern Cameroon
- F. a. vulpecula (Grote, 1921) – Cameroon, southern Chad, and adjacent northern Central African Republic
- F. a. affinis (Heuglin, 1867) – South Sudan, northeastern Democratic Republic of the Congo, northern Uganda and northwestern Kenya; population in southeastern Sudan and northwestern Ethiopia presumably also this subspecies
- F. a. omoensis (Neumann, 1905) – southern Ethiopia
