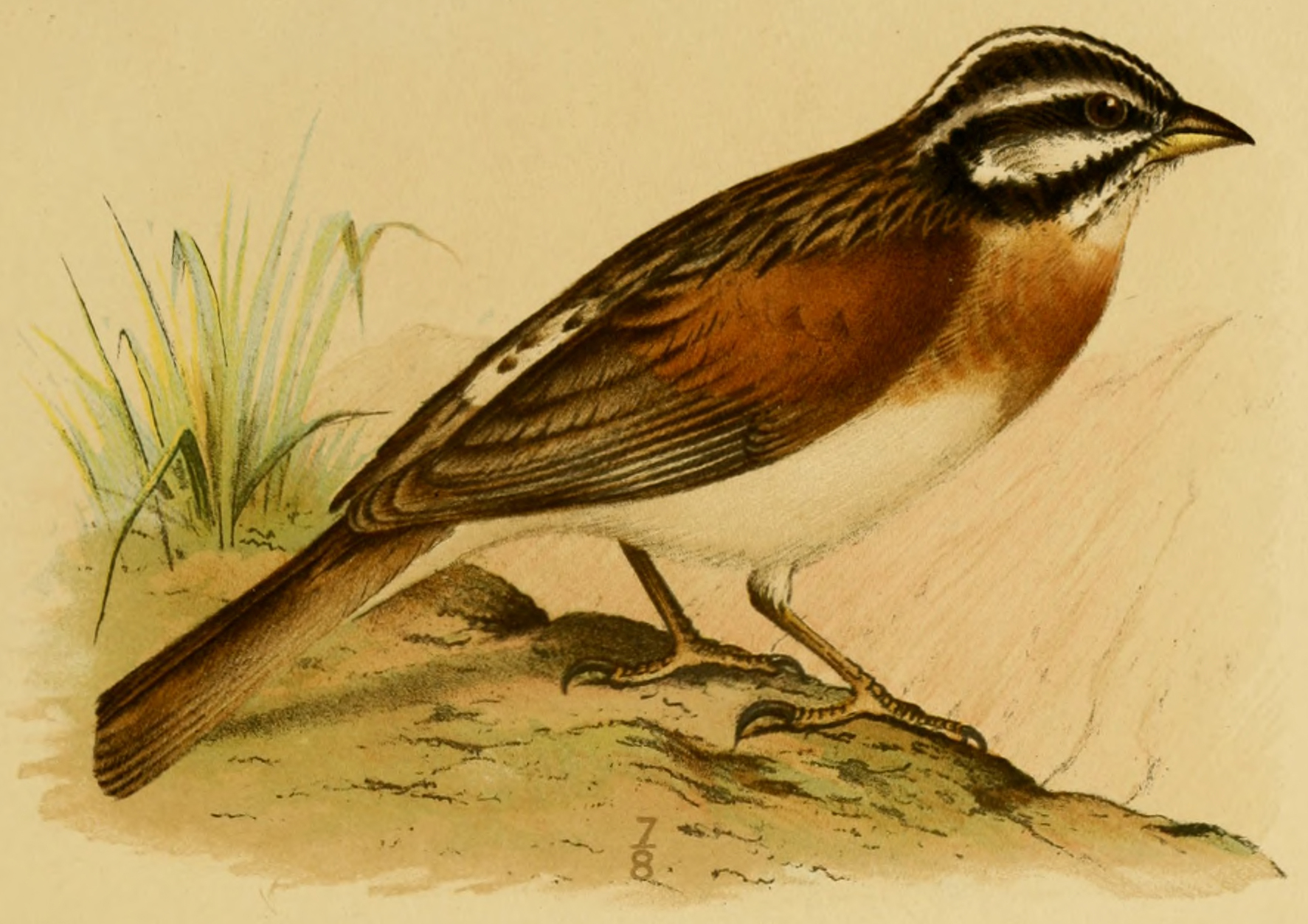
- Illustration by Henrik Grönvold
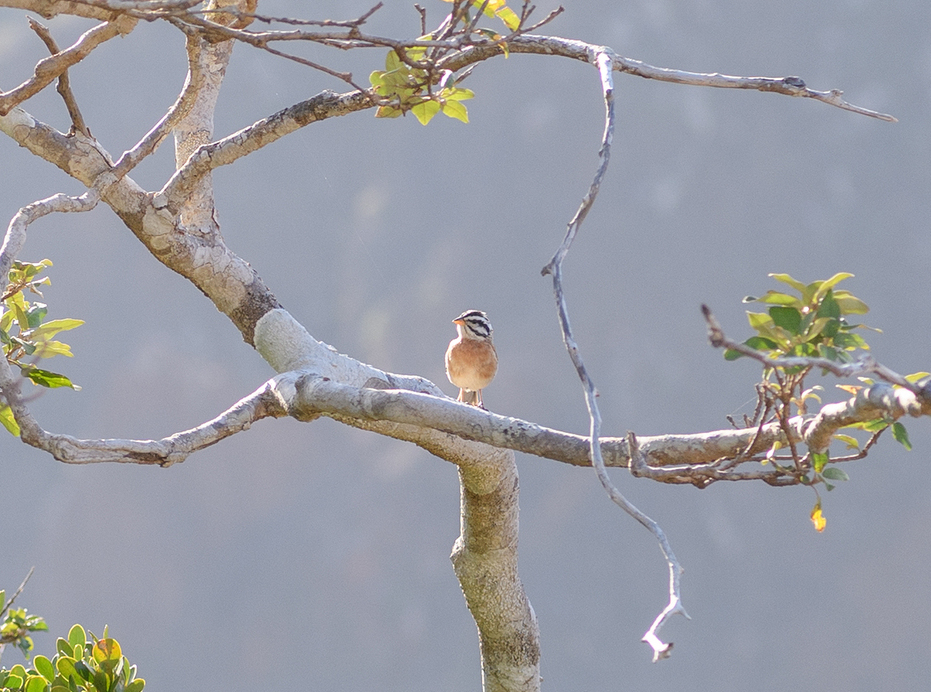

Conservation status
- Near Threatened (IUCN 3.1)

Scientific classification
- Kingdom: Animalia
- Phylum: Chordata
- Class: Aves
- Order: Passeriformes
- Family: Emberizidae
- Genus: Fringillaria
- Species: F. socotrana

Binomial name
- Fringillaria socotrana Ogilvie-Grant & Forbes, 1899

= Socotra bunting =

Species of bird

The Socotra bunting (Fringillaria socotrana) is a species of bird in the family Emberizidae.

It is endemic to the island of Socotra, where its natural habitat is subtropical or tropical high-altitude shrubland. It is threatened by habitat loss.

This species was formerly placed in the genus Emberiza. In 2026 it was moved to the resurrected genus Fringillaria based on the results of a 2021 molecular genetic study.

== Gallery ==
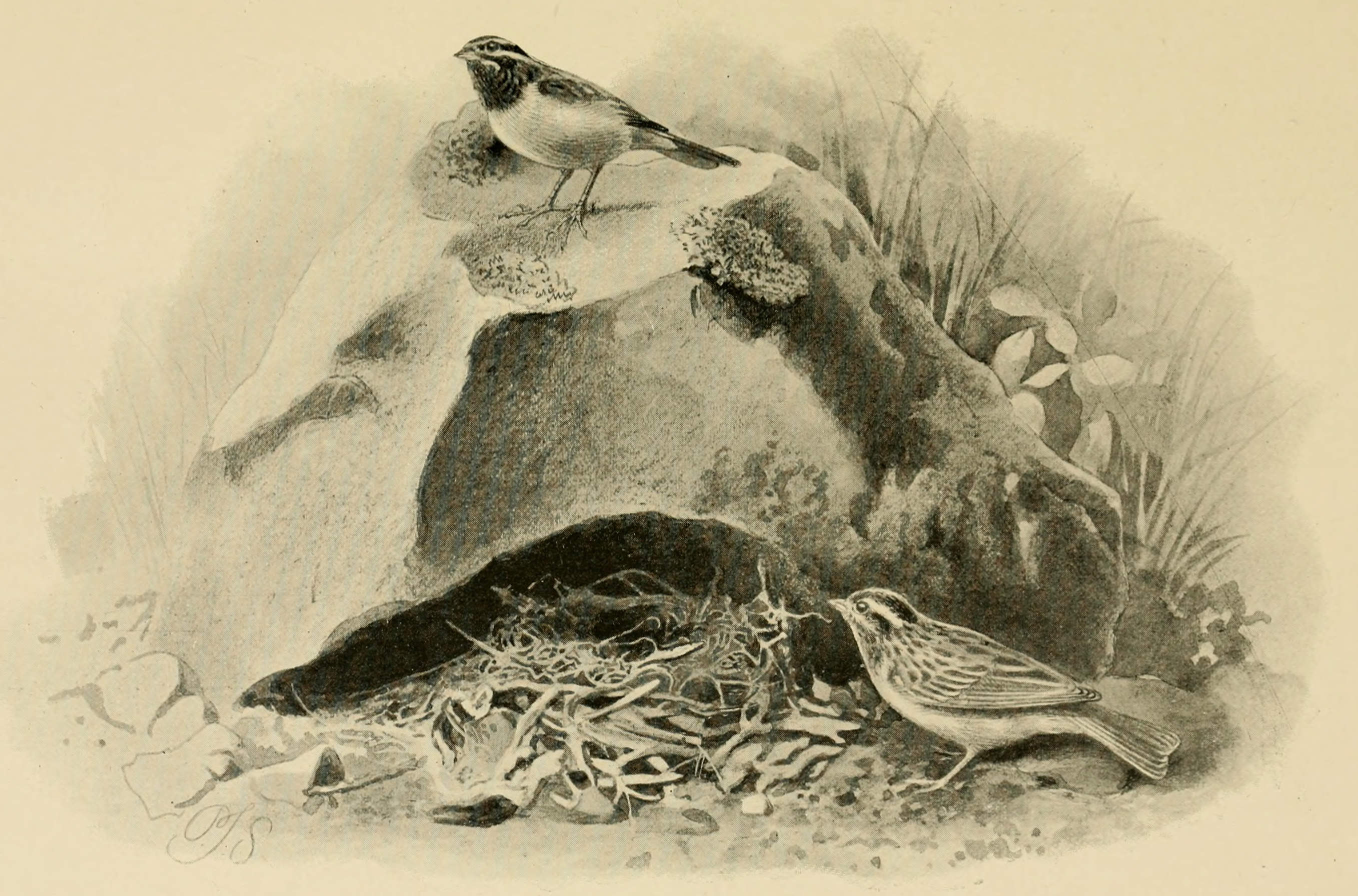
An illustration of a nest in Socotra by P. J. Smit

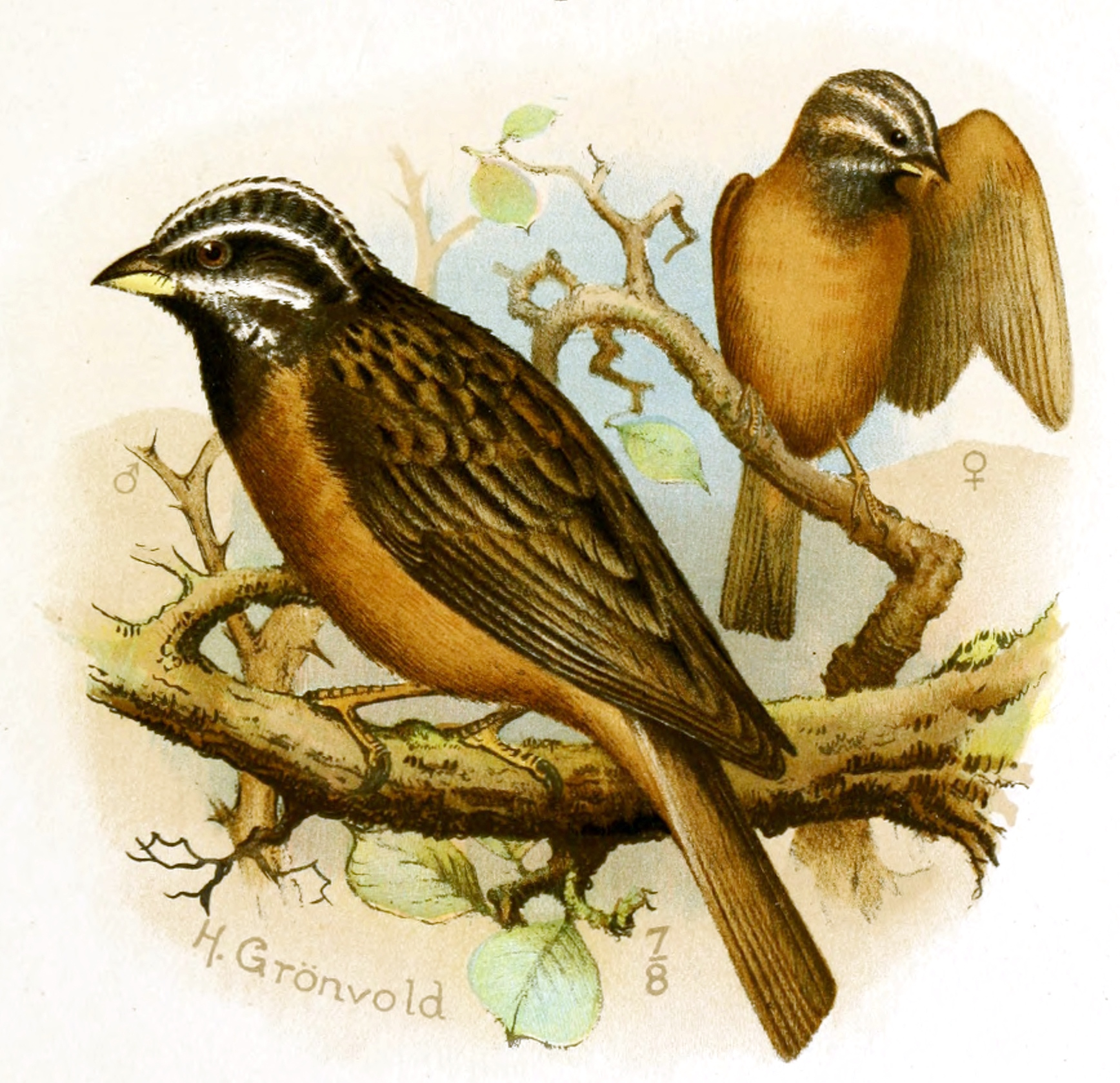
Illustration of the Socotra subspecies insularis by Henrik Grönvold
