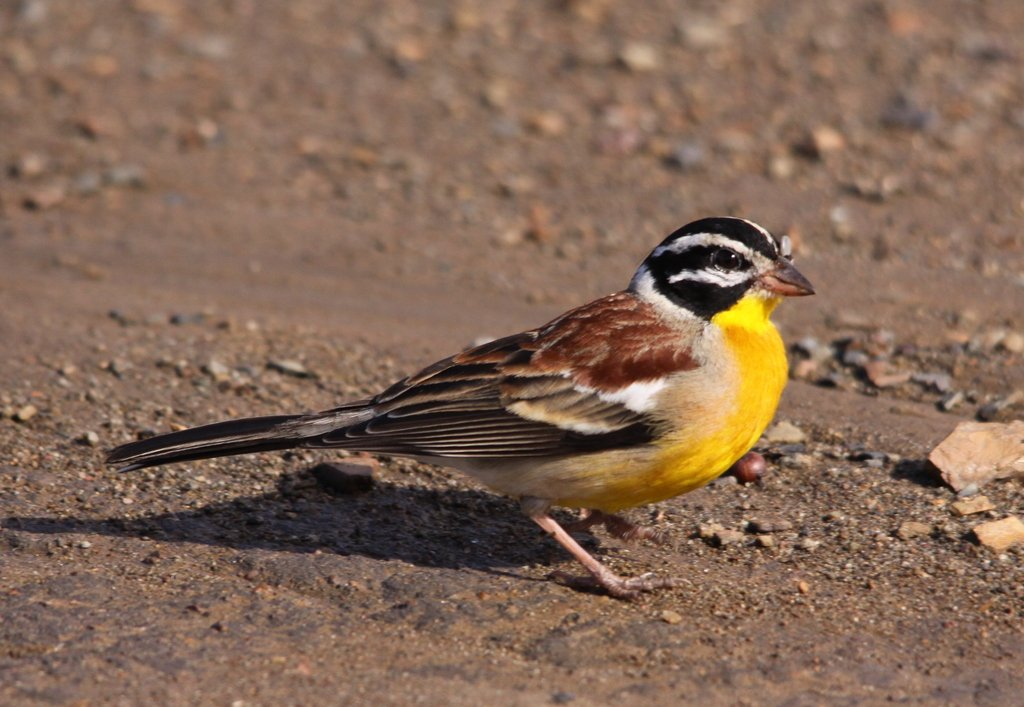
- The nominate subspecies in Hluhluwe-Umfolozi Game Reserve, South Africa

Conservation status
- Least Concern (IUCN 3.1)

Scientific classification
- Kingdom: Animalia
- Phylum: Chordata
- Class: Aves
- Order: Passeriformes
- Family: Emberizidae
- Genus: Fringillaria
- Species: F. flaviventris

Binomial name
- Fringillaria flaviventris (Stephens, 1815)

Synonyms
- Fringillaria flaviventris

Audio
- Song of nominate subspecies recorded at Loteni in the Drakensberg, South Africa

= Golden-breasted bunting =

Species of bird

The golden-breasted bunting (Fringillaria flaviventris) is a passerine bird in the bunting family Emberizidae. It occurs in dry open woodlands and moist savanna in Africa south of the Sahara, but is absent from the equatorial forest belt.

== Taxonomy and etymology ==
The genus name Fringillaria is a variant of the genus Fringilla that was introduced by Carl Linnaeus in 1758. The word fringilla is Latin meaning "finch". The specific flaviventris is from Latin flavus - "yellow", "golden-yellow"; and venter, ventris - "belly". The origin of the English "bunting" is unknown.

This species was formerly placed in the genus Emberiza. In 2026 it was moved to the resurrected genus Fringillaria based on the results of a 2021 molecular genetic study.

=== Subspecies ===
Four subspecies are recognised:

- F. f. flavigaster (Cretzschmar, 1828) – southern edge of the Sahara from Mauritania to Eritrea
- F. f. kalaharica (Roberts, 1932) – southern South Sudan and central and southeastern Angola southward to northeastern Namibia, Botswana, Mozambique, and northern South Africa
- F. f. princeps (Clancey & Winterbottom, 1960) – northern and northwestern Namibia to southwestern Angola
- F. f. flaviventris (Stephens, 1815) – southern and eastern Cape Province to KwaZulu-Natal

== Description ==
The golden-breasted bunting is 15–16 cm long. The adult male has striking head pattern with a white crown, black lateral crown stripes, white supercilium and black-bordered white ear coverts. The underparts are orange-yellow becoming yellow on the throat and whitish on the lower belly. The upperparts are chestnut with a grey rump. The browner wings have two conspicuous white wing bars. The sexes are very similar, but females may have a buff tone to the white head markings and browner head stripes, and the back may have dark streaks. Young birds are duller and paler than the females.

Subspecies E. f. princeps is similar to the nominate subspecies, but larger, and paler below. E. f. flavigaster is more distinctive, having a paler, redder back, pale grey rump, paler yellow underparts and whiter flanks.

== Habitat and biome ==
This species is found in a variety of open woodlands. The subspecies flavigaster favours acacia steppe and savannah, with the other subspecies occurring in a wider range of lightly wooded country including gardens.

== Behaviour ==
Call note

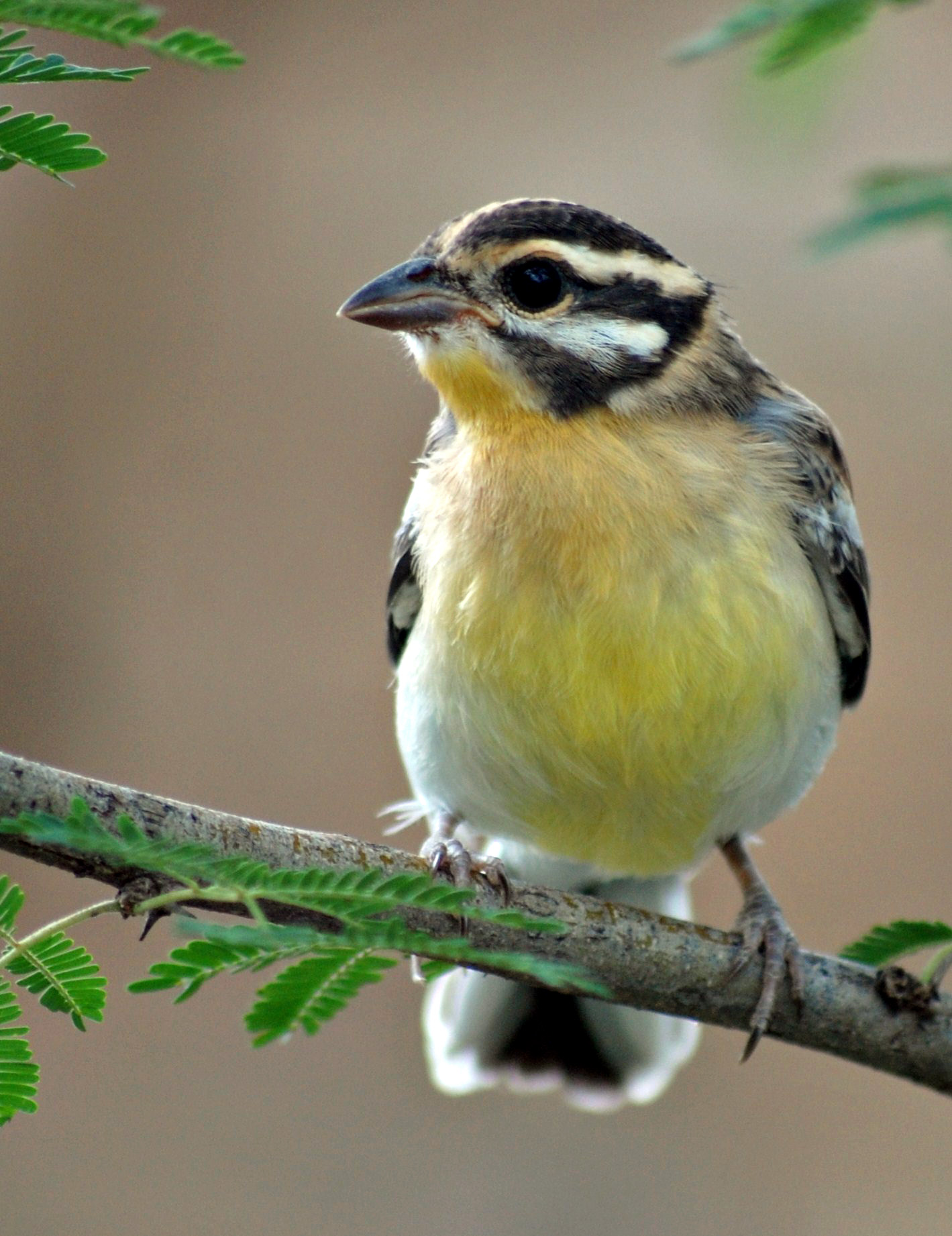
Juvenile in Namibia

The golden-breasted bunting's call is a nasal ascending zzhrr. The song is variable, but includes a weechee weechee weechee.

The golden-breasted bunting builds an untidy cup nest lined with fine grass or hair low in a shrub or sapling. The two or three eggs are glossy white or cream and marked with black lines. The eggs hatch in 12–13 days and the chicks fledge in another 16–17 days.

The golden-breasted bunting is not gregarious, and is normally seen alone, in pairs or small groups. It feeds on the ground on seeds, insects and spiders, animal prey being taken mostly when the birds have young. This species is generally resident, but there appears to be degree of local movement. It is often quite tame.
