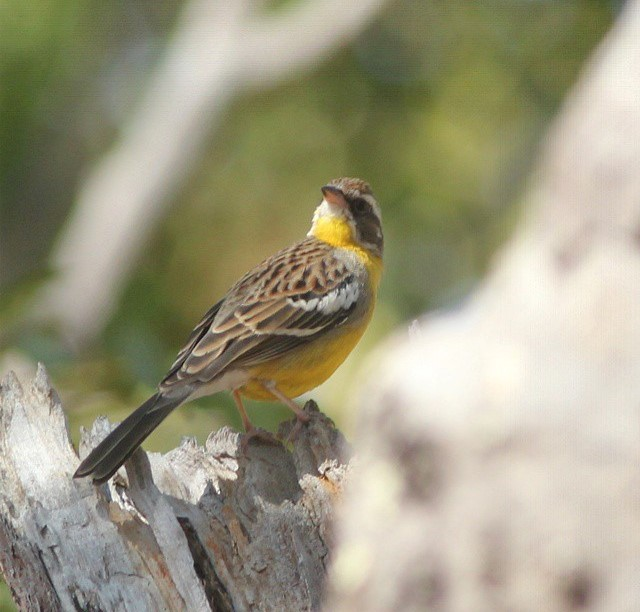
- E. c. cognominata at Menongue, Angola

Conservation status
- Least Concern (IUCN 3.1)

Scientific classification
- Kingdom: Animalia
- Phylum: Chordata
- Class: Aves
- Order: Passeriformes
- Family: Emberizidae
- Genus: Fringillaria
- Species: F. cabanisi

Binomial name
- Fringillaria cabanisi (Reichenow, 1875)

= Cabanis's bunting =

Species of bird

Cabanis's bunting (Fringillaria cabanisi) is a species of bird in the family Emberizidae.

It is found across most of sub-Saharan Africa in its natural habitats of subtropical or tropical dry forests and dry savannah.

The common name and Latin binomial commemorate the German ornithologist Jean Louis Cabanis.

This species was formerly placed in the genus Emberiza. In 2026 it was moved to the resurrected genus Fringillaria based on the results of a 2021 molecular genetic study.
