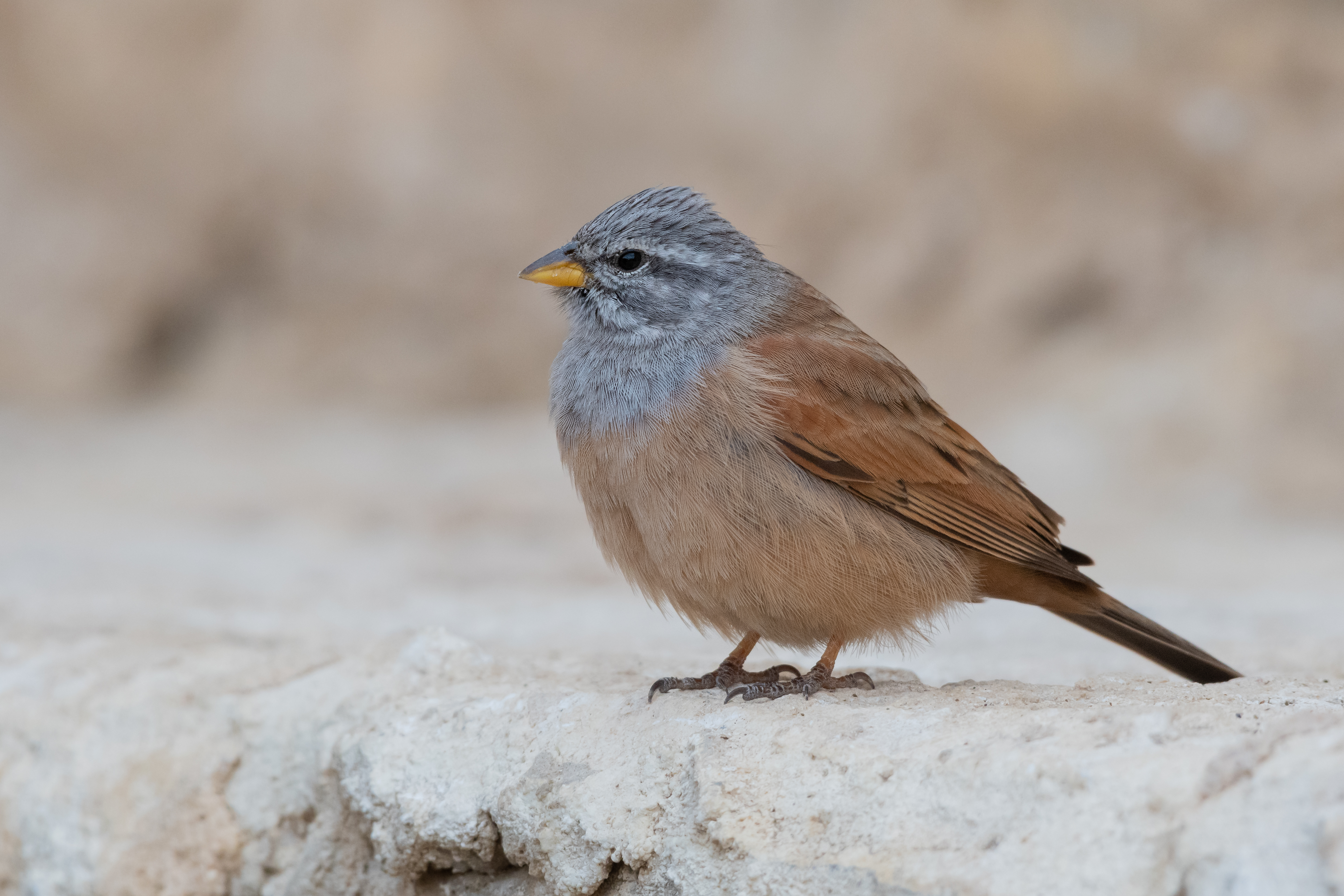

Conservation status
- Least Concern (IUCN 3.1)

Scientific classification
- Kingdom: Animalia
- Phylum: Chordata
- Class: Aves
- Order: Passeriformes
- Family: Emberizidae
- Genus: Fringillaria
- Species: F. sahari

Binomial name
- Fringillaria sahari (Levaillant, 1850)

Synonyms
- Emberiza striolata sahari

= House bunting =

Species of bird

The house bunting (Fringillaria sahari) is a passerine bird in the bunting family Emberizidae that is a resident breeder in rocky areas of northern Africa.

== Taxonomy ==
This species was formerly placed in the genus Emberiza. In 2026 it was moved to the resurrected genus Fringillaria based on the results of a 2021 molecular genetic study.

The house bunting has been split from the closely related striolated bunting, of which it used to be treated as a subspecies, Emberiza striolata sahari. The striolated bunting has stronger facial striping and a paler belly than the house bunting.

Two subspecies are recognised:

- Fringillaria sahari sahari (Verreaux, J & Verreaux, É, 1855) – Morocco eastward to northwestern Libya and northern Chad
- Fringillaria sahari sanghae (Traylor, 1960) – Mauritania and northern Senegal eastward to eastern Chad

== Description ==
It is 14 cm long, similar in size to the striolated bunting and smaller than the rock bunting. The breeding male has a sandy orange-brown body and a grey head slightly dark-streaked but without the white supercilium that the striolated bunting has. The female's head has a brown tint to the grey, and more diffused streaking.

The song, given from a perch, is similar to but weaker than that of the common chaffinch.

== Distribution ==
The house bunting is a resident breeder of dry country from northwestern Africa from Morocco south to Mali and east to Chad. In Morocco, the species has expanded from the Atlas Mountains northwards since the 1960s, and has recently reached Tangier and Tétouan on the southern shore of the Strait of Gibraltar. The house bunting bred in Europe for the first time in 2023, in Algeciras in southern Spain.

== Behaviour ==
=== Breeding ===
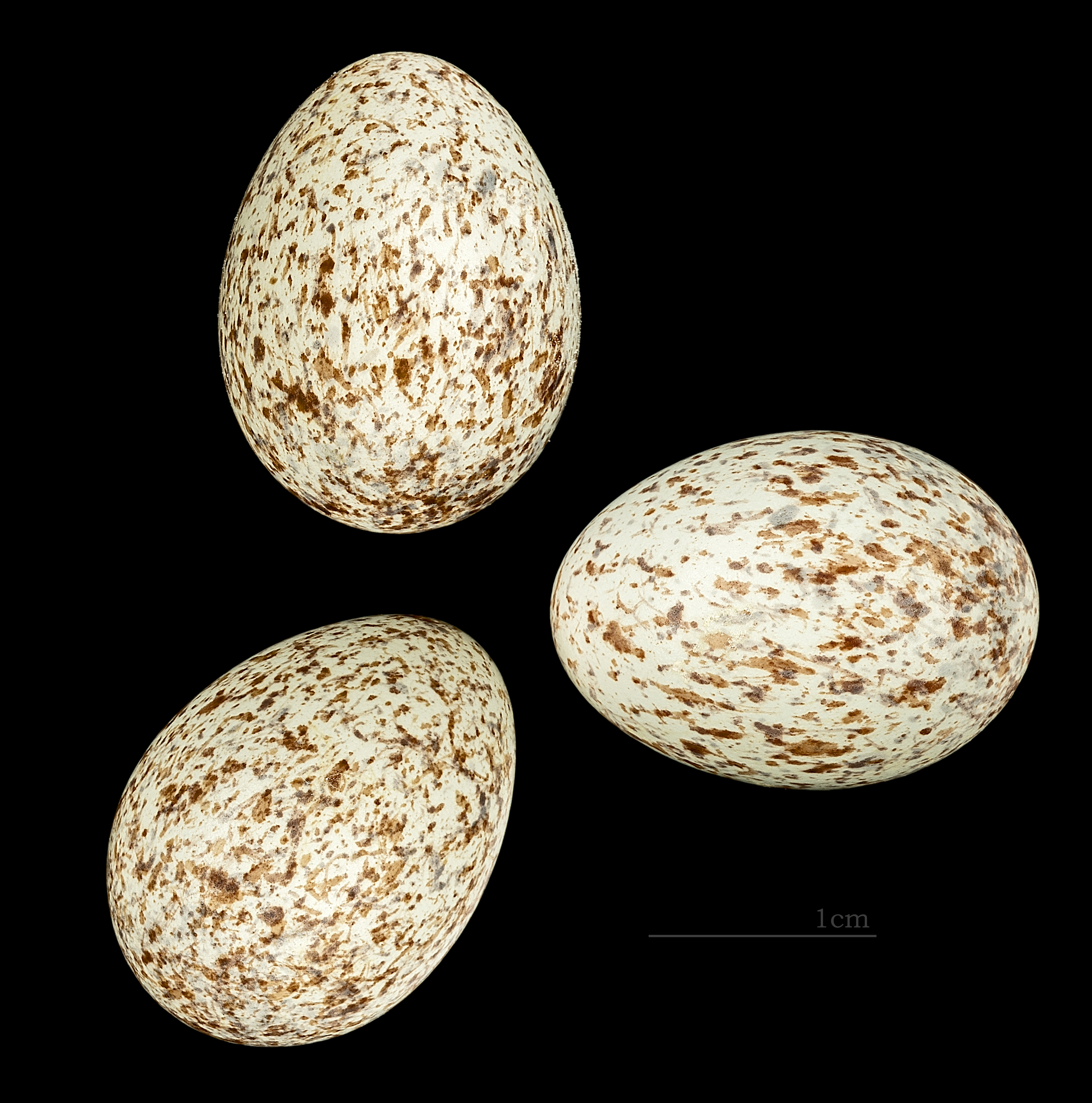
Eggs MHNT

The house bunting breeds around human habitation, laying two to four eggs in a nest in a hole in a wall or building. Its natural food consists seeds, or when feeding young, insects. The incubation period of the clutch of three eggs is 12–14 days.

In Morocco, the species is traditionally regarded as sacred, and has become very tame, freely entering and feeding inside houses, shops and mosques.
