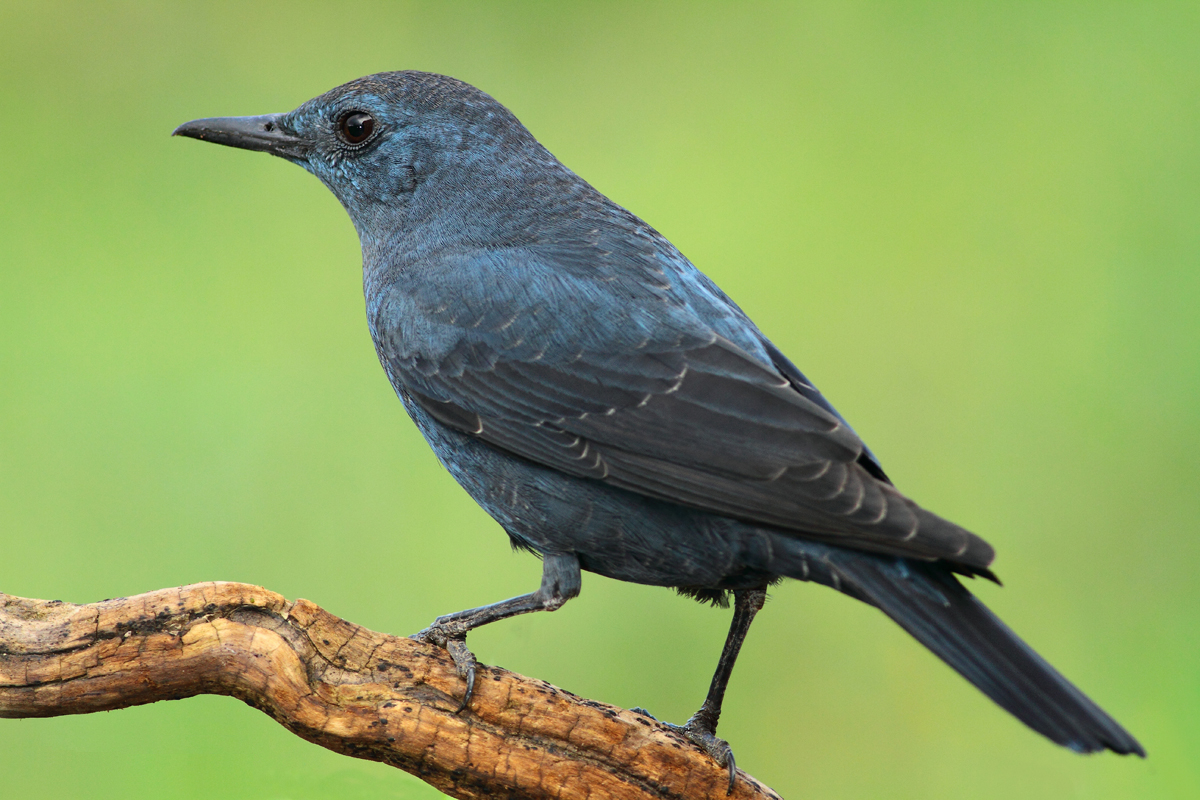
- Male M. s. solitarius
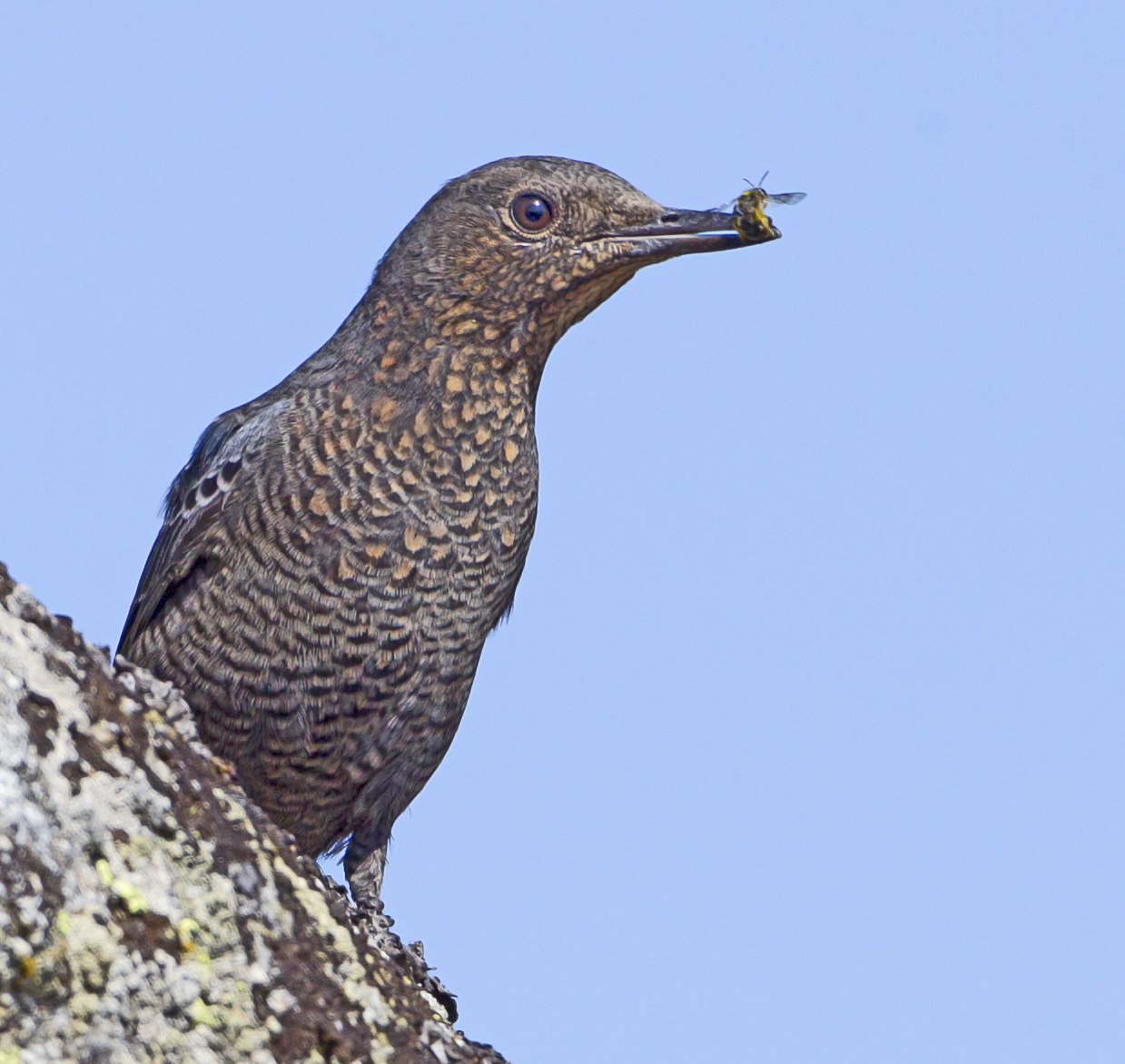
- Female M. s. solitarius

Conservation status
- Least Concern (IUCN 3.1)

Scientific classification
- Kingdom: Animalia
- Phylum: Chordata
- Class: Aves
- Order: Passeriformes
- Family: Muscicapidae
- Genus: Monticola
- Species: M. solitarius

Binomial name
- Monticola solitarius (Linnaeus, 1758)
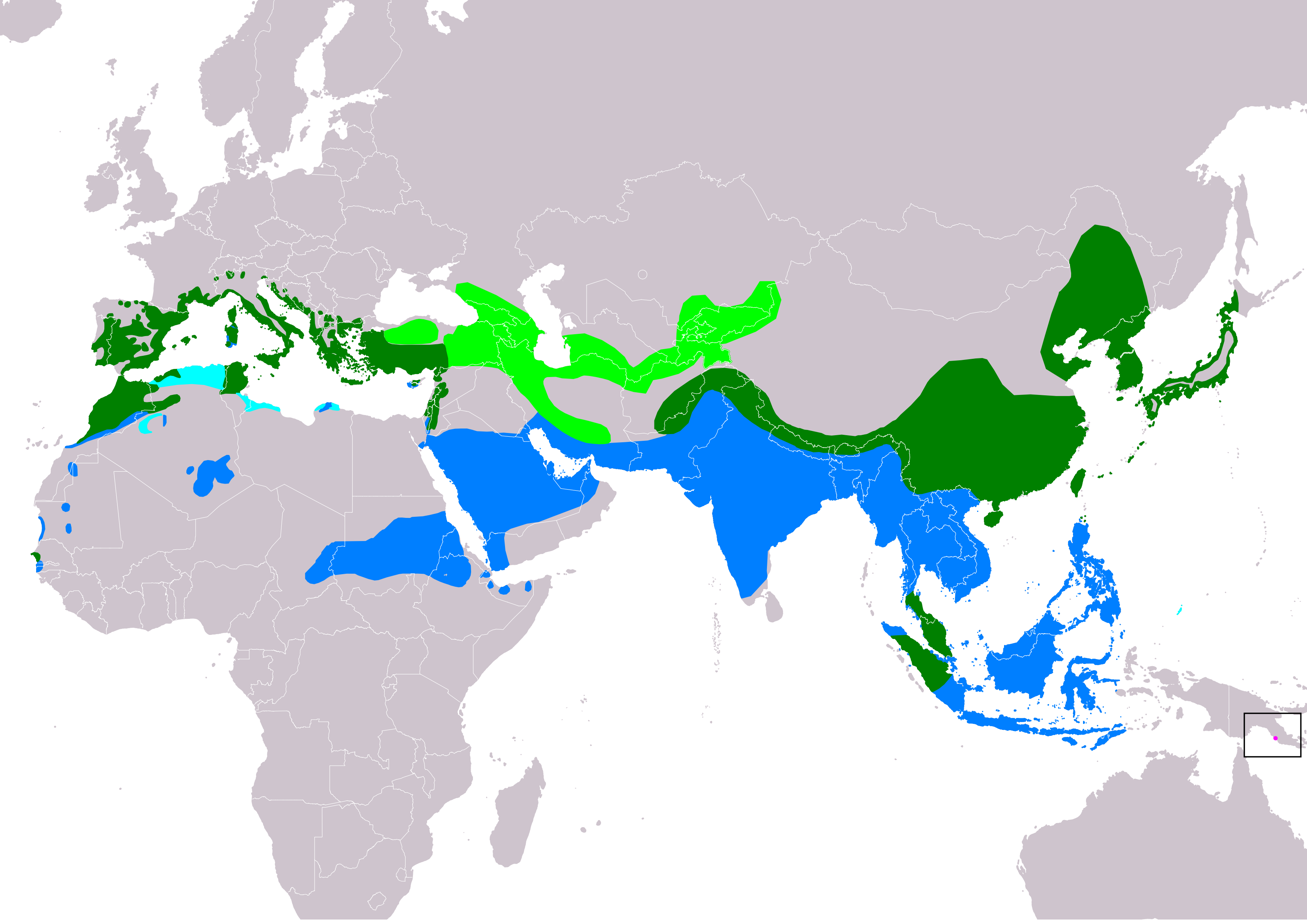
- Range of M. solitarius Breeding Resident Passage Non-breeding Vagrant (seasonality uncertain)

Synonyms
- Turdus solitarius Linnaeus, 1758

= Blue rock thrush =

Species of bird

The blue rock thrush (Monticola solitarius) is a species of chat. This thrush-like Old World flycatcher was formerly placed in the family Turdidae. It breeds in southern Europe, northwest Africa, and from Central Asia to northern China and Malaysia. The blue rock thrush is the official national bird of Malta.

== Taxonomy ==
The blue rock thrush was described by Carl Linnaeus in 1758 in the 10th edition of his Systema Naturae under the binomial name Turdus solitarius. The type locality is Italy. The scientific name is from Latin. Monticola is from mons, montis "mountain", and colere, "to dwell", and the specific epithet solitarius means "solitary".

The rock thrush genus Monticola was formerly placed in the family Turdidae but molecular phylogenetic studies have shown that the species in the genus are more closely related to members of the Old World flycatcher family Muscicapidae.

There are five recognised subspecies:

- M. s. solitarius (Linnaeus, 1758) – northwest Africa, south Europe, north Turkey to Georgia and Azerbaijan.
- M. s. longirostris (Blyth, 1847) – Greece and west and south Turkey through the Middle East to the northwest Himalayas to northeast Africa and India
- M. s. pandoo (Sykes, 1832) – central Himalayas to east China and north Vietnam to Greater Sunda Islands
- M. s. philippensis (Statius Müller, 1776) – east Mongolia to Sakhalin south to Japan, extreme north Philippines and northeast China to Indonesia
- M. s. madoci Chasen, 1940 – Malay Peninsula and north Sumatra

There is a proposal to split Monticola solitarius into two species. The ground work for this was two papers published in 2004 and 2007. The 2004 paper by Voelker and Spellman laid the groundwork at the genus and family level, Muscicapidae. The 2007 paper by Outlaw and Voelker refined monophyly and phylogeny. The first formal proposal for the split was in 2010 by Zuccon and Ericson, which proposed a western taxon comprising M. s. solitarius and M. s. longirostris and an eastern taxon with M. s. philippensis, M. s. pandoo and M. s. madoci Zuccon and Ericson proposed the two species names be M. solitarius s.s. and M. philippensis. As of early 2026 there is still no agreement on the split, a major reason being that the five subspecies can interbreed.

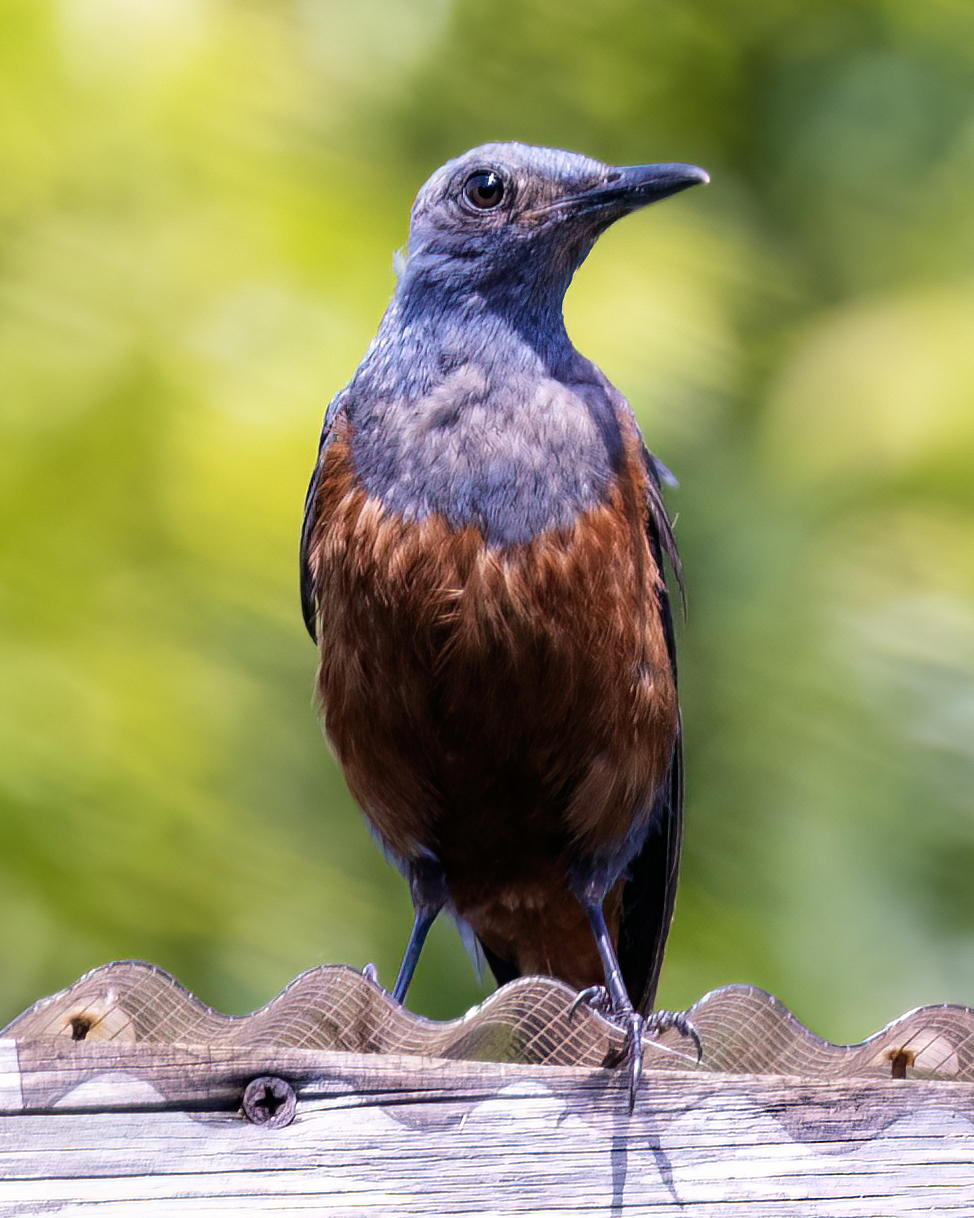
Male blue rock thrush of subspecies M. s. philippensis showing rufous underbelly

== Description ==
The blue rock thrush is a starling-sized bird, 21–23 cm (8.3–9.1 in) in length with a long slim bill. The breeding male of the nominate subspecies is unmistakable, with all blue-grey plumage apart from its darker wings. Females and immatures are much less striking, with dark brown upperparts, and paler brown scaly underparts. The male of the subspecies M. s. philippensis has rufous-chestnut plumage from the mid-breast down to the undertail. Both sexes lack the reddish outer tail feathers of rock thrush.

=== Vocalizations ===
The male blue rock thrush sings a clear, melodious call that is similar to, but louder than, the call of the rock thrush.

Female blue rock thrush in Spain singing

The Europe and Asia groups both have a "short song and a long song, consisting of similar melodious whistles, trills and more burry notes." Generally, the vocalizations are similar in both groups. Basic sound traits generally overlap, such as phrase duration, note length, and min./max. frequency. Several notes are identical. The long song is a bit more common in the Asia group. Among populations in Indonesia, there are four basic calls. "The fundamental call frequency appeared to be concentrated around 1.6 kHz, but weak components of the spectrum reached to approximately 4 kHz. The structure of the four call types was quite different: 1) the shape of the spectra differed considerably; 2) the frequency of maximum sound energy was between 1.2 and 1.8 kHz; 3) the duration of the calls varied between 200 and 1500 ms; 4) the-10dB bandwidth was in the range between 900 Hz and 1300 Hz."

=== Similar species ===
Monticola is a monophyletic clade as all member species share a common ancestor. M. solitarius are especially similar to: Blue-capped rock thrush (M. cinclorhynchus, distinguished by a bright blue head and chestnut belly), Chestnut-bellied Rock Thrush (M. rufiventris, distinguished by a chestnut belly), Common rock thrush-also known as Rufous-tailed rock thrush (M. saxatilis, distinguished by blue-grey head, white back patch, chestnut belly), Little rock thrush (M. rufocinereus, distinguished by blue-grey upper and orange belly), and White-throated rock thrush (M. gularis, distinguished by blue head, orange belly, and white patch on black wings).

== Distribution and habitat ==
The European, north African and southeast Asian birds are mainly resident, apart from altitudinal movements. Other Asian populations are more migratory, wintering in sub-Saharan Africa, India and southeast Asia. This bird is a very uncommon visitor to northern and western Europe. There is some overlap in breeding and wintering ranges with the common rock thrush (Monticola saxatilis); Palearctic and southwestern Asia for breeding and northern Africa for wintering. It is known to have been spotted in North America three times: once in British Columbia in 1997, once in Oregon and the Farallon Islands in 2024, and most recently in Portland in September of 2026. It is unclear whether the Oregon and Farallon Islands spottings were the same bird. It is highly unlikely that the British Columbia sighting was the same individual bird as the Oregon/Farallon Islands sighting as the blue rock thrush typically lives 5-10 years in the wild.

Choi, et al., conducted a study of blue rock thrush population on Hongdo Island, South Korea from 2005-2009. The species arrives in spring and disappeared in autumn, indicating that the Hongdo population is migratory rather than resident. Breeding density was estimated at about 8 breeding pairs per km², and individual territories averaged about 2.87 hectares. The species showed a strong preference for rocky cliffs for their homes, especially exposed rock faces. They concluded habitat structure was more important than food availabity.

In the first confirmed case of successful urban nest by M. solitarius, Rouibi, et al., conducted a study of M. solitarius in El Bouni, Algeria over three breeding seasons from 2016- 2018. They found the species made a nest beneath the roof of a residential building, which is very different from its usual rocky cliffs, escarpments, and coastal outcrops. Pairs have also been found living in urban areas in Malta.

== Behaviour ==
The blue rock thrush breeds in open mountainous areas. It nests in rock cavities and walls, and usually lays 3–5 eggs. An omnivore, the blue rock thrush eats a wide variety of insects and small reptiles in addition to berries and seeds.

== In culture ==
The blue rock thrush is deeply imbedded in Maltese culture (the word for it in Maltese being Merill). It became the national bird in 1971. It was on the Lm 1 coins that were part of the country's former currency. It has also inspired place names, songs, stamps, cartoons, poems and literature, and old expressions about talkativeness. It is also the name of a high income fund and a child care center.

== Gallery ==
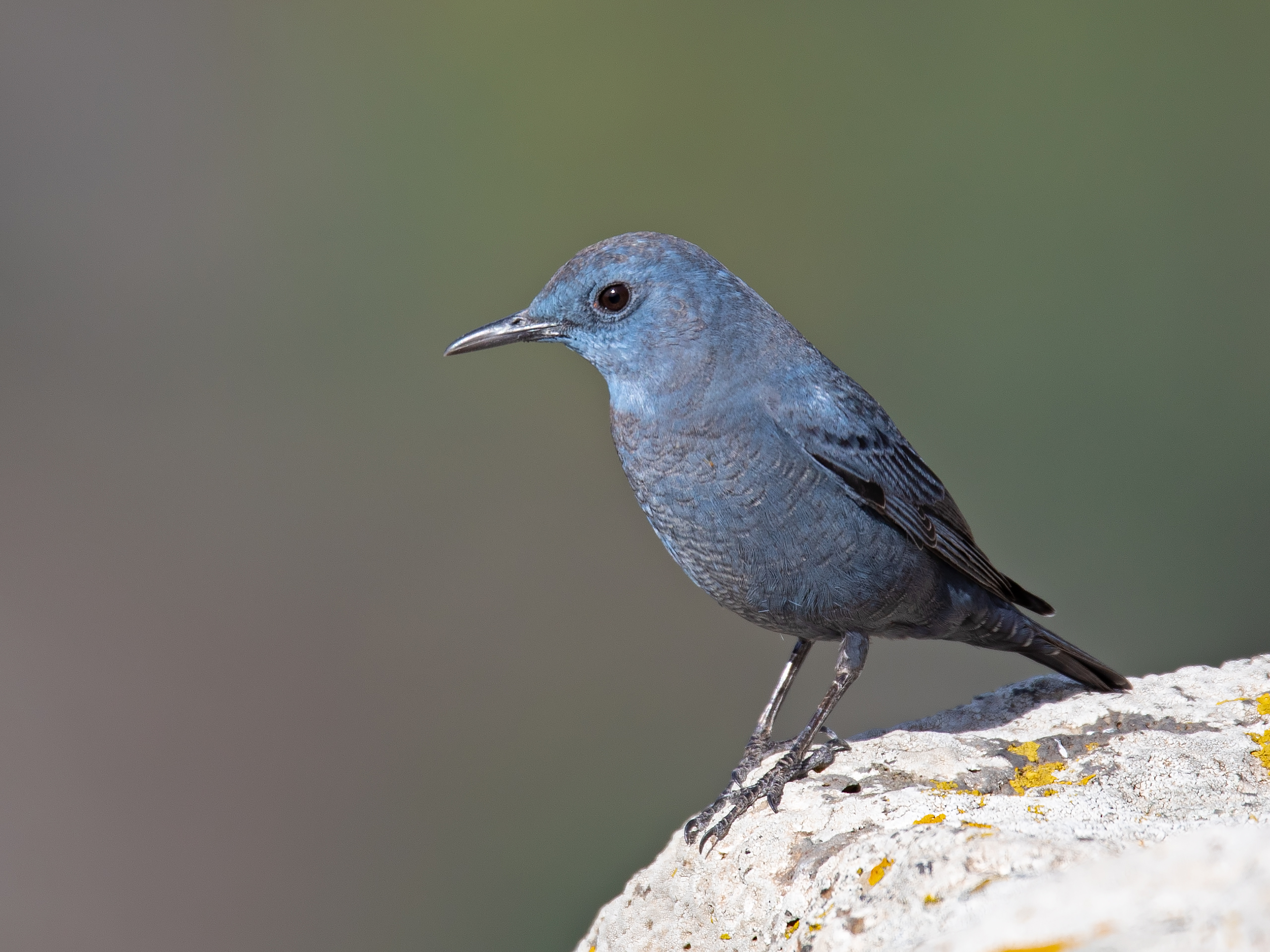
Male in January, Gamla Nature Reserve, Israel

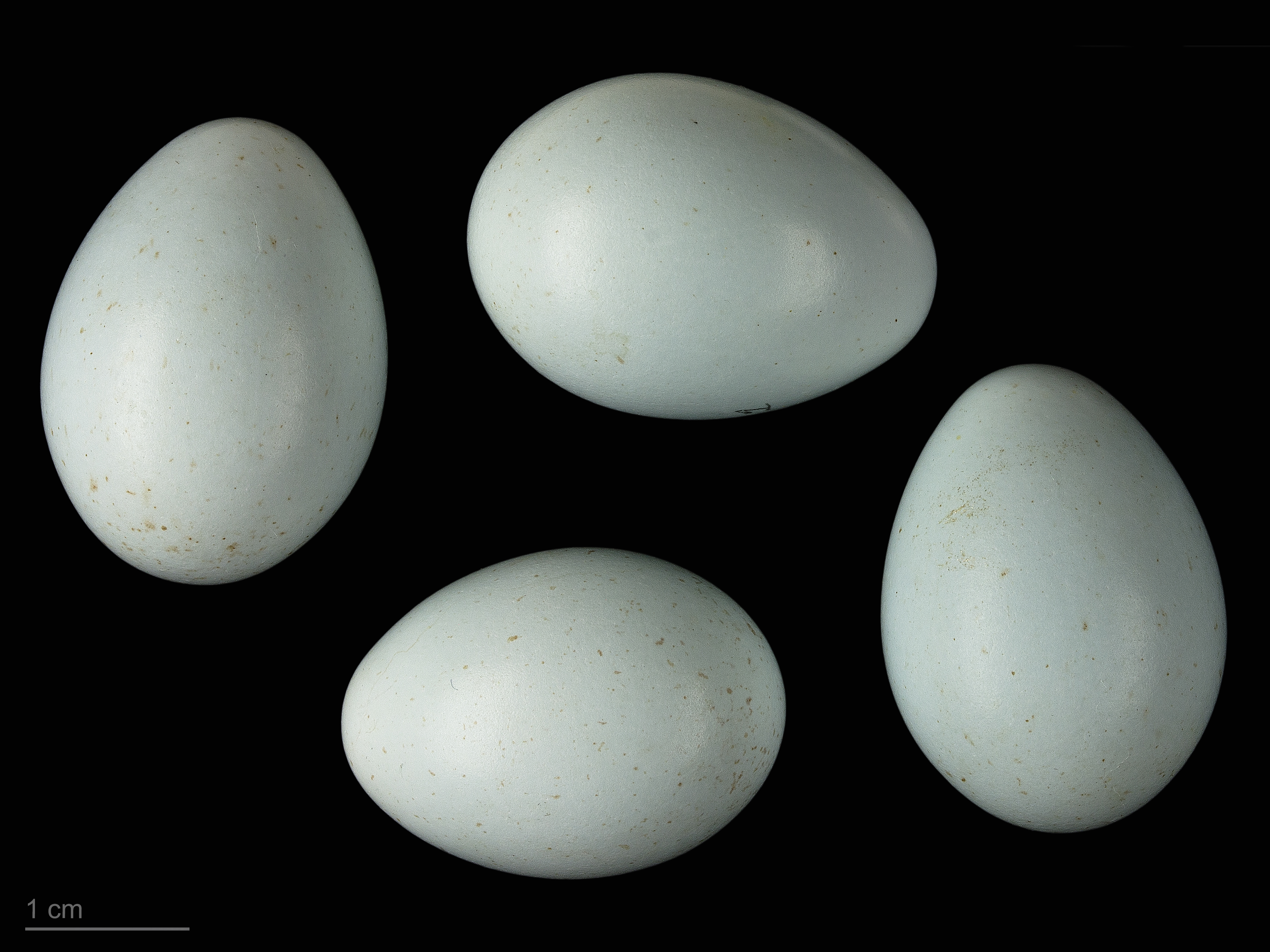
Monticola solitarius solitarius – MHNT

Male foraging in Japan
