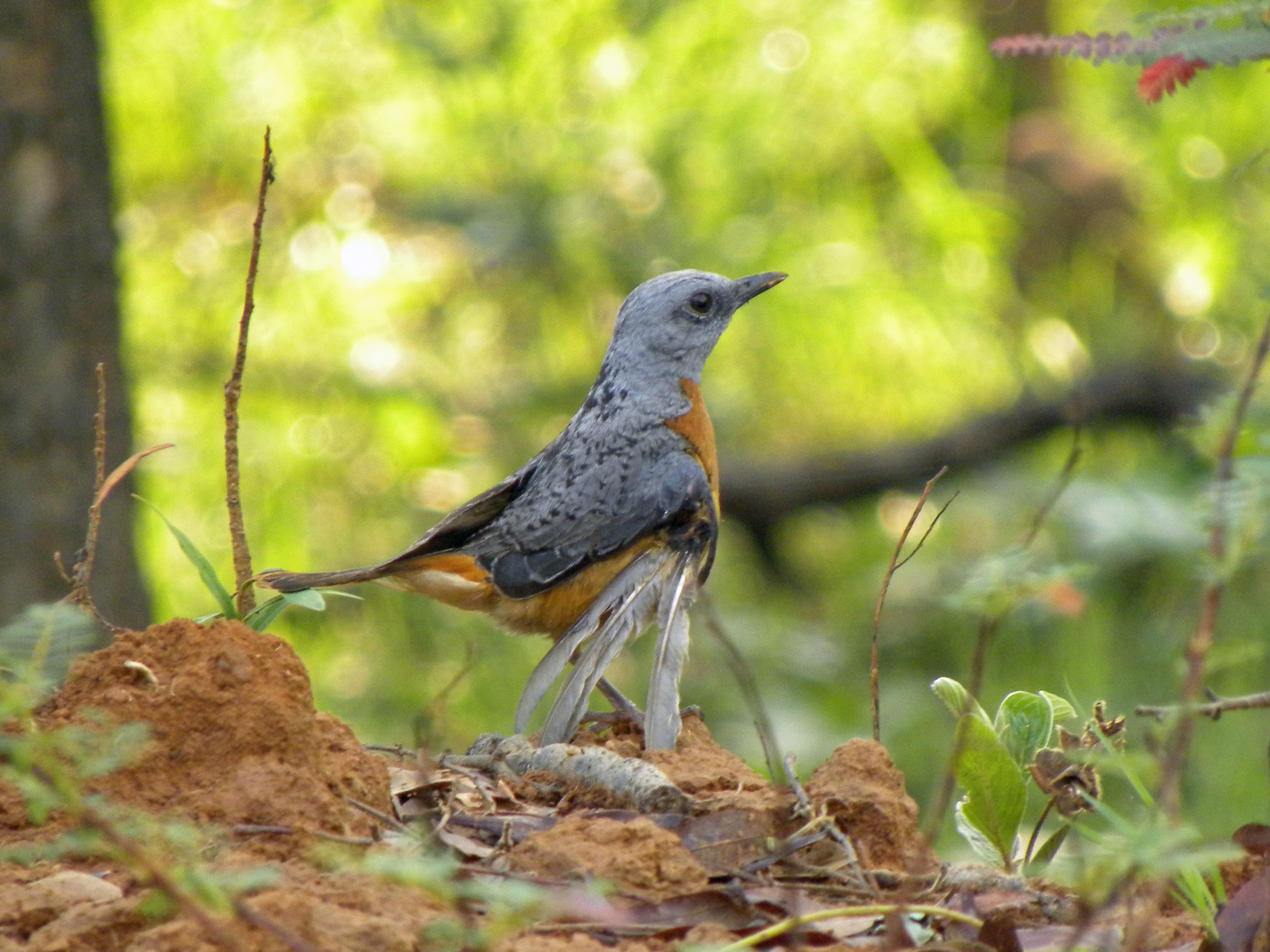

Conservation status
- Least Concern (IUCN 3.1)]

Scientific classification
- Kingdom: Animalia
- Phylum: Chordata
- Class: Aves
- Order: Passeriformes
- Family: Muscicapidae
- Genus: Monticola
- Species: M. angolensis

Binomial name
- Monticola angolensis Sousa, 1888

= Miombo rock thrush =

Species of bird

The Miombo rock thrush (Monticola angolensis) is a species of bird in the family Muscicapidae. It is native to miombo woodland.

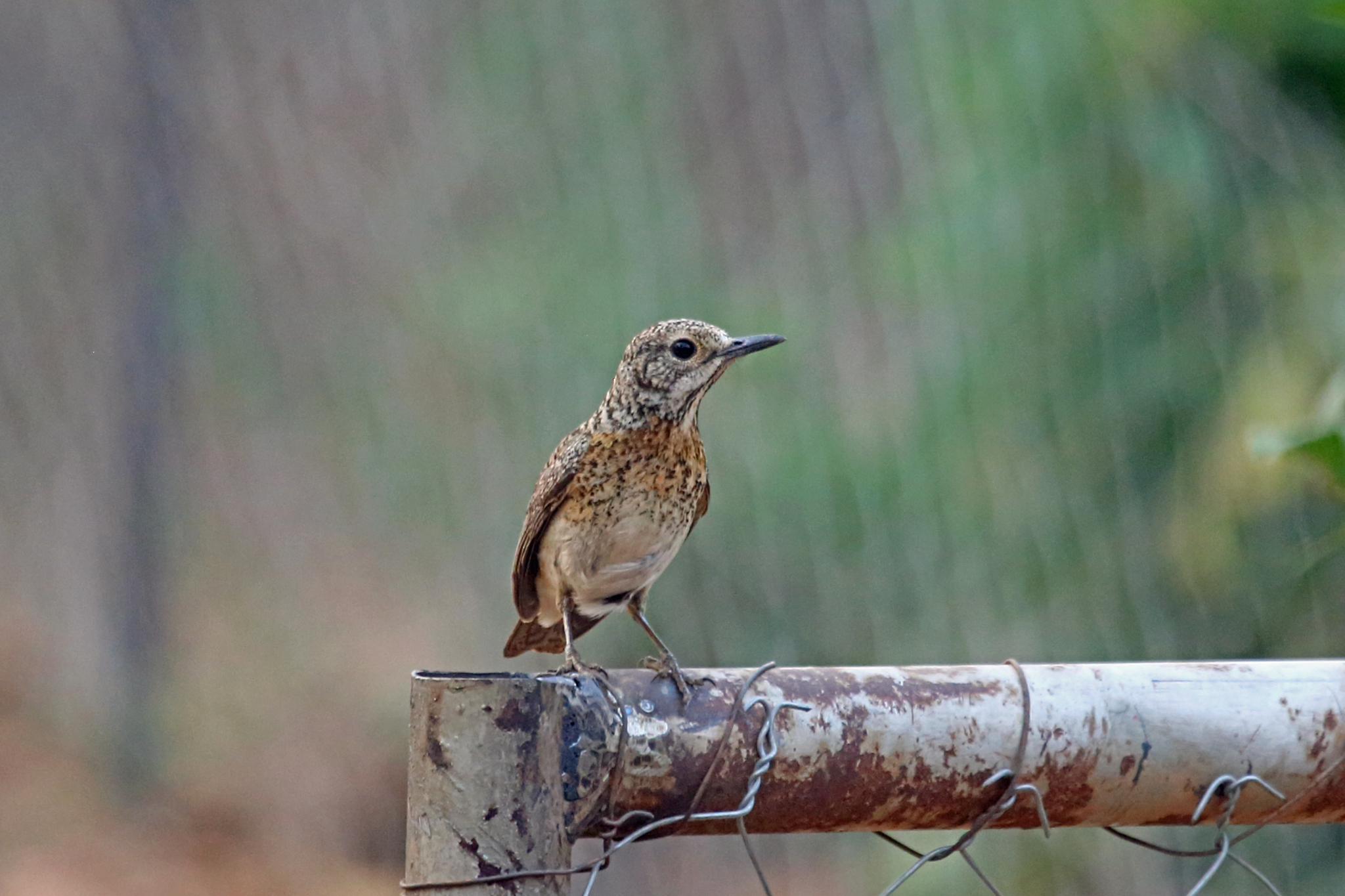
female

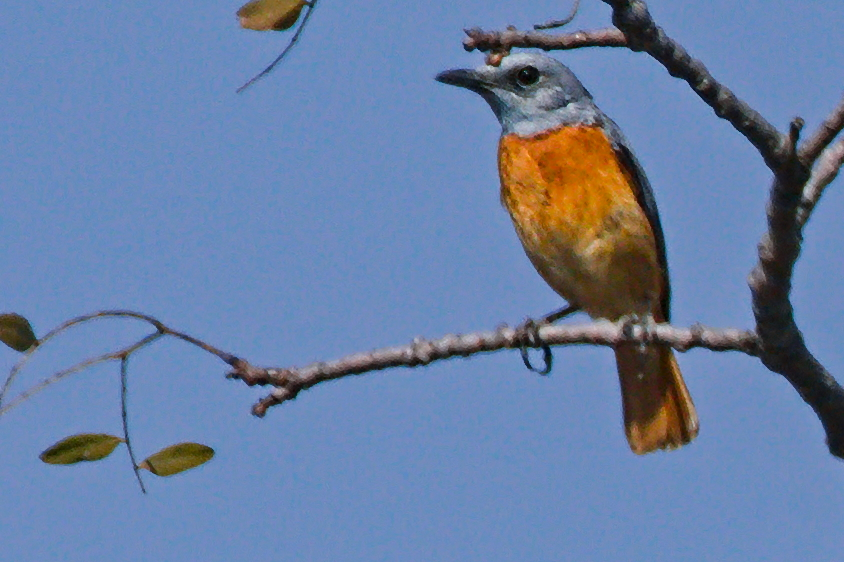
Miombo rock thrush
