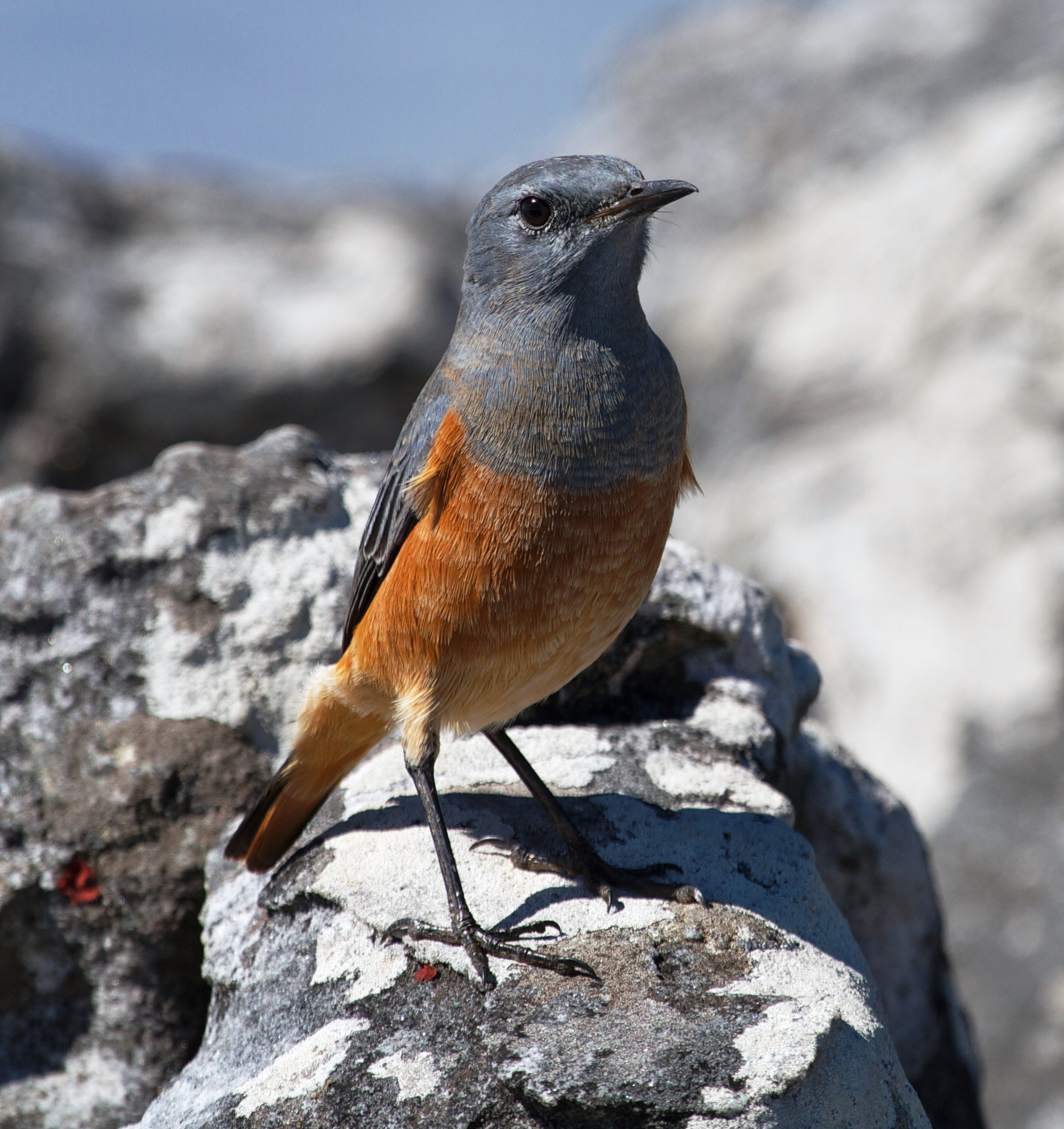

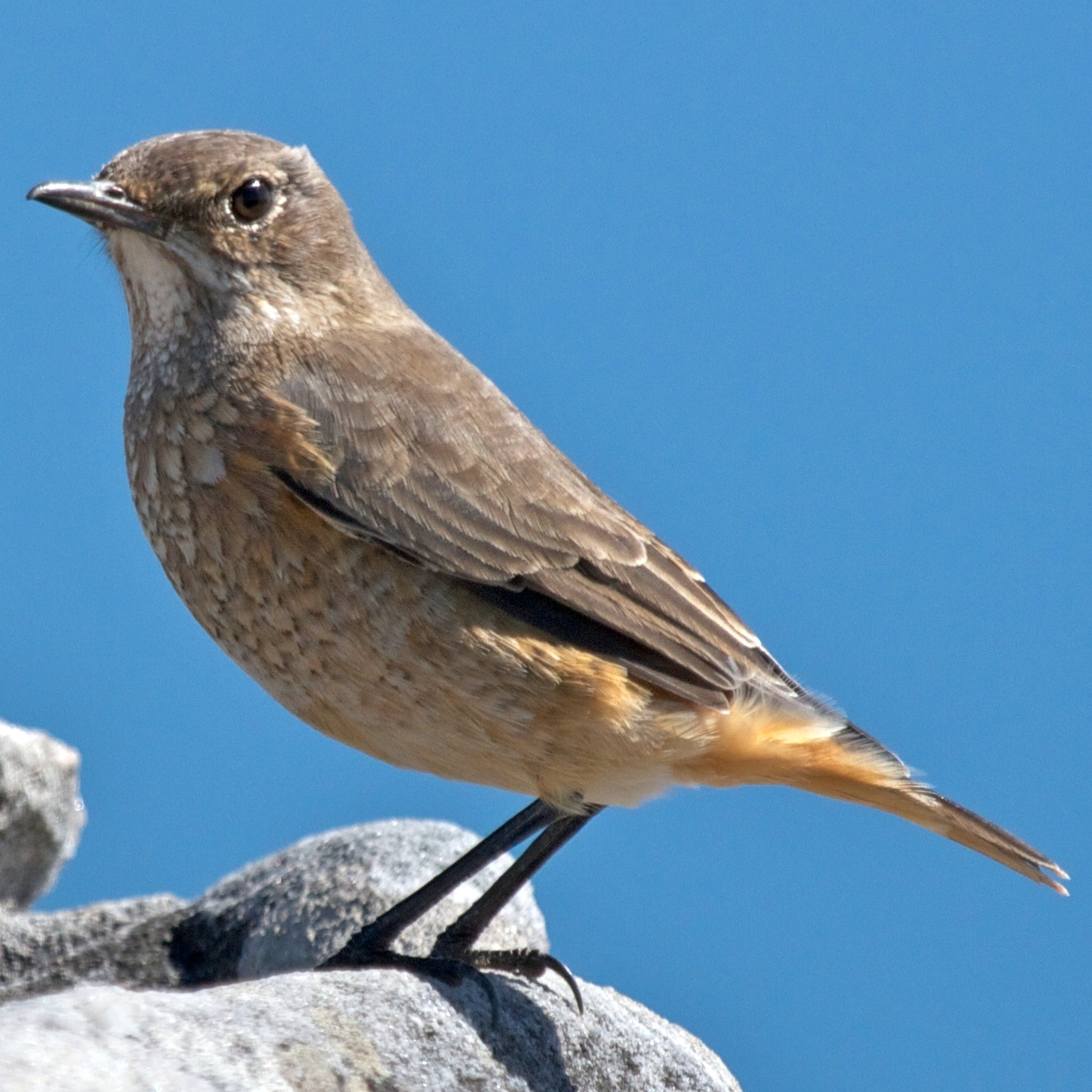
- Male and female in Table Mountain National Park, Cape Town, South Africa

Conservation status
- Near Threatened (IUCN 3.1)

Scientific classification
- Kingdom: Animalia
- Phylum: Chordata
- Class: Aves
- Order: Passeriformes
- Family: Muscicapidae
- Genus: Monticola
- Species: M. explorator

Binomial name
- Monticola explorator (Vieillot, 1818)

= Sentinel rock thrush =

Species of bird

The sentinel rock thrush (Monticola explorator) is a species of passerine bird in the Old World flycatcher family Muscicapidae that is found in Lesotho, South Africa, and Eswatini. Its natural habitat is rocky outcrops in high-altitude grassland.

It is insectivorous.

== Taxonomy ==
The sentinel rock thrush was formally described in 1818 by the French ornithologist Louis Vieillot under the binomial name Turdus explorator. The specific epithet explorator is Latin meaning "scout", "explorer" or "searcher". Vieillot based his account on "L'Espionneur" from the mountains of the Cape of Good Hope that had been described and illustrated in 1802 by the French naturalist François Levaillant in his book Histoire Naturelle des Oiseaux d'Afrique. The sentinel rock thrush is now one of 15 species placed in the genus Monticola that was introduced in 1822 by the German naturalist Friedrich Boie.
