= Monticola pongraczi =

Monticola pongraczi Temporal range: Pliocene

Scientific classification
- Kingdom: Animalia
- Phylum: Chordata
- Class: Aves
- Order: Passeriformes
- Family: Muscicapidae
- Genus: Monticola
- Species: †M. pongraczi

Binomial name
- †Monticola pongraczi Kessler, 2013

Extinct species of bird

Monticola pongraczi is an extinct species of Monticola that inhabited Hungary during the Neogene period.

== Etymology ==
The specific epithet "pongraczi" is a tribute to Pongrácz László who created the "Beszélő Kövek" Foundation.
