= Short-toed rock thrush =

Conservation status
- Least Concern (IUCN 3.1)

Scientific classification
- Kingdom: Animalia
- Phylum: Chordata
- Class: Aves
- Order: Passeriformes
- Family: Muscicapidae
- Genus: Monticola
- Species: M. brevipes

Binomial name
- Monticola brevipes (Waterhouse, 1838)

Species of bird

The short-toed rock thrush (Monticola brevipes) is a species of bird in the family Muscicapidae. It is found in Angola, Botswana, Namibia, and South Africa. Its natural habitat is subtropical or tropical dry shrubland.

Birds in the eastern part of its range are sometimes regarded as a separate species, the Pretoria rock thrush or Transvaal rock thrush (M. pretoriae).

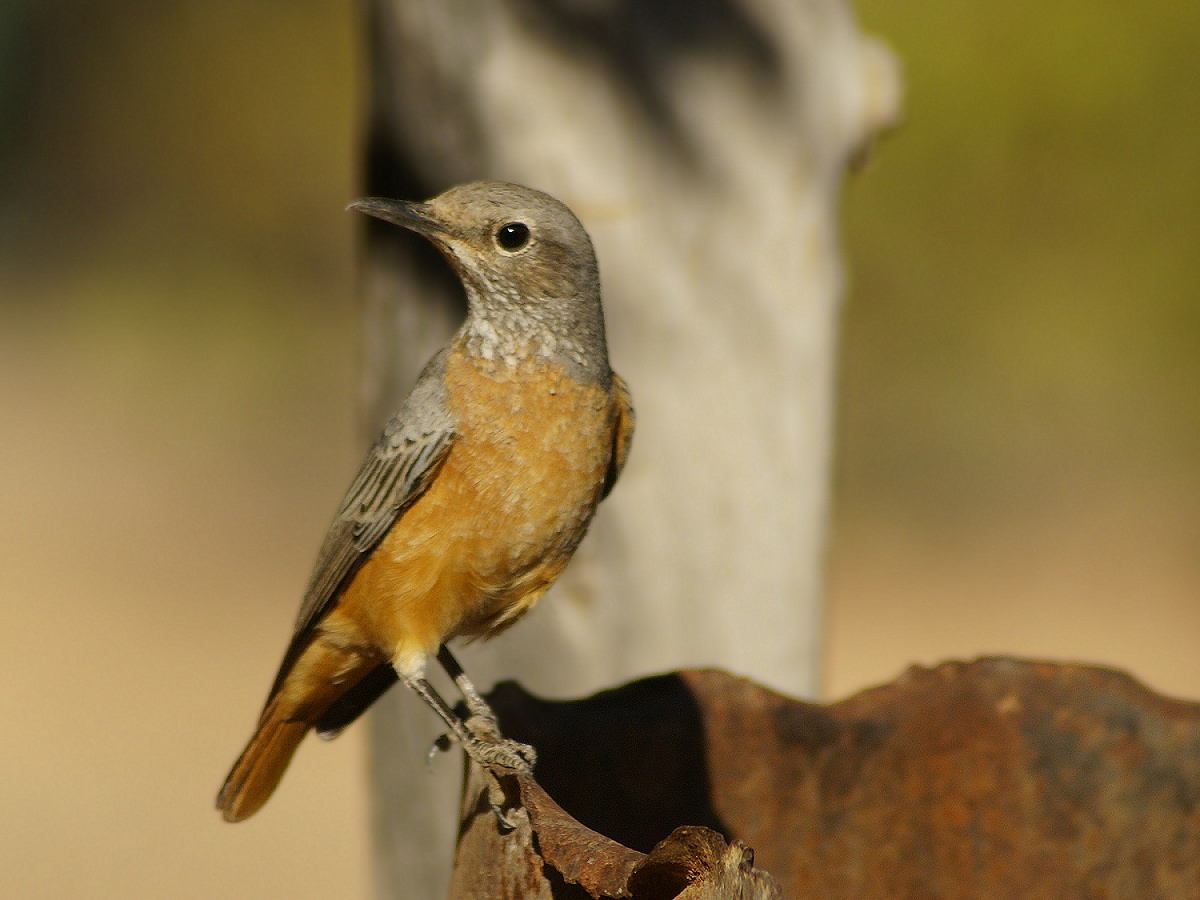
female bird
