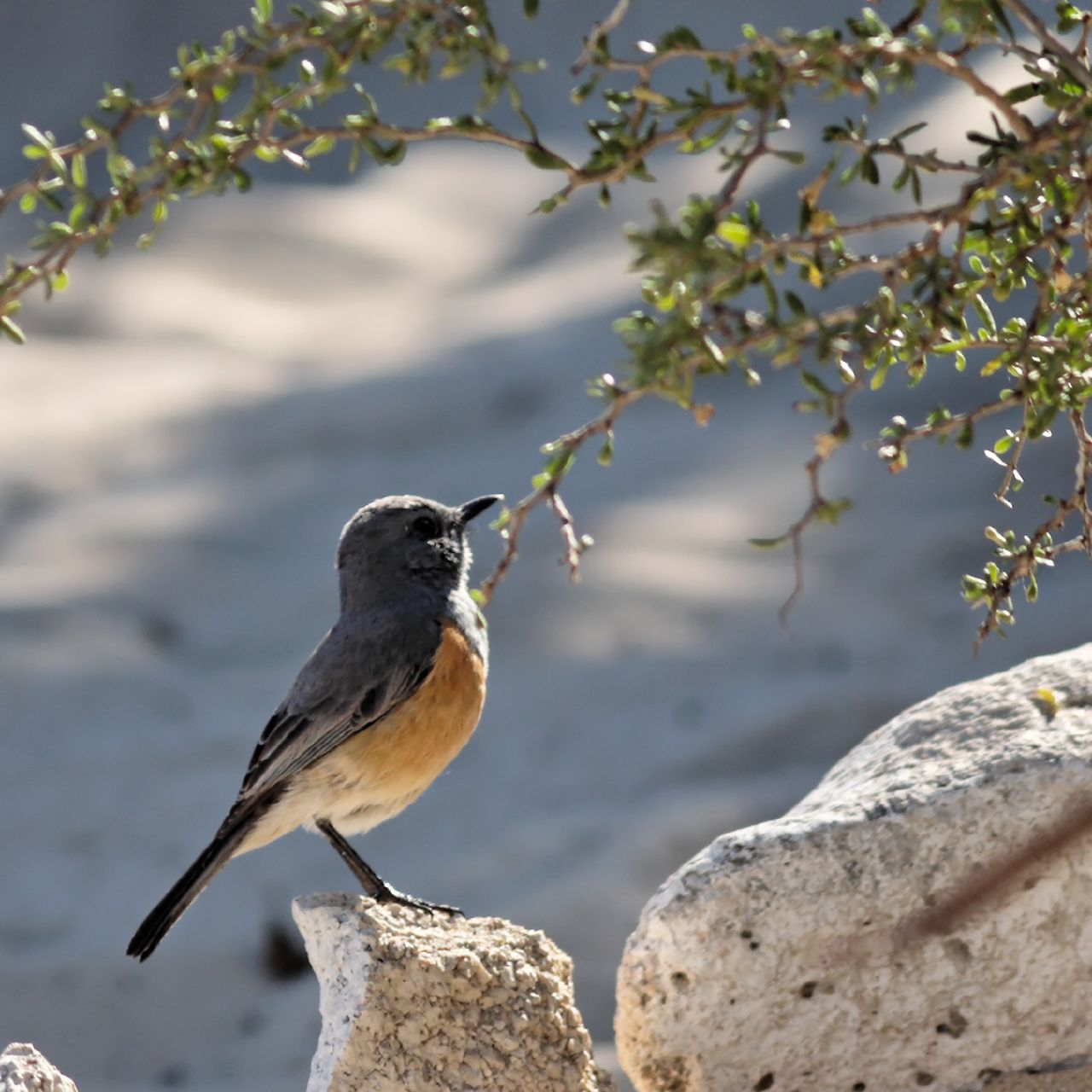
- Adult male

Conservation status
- Least Concern (IUCN 3.1)

Scientific classification
- Kingdom: Animalia
- Phylum: Chordata
- Class: Aves
- Order: Passeriformes
- Family: Muscicapidae
- Genus: Monticola
- Species: M. imerina

Binomial name
- Monticola imerina (Hartlaub, 1860)

Synonyms
- Pseudocossyphus imerinus Monticola imerinus

= Littoral rock thrush =

Species of bird

The littoral rock thrush (Monticola imerina) is a species of bird in the family Muscicapidae. It is endemic to Madagascar.

== Taxonomy ==
When Gustav Hartlaub first described the littoral rock thrush in 1860, he assigned it to the genus Cossypha, believing it to be a robin-chat. It is monotypic, with no distinctive subspecies in its small range.

== Description ==
As with the other rock thrushes, the littoral rock thrush is sexually dimorphic; the male has much more colorful plumage than the female does. He is pale gray on the head, breast, mantle and wing coverts, with dull orange underparts, gray-brown wings and a dark brown tail.

== Habitat and range ==
Endemic to Madagascar, the littoral rock thrush is found only in the country's southern coastal region, from the Onilahy River to Lake Anony, just to the west of Tôlanaro (formerly Fort Dauphin). It prefers euphorbia bushes and low shrubs on sandy substrate or coral rag, and is found at elevations ranging from sea level to 200 m (660 ft).

== Conservation and threats ==
Although the littoral rock thrush has a restricted range, its population appears to be stable, and the IUCN lists it as a species of Least Concern. However, the scrub habitat which it prefers is among the most degraded in Madagascar, and its population centers are largely outside of protected areas. Threats included clearing of scrub for agriculture, logging for firewood, and the presence of roaming livestock.
