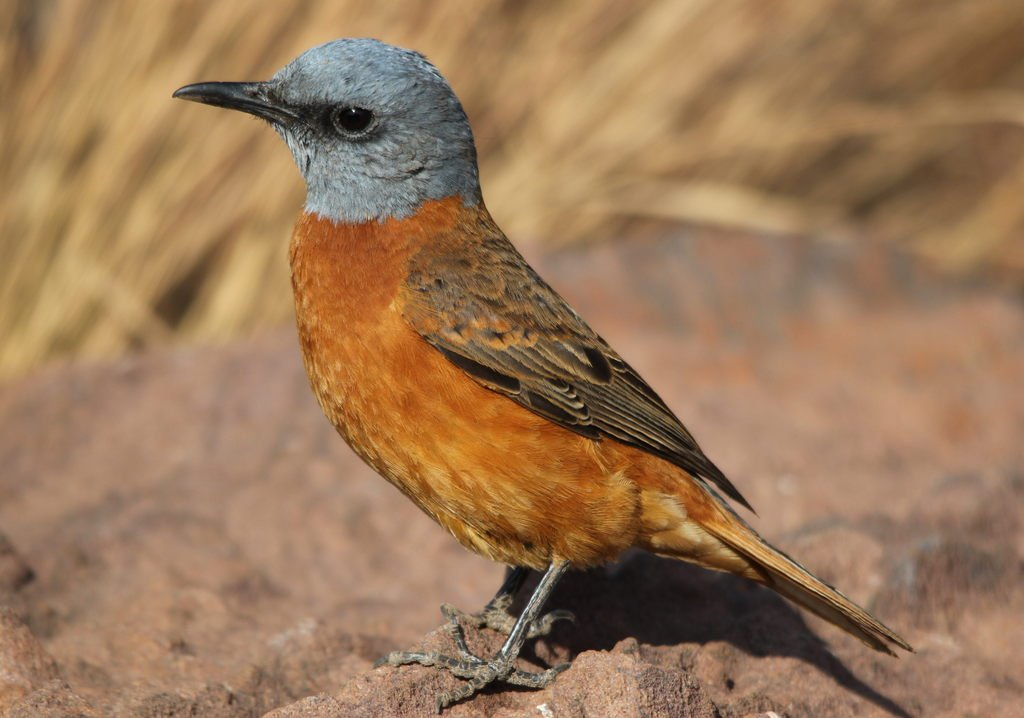
- Male in Marakele N.P., South Africa
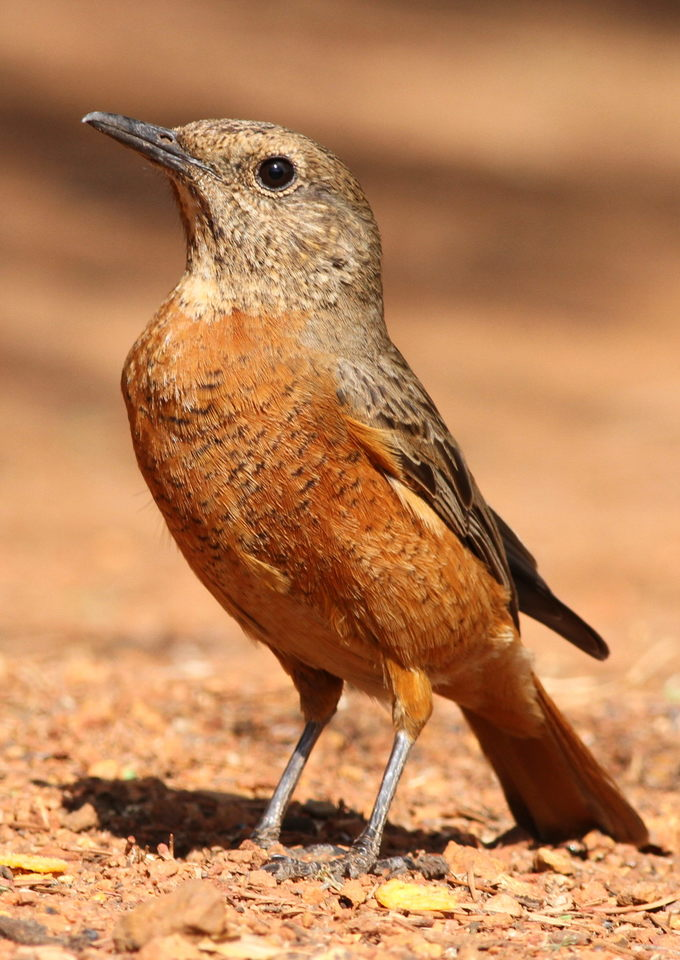
- Female at Suikerbosrand N.R. Song recorded in Transvaal Province, South Africa

Conservation status
- Least Concern (IUCN 3.1)

Scientific classification
- Kingdom: Animalia
- Phylum: Chordata
- Class: Aves
- Order: Passeriformes
- Family: Muscicapidae
- Genus: Monticola
- Species: M. rupestris

Binomial name
- Monticola rupestris (Vieillot, 1818)

= Cape rock thrush =

Species of bird

The Cape rock thrush (Monticola rupestris) is a member of the bird family Muscicapidae. This rock thrush breeds in eastern and southern South Africa, Lesotho and Eswatini. It is a common endemic resident, non-migratory apart from seasonal altitudinal movements in some areas.

This species breeds in mountainous rocky areas with scattered vegetation. It lays 2-3 eggs in a cup nest in a rock cavity or on a ledge. It eats a wide range of insects and other small animals, and some berries.

This is a large stocky rock thrush 19–21 cm (7.5–8.3 in) in length. The summer male has a blue-grey head, orange underparts and outer tail feathers, and brown wings and back.

Females have a brown head, but their underparts are a much richer orange than those of other female rock thrushes. The outer tail feathers are reddish, like the male's. Immatures are like the female, but the upperparts have buff spots and the underparts show black scaling.

The male Cape rock thrush has a whistled song tsee-tsee-tseet-chee-chweeeoo, and occasionally mimics other birds.
