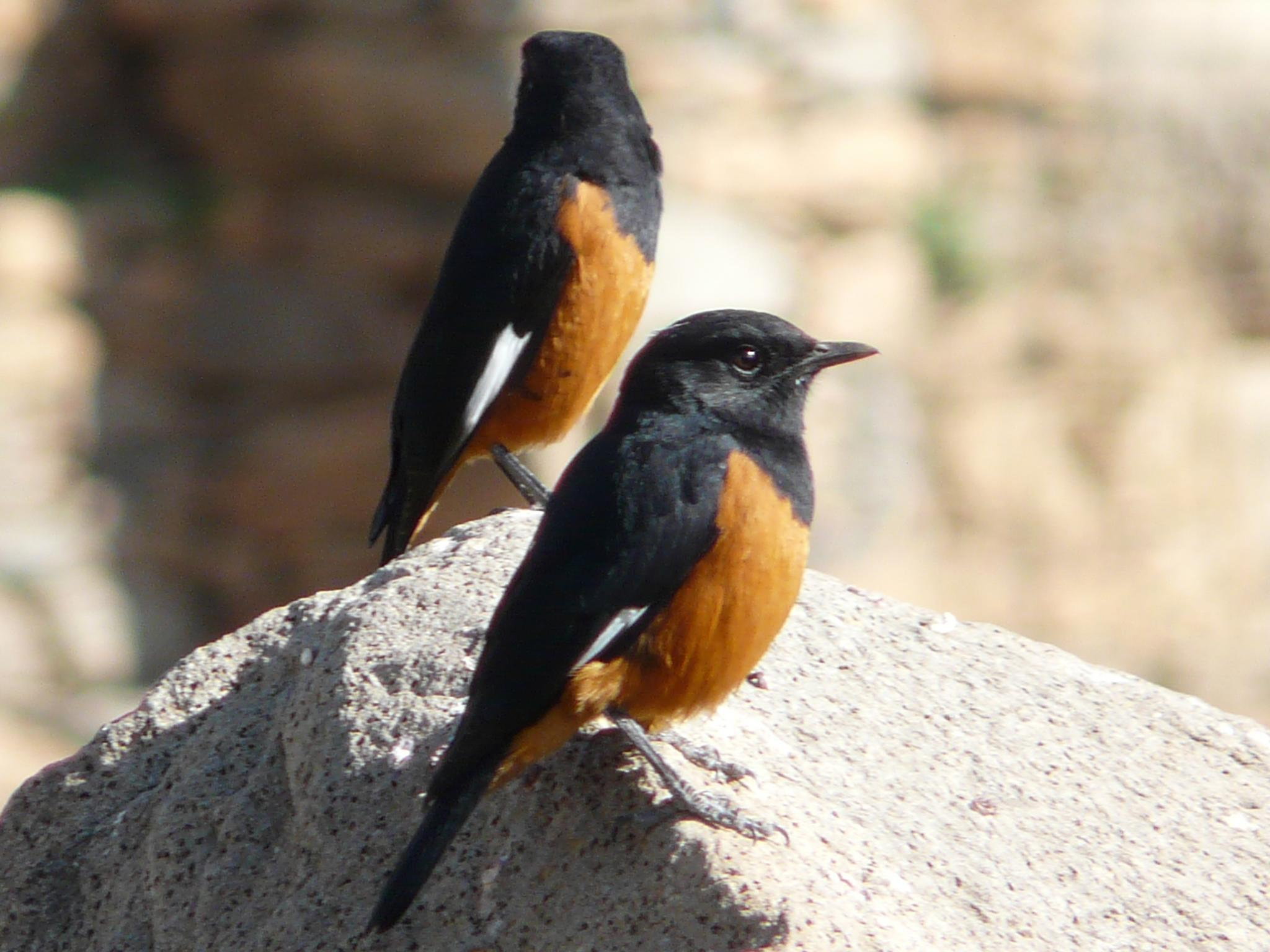
- Two males in Ethiopia

Conservation status
- Least Concern (IUCN 3.1)

Scientific classification
- Kingdom: Animalia
- Phylum: Chordata
- Class: Aves
- Order: Passeriformes
- Family: Muscicapidae
- Genus: Monticola
- Species: M. semirufus

Binomial name
- Monticola semirufus (Rüppell, 1837)

Synonyms
- Myrmecocichla semirufa; Thamnolaea semirufa

= White-winged cliff chat =

Species of bird

The white-winged cliff chat (Monticola semirufus) is a species of passerine bird in the Old World flycatcher family Muscicapidae. It is found in rocky wooded gorges, among boulders and in road cuttings within the Ethiopian Highlands.

This species was formerly placed in the genus Thamnolaea but was moved to Monticola based on the results of a molecular phylogenetic study published in 2010.

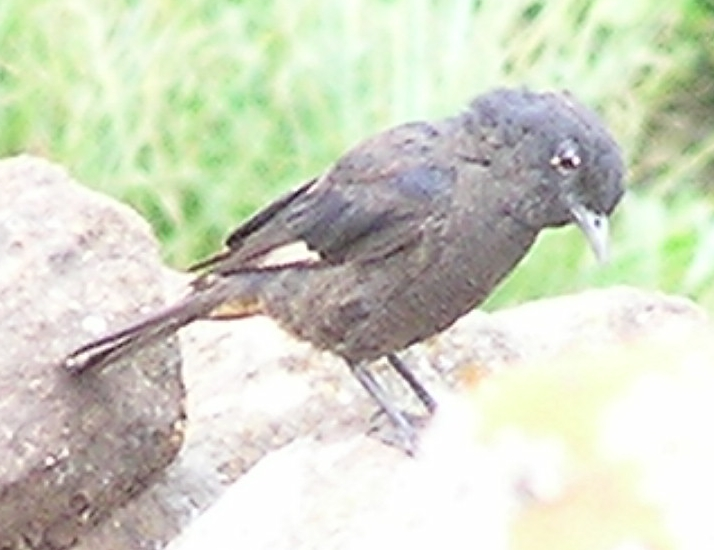
Female at Debre Berhan, Ethiopia

Length 19–21 cm. The male has a striking chestnut belly which the female lacks. Juvenile is spotted buff above and below. Both sexes show striking white secondaries in flight. The white patches in the primaries are diagnostic of this species.
