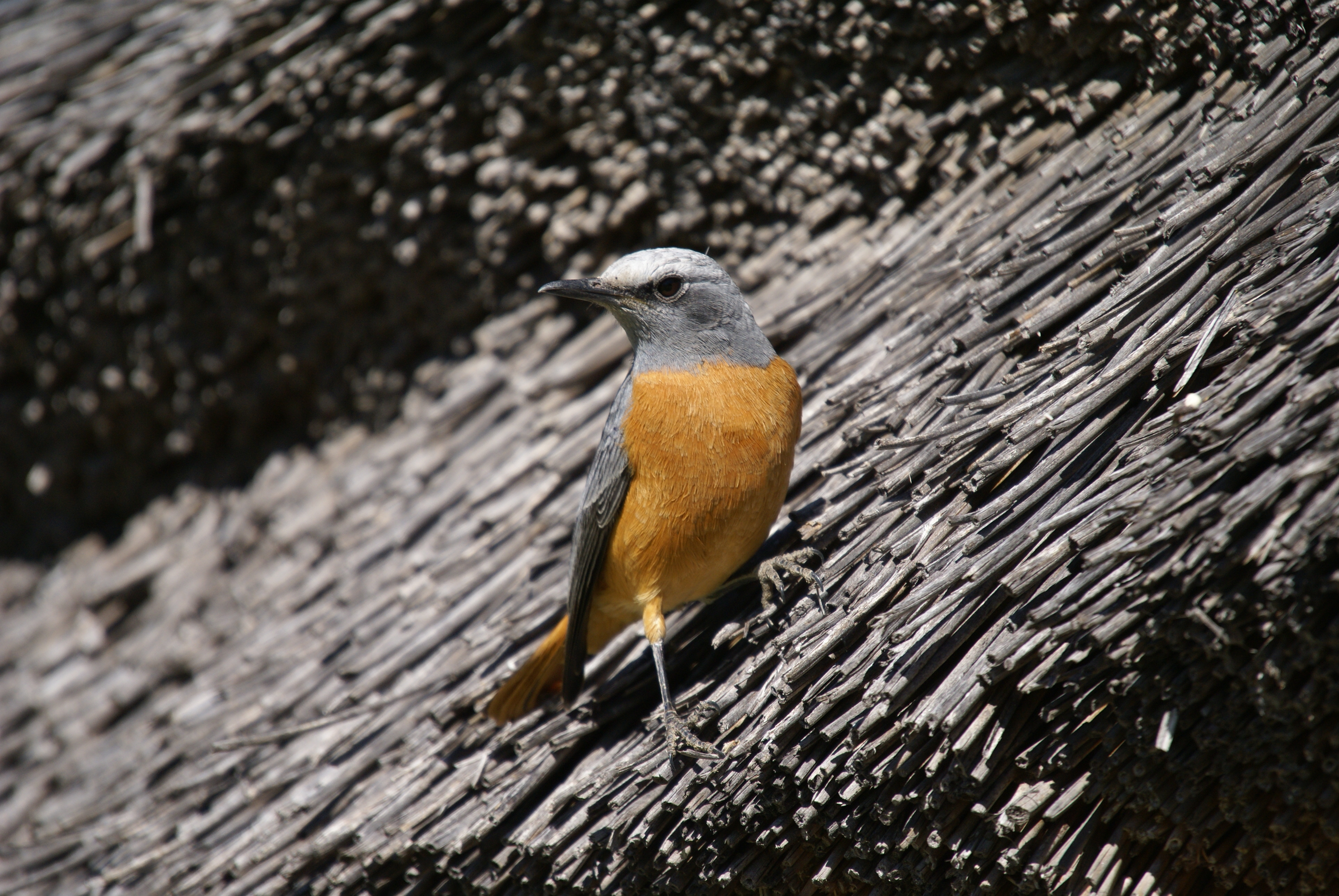
- Male short-toed rock thrush (Monticola brevipes)

Scientific classification
- Kingdom: Animalia
- Phylum: Chordata
- Class: Aves
- Order: Passeriformes
- Family: Muscicapidae
- Genus: Monticola; F. Boie, 1822

Type species
- Turdus saxatilis Linnaeus, 1766

Species
- See text

Synonyms
- Pseudocossyphus F Boie, 1826

= Rock thrush =

Rock thrushes

Genus of birds

The rock thrushes, Monticola, are a genus of chats, medium-sized mostly insectivorous or omnivorous songbirds. All are Old World birds, and most are associated with mountainous regions.

== Taxonomy ==
The genus Monticola was erected by the German naturalist Friedrich Boie in 1822. Boie listed two species, saxatilis and cyanus but did not designate the type species. In 1826 Boie introduced a different genus name, Petrocossyphus, containing a single species, Turdus saxatilis Linnaeus. This new genus name was not accepted by other ornithologists as according to Hugh Edwin Strickland: "The former name ought therefore to stand, as authors ought no more to alter their own generic names when once published than those of others". The type species of the genus Monticola is Turdus saxatilis Linnaeus, the common rock thrush. Monticola is the Latin word for mountain-dweller or mountaineer.

The genus was formerly included in the thrush family Turdidae, but molecular phylogenetic studies published in 2004 and 2010 showed that the species are more closely related to members of the Old World flycatcher family Muscicapidae.

The genus contains the following species:

Image	Common name	Scientific name	Distribution
	Blue-capped rock thrush	Monticola cinclorhyncha	Himalayas; winters to western and eastern Ghats
	White-throated rock thrush	Monticola gularis	Manchuria
	Chestnut-bellied rock thrush	Monticola rufiventris	Himalayas, Purvanchal Range and southern China
	Short-toed rock thrush	Monticola brevipes	arid areas of southwestern Angola and southern Africa
	Sentinel rock thrush	Monticola explorator	southern Africa
	Amber Mountain rock thrush	Monticola erythronotus	Amber Mountain, Madagascar
	Forest rock thrush	Monticola sharpei	Madagascar
	Benson's rock thrush	Monticola sharpei bensoni	southern-central Madagascar
	Littoral rock thrush	Monticola imerina	southern coastal Madagascar
	Little rock thrush	Monticola rufocinereus	eastern Afromontane
	Common rock thrush	Monticola saxatilis	temperate rocky regions of Palearctic; winters to Africa
	Blue rock thrush	Monticola solitarius	temperate and elevated areas of Palearctic; winters to Africa, Arabia and Indomalaya
	Cape rock thrush	Monticola rupestris	southern Africa
	Miombo rock thrush	Monticola angolensis	Miombo woodlands
	White-winged cliff chat	Monticola semirufus	Ethiopian Highlands

== Fossil record ==
Monticola pongraczi (Pliocene of Beremend, Hungary)
