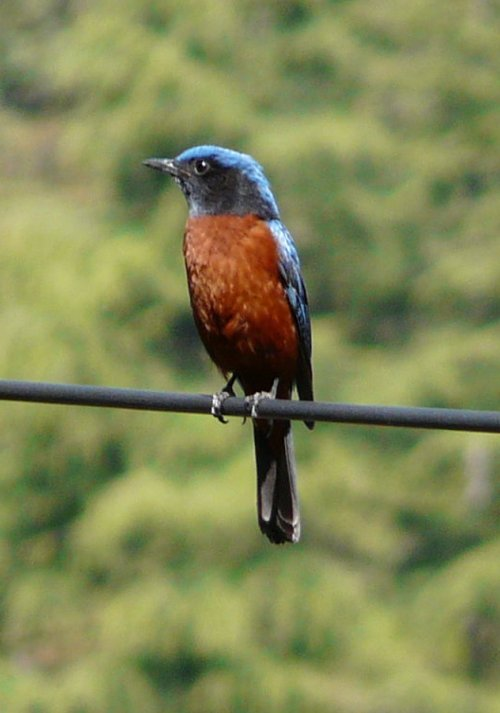
- Male at Dhanaulti, India.
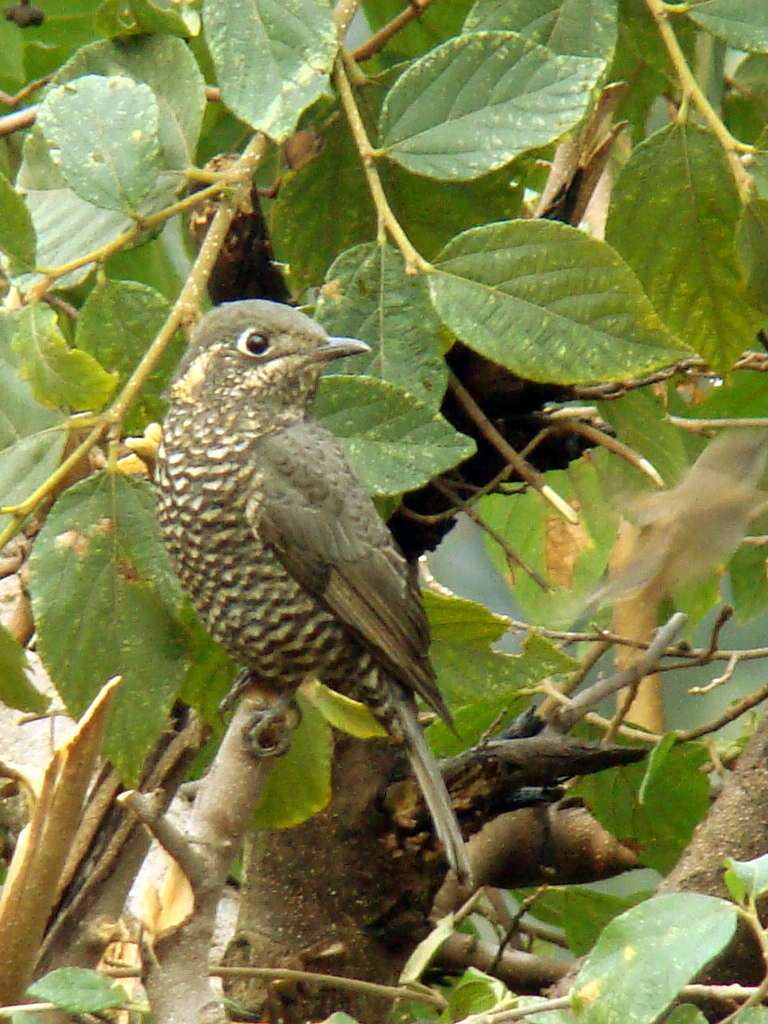
- Female at Kausani, India

Conservation status
- Least Concern (IUCN 3.1)

Scientific classification
- Kingdom: Animalia
- Phylum: Chordata
- Class: Aves
- Order: Passeriformes
- Family: Muscicapidae
- Genus: Monticola
- Species: M. rufiventris

Binomial name
- Monticola rufiventris (Jardine & Selby, 1833)

Synonyms
- Petrophila erythrogastra; Petrocincla rufiventris (protonym)

= Chestnut-bellied rock thrush =

Species of bird

The chestnut-bellied rock thrush (Monticola rufiventris) is a species of passerine bird in the Old World flycatcher family Muscicapidae.

== Description ==
The chestnut-bellied rock thrush is 21–23 cm (8.3–9.1 in) in overall length and weighs 48–61 g (1.7–2.2 oz). The male has a blue-grey crown and upperparts with darker lores and throat. The undersides are deep chestnut. The female has dull grey-brown upperparts and scalloped slate-grey with buffy-white underparts. The eyering and the post-auricular patch are whitish-buff.

== Habitat ==
Its natural habitat is temperate forests. It is an altitudanal migrant and experiences Zugunruhe strongly the night before migration.

== Range ==
It is native to the Himalayas, Purvanchal Range and southern China; some birds winter to northern Indochina.

== Taxonomy ==
The chestnut-bellied rock thrush was formally described in 1832 by the Irish zoologist Nicholas Vigors under the binomial name Turdus erythogaster. The identical name had been used for a different species by the Dutch naturalist Pieter Boddaert in 1783. The chestnut-bellied rock thrush was described again in 1833 by the English naturalists William Jardine and Prideaux John Selby under the binomial name Petrocincla rufiventris. They specified the locality as the "Himalayan region" but this was restricted to Shimla in Himachal Pradesh, India, by Sidney Dillon Ripley in 1961. The specific epithet rufiventris is Modern Latin meaning "red-bellied" from Latin rufus meaning "ruddy" or "rufous" and venter, ventris meaning "belly". The chestnut-bellied rock thrush is now one of the 15 species placed in the genus Monticola that was introduced in 1822 by the German naturalist Friedrich Boie. Monticola is the Latin word for mountain-dweller or mountaineer. The species is monotypic: no subspecies are recognised.
