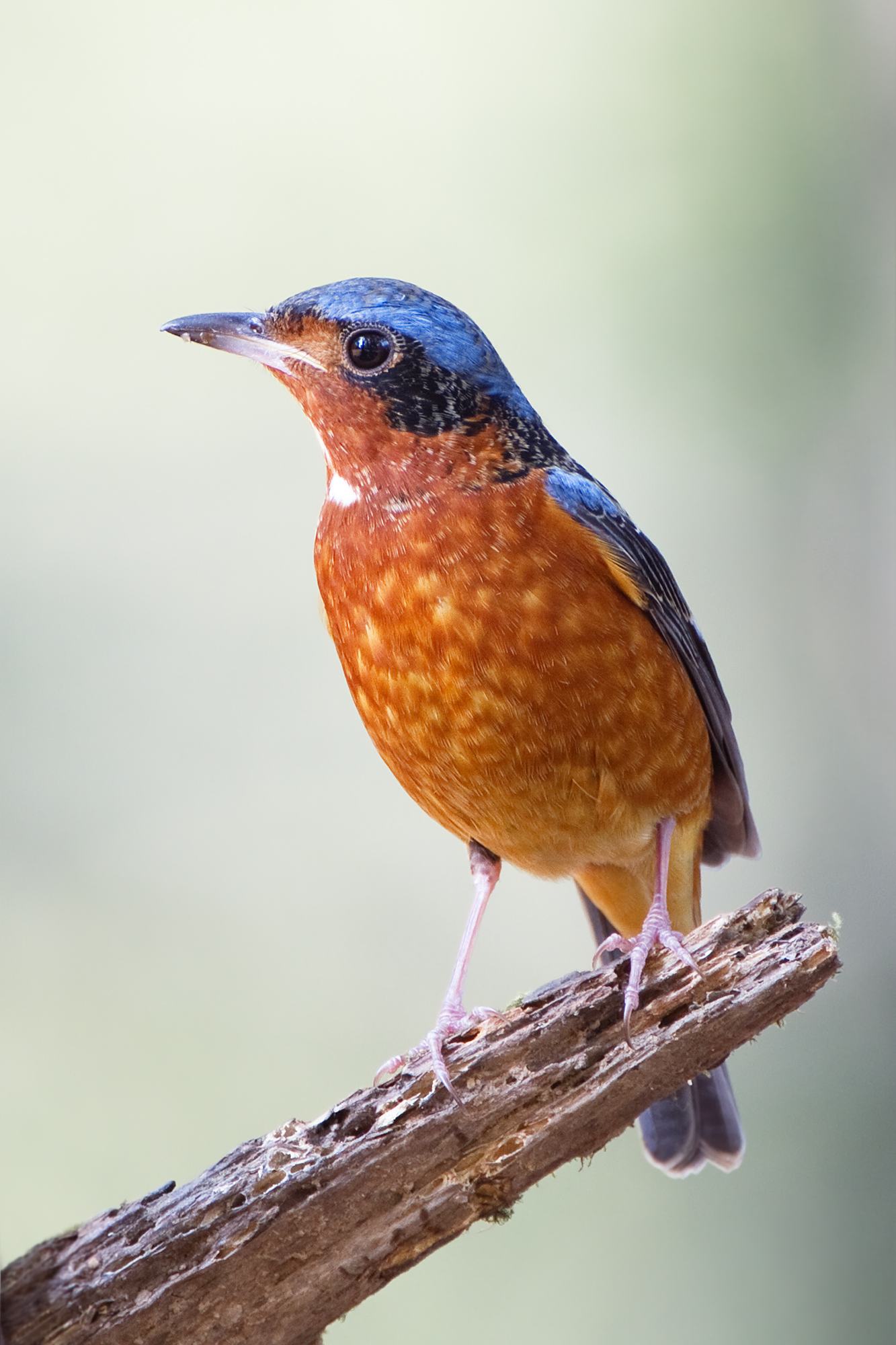
- Male, non-breeding
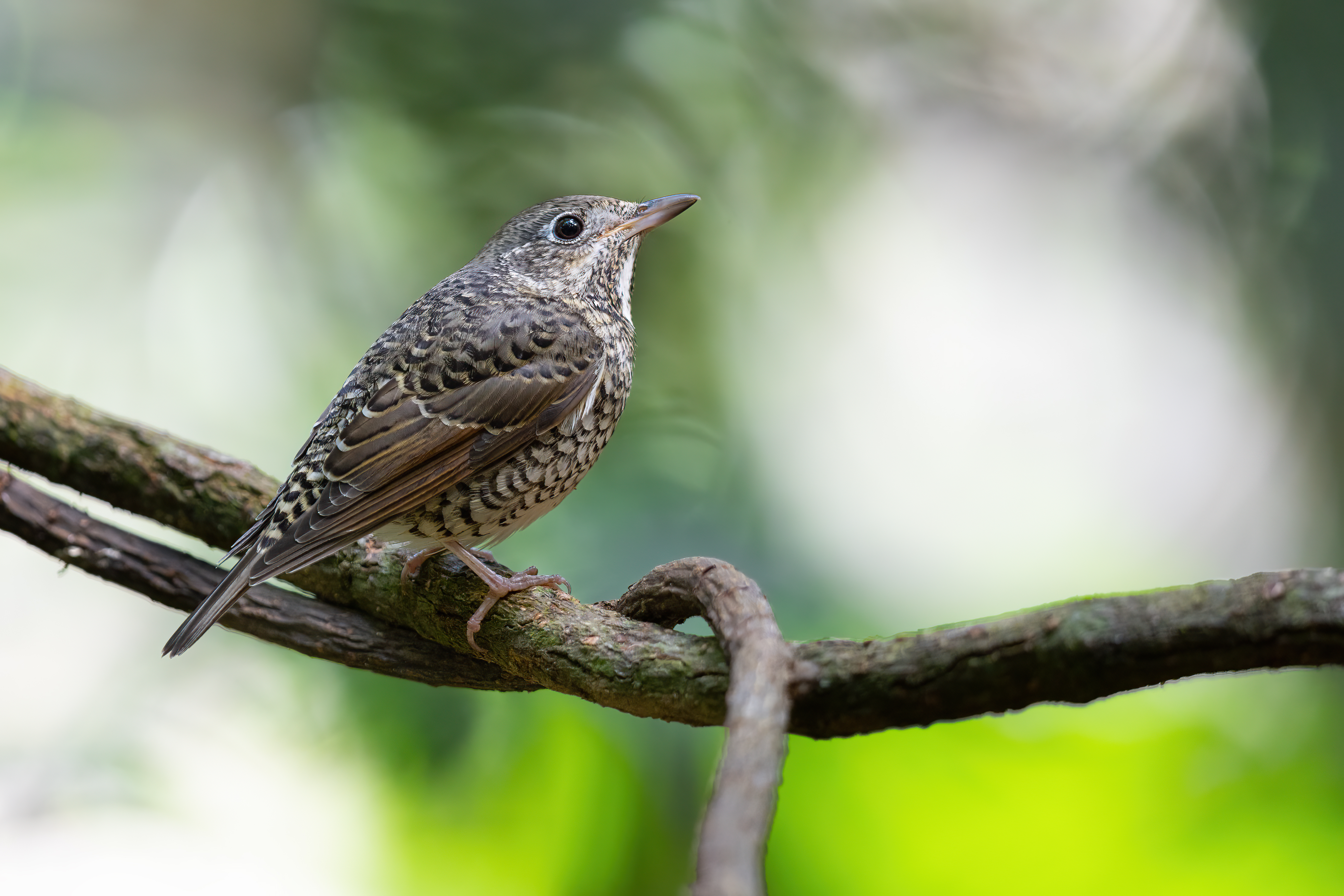
- Female

Conservation status
- Least Concern (IUCN 3.1)

Scientific classification
- Kingdom: Animalia
- Phylum: Chordata
- Class: Aves
- Order: Passeriformes
- Family: Muscicapidae
- Genus: Monticola
- Species: M. gularis

Binomial name
- Monticola gularis (R. Swinhoe, 1863)

= White-throated rock thrush =

Species of bird

The white-throated rock thrush (Monticola gularis) is a species of bird in the family Muscicapidae of the order Passeriformes.

The bird's natural habitats include temperate forests.

== Description, behavior, and diet ==
The white-throated rock thrush weighs 34 grams on average, although its weight ranges from 32 to 37 grams. The bird's length ranges from 16 to 19 centimetres (6.3 to 7.5 in). Its typical generation length is 3.8 years.

Adult male white-throated rock thrushes have white patches on their chins and throats. However, the rest of their undersides are a chestnut-orange color. Adult females have brown or olive-brown upper parts and "boldly scalloped" lower parts. Young males have gray or golden-brown feathers and orange undersides. The birds are also cobalt blue and black in places. The bird's song has been described as "melancholy, flute-like, drawn-out rising whistles".

== Behavior ==
White-throated rock thrushes inhabit their breeding grounds between May and September. Their breeding grounds are in mixed montane forests. They breed between May and July, forming two broods. The birds' cup-shaped nests consist of tree matter, lichen, rootlets, and moss on the inside and pine needles and stems on the outside.

The diet of white-throated rock thrushes consists mainly of invertebrates. These include weevils, mole crickets, and lepidopterans.

The white-throated rock thrush is a fully migrant species.

== Distribution and habitat ==
The white-throated rock thrush has a very sizable range, 1,710,000 square kilometers. It is native and breeds in Manchuria, the Russian Far East and neighboring areas; it winters in Indochina and southern China. The birds are occasionally seen in Japan. They have also been observed in Hong Kong and Singapore. The bird's population is unknown, but is not increasing or declining.

The white-throated rock thrush is said to be rare in North Korea. However, it is relatively common in China, except on the coast.

The bird's IUCN Red List category is "least concern".

The white-throated rock thrush inhabits forested areas, shrubland and rocky areas. It lives in altitudes ranging between 0 metres (0 ft) and 1,500 metres (4,900 ft).

== History ==
The white-throated rock thrush was first described by Robert Swinhoe in 1863.

Between 1988 and 2000, the bird's IUCN Red List categories have been "lower risk" and "least concern". Since 2000, its only category has been "least concern".

In modern times, white-throated rock thrushes are widely kept as pets. They are also consumed in some countries.
