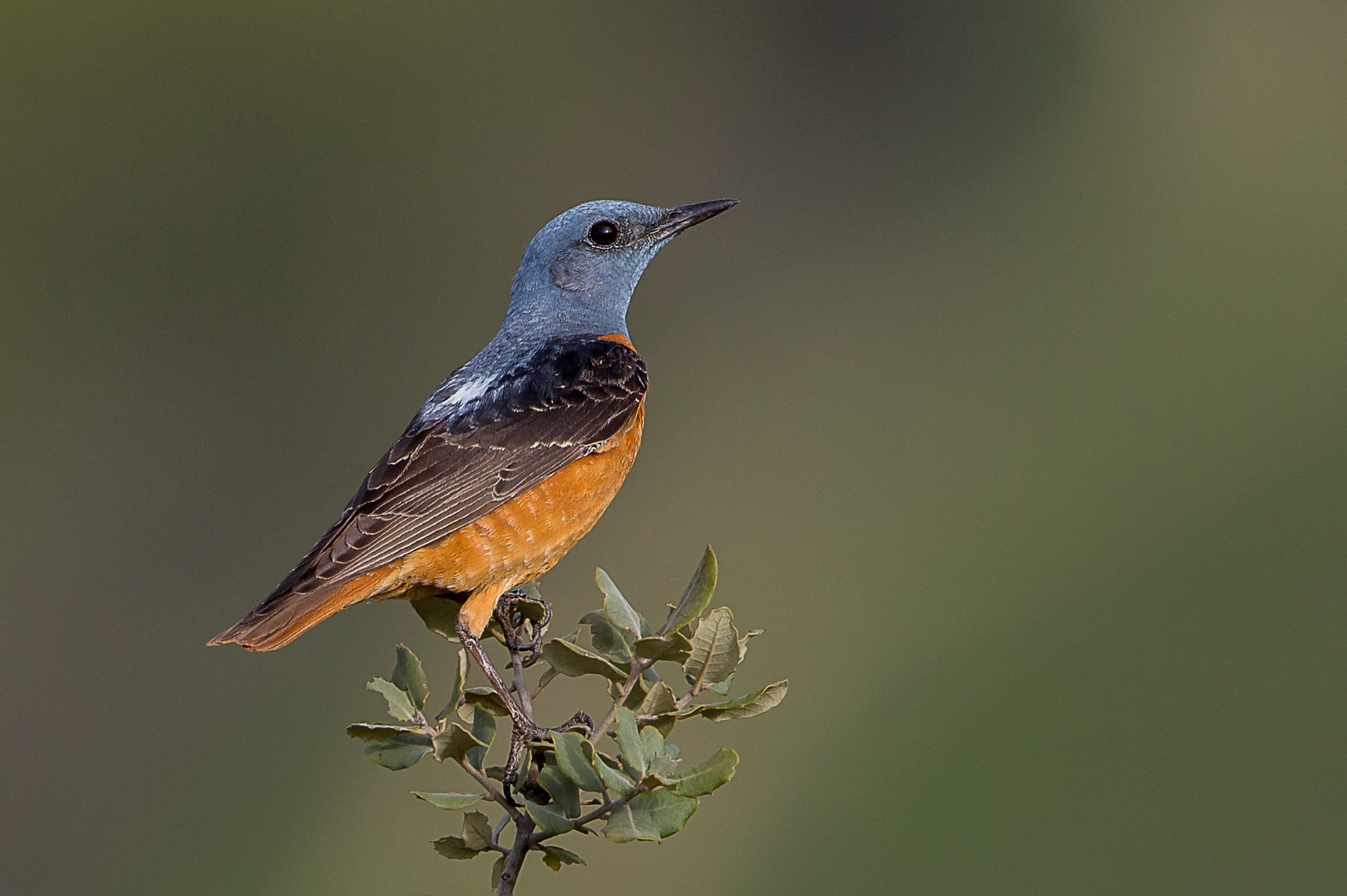
- male, Spain

Conservation status
- Least Concern (IUCN 3.1)

Scientific classification
- Kingdom: Animalia
- Phylum: Chordata
- Class: Aves
- Order: Passeriformes
- Family: Muscicapidae
- Genus: Monticola
- Species: M. saxatilis

Binomial name
- Monticola saxatilis (Linnaeus, 1766)
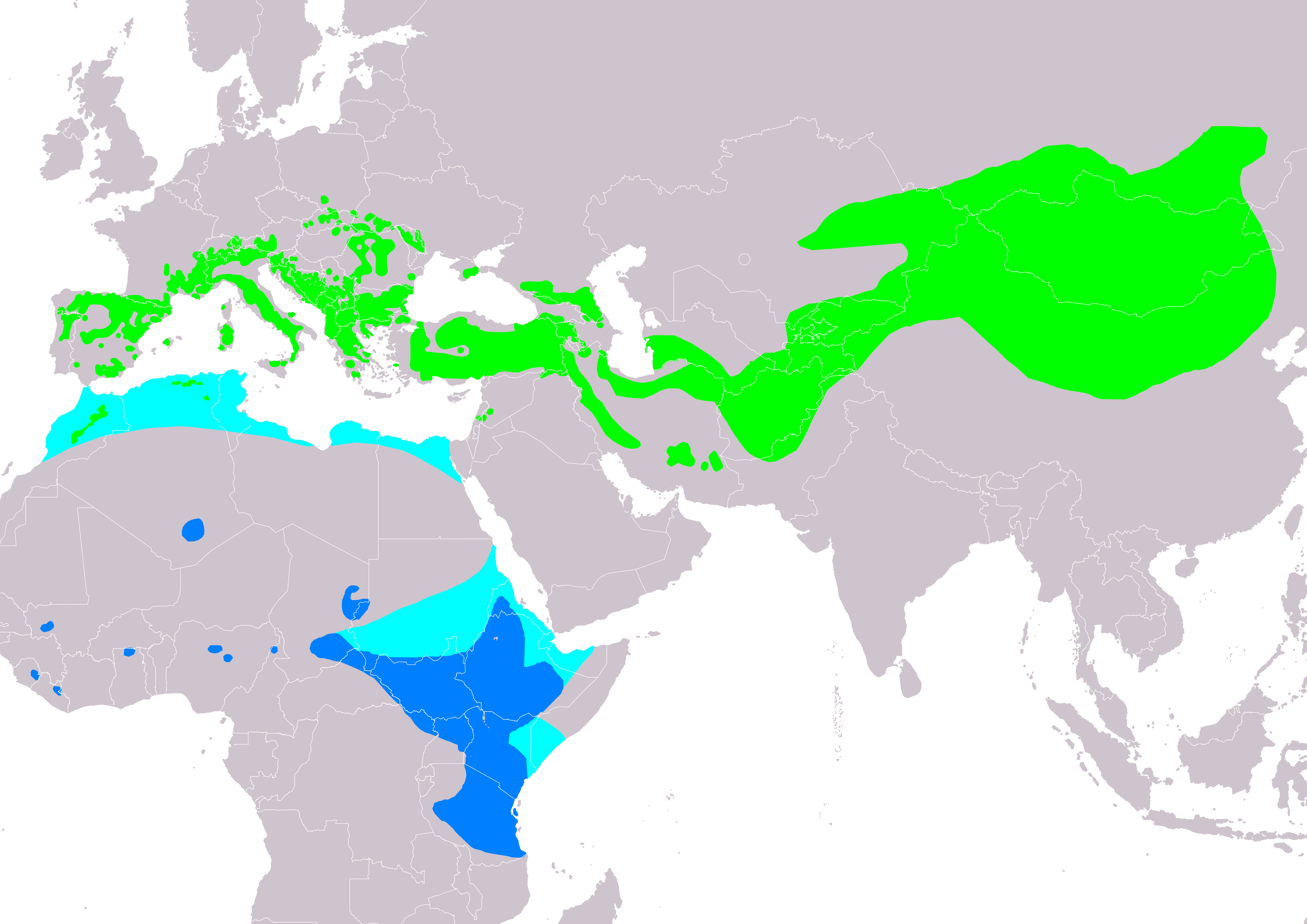
- Range of M. saxatilis Breeding Passage Non-breeding

Synonyms
- Turdus saxatilis Linnaeus, 1766

= Common rock thrush =

Species of bird

The common rock thrush (Monticola saxatilis), also known as the rufous-tailed rock thrush or simply rock thrush, is a species of chat that breeds in southern Europe across Central Asia to northern China. This species is strongly migratory, all populations wintering in Africa south of the Sahara. It is an uncommon visitor to northern Europe. Its range has contracted somewhat at the periphery in recent decades due to habitat destruction. For example, in the early 20th century it bred in the Jura Krakowsko-Częstochowska (Poland) where none occur today, but it is not considered globally endangered.

== Taxonomy ==
The common rock thrush was formally described in 1766 by the Swedish naturalist Carl Linnaeus in the twelfth edition of his Systema Naturae under the binomial name Turdus saxatilis. Linnaeus cited an earlier description by the French zoologist Mathurin Jacques Brisson. The common rock thrush is now one of 15 species placed in the genus Monticola that was introduced in 1822 by the German naturalist Friedrich Boie. The species is monotypic: no subspecies are recognised. The scientific name is from Latin: Monticola is from mons, montis "mountain", and colere, "to dwell", and saxatilis means "rock-frequenting", from saxum, "stone" . The type locality is Switzerland.

== Description ==
This is a medium-sized but stocky thrush 17–20 cm in length. The summer male is unmistakable, with a blue-grey head, orange underparts and outer tail feathers, dark brown wings and white back. Females and immatures are much less striking, with dark brown scaly upperparts, and paler brown scaly underparts. The outer tail feathers are reddish, like the male.

== Behaviour and ecology ==
This species breeds in open dry hilly areas, usually above 1500 m. It nests in rock cavities, laying 4–5 eggs. It is omnivorous, eating a wide range of insects, berries and small reptiles. The male common rock thrush has a clear and tuneful song.

== Gallery ==
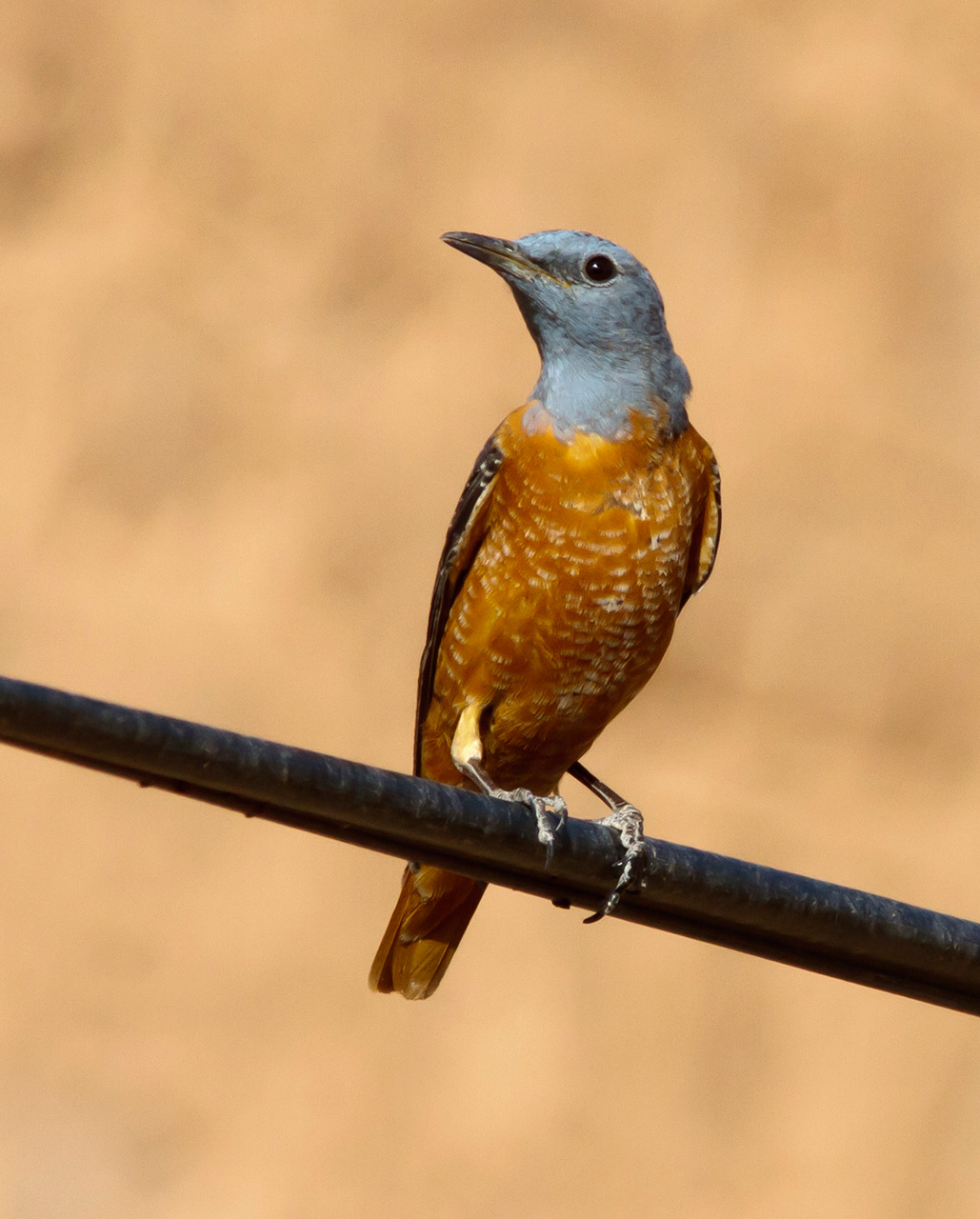
Common rock thrush, Boulmane de Dades, Morocco

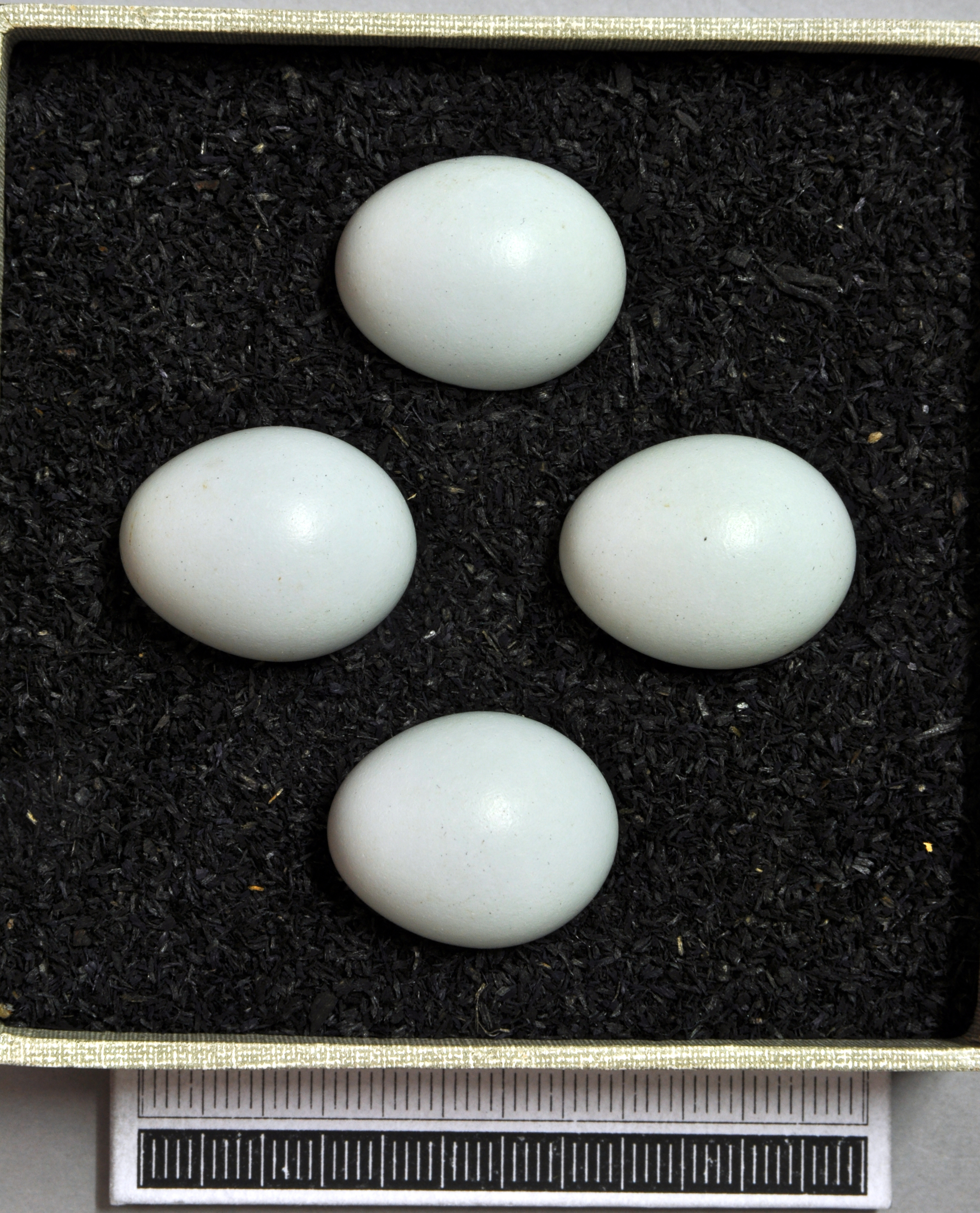
Eggs, Collection Museum Wiesbaden
