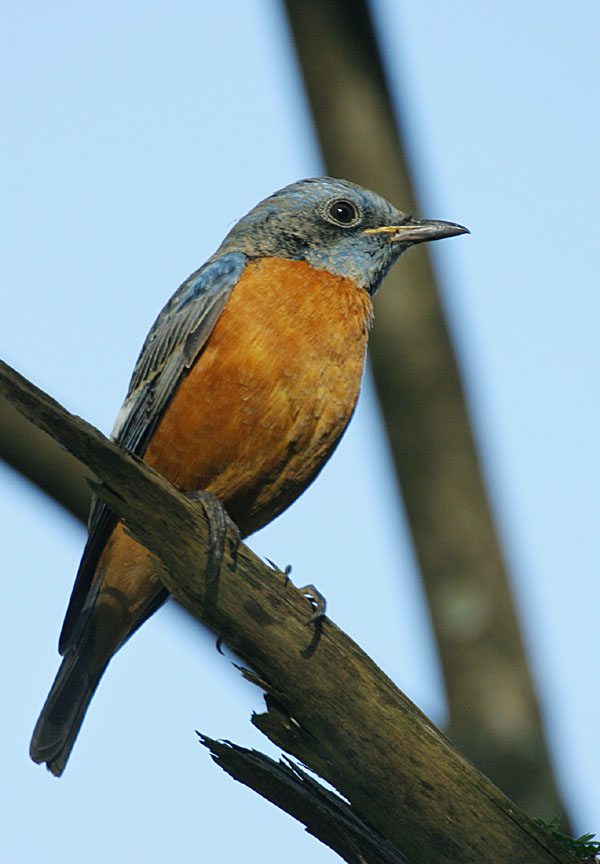

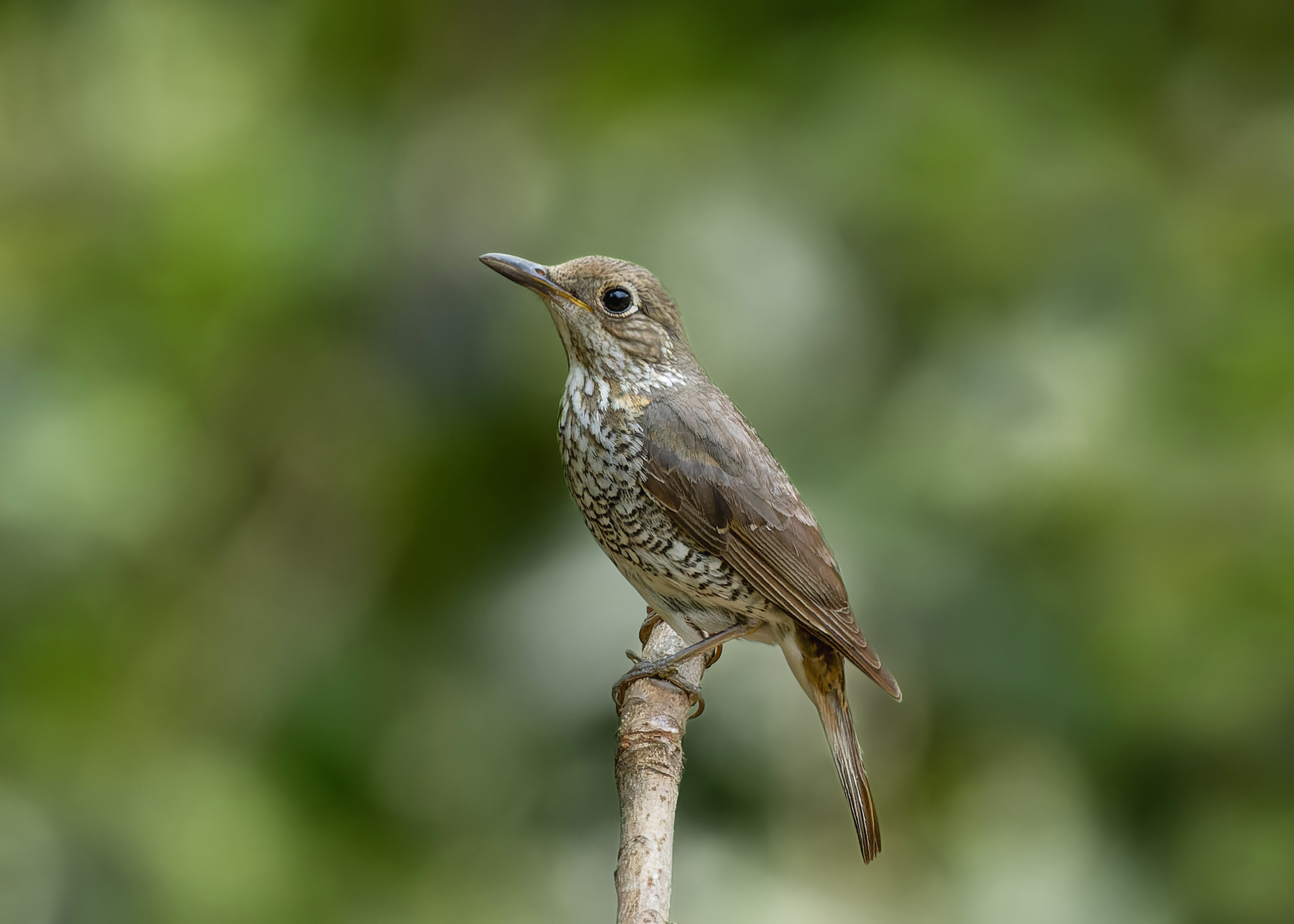
- Monticola cinclorhyncha female in Kolakham, West Bengal, India

Conservation status
- Least Concern (IUCN 3.1)

Scientific classification
- Kingdom: Animalia
- Phylum: Chordata
- Class: Aves
- Order: Passeriformes
- Family: Muscicapidae
- Genus: Monticola
- Species: M. cinclorhyncha

Binomial name
- Monticola cinclorhyncha (Vigors, 1831)

Synonyms
- Monticola cinclorhynchus

= Blue-capped rock thrush =

Species of bird

The blue-capped rock thrush (Monticola cinclorhyncha) is a species of bird in the family Muscicapidae.

== Description ==
Molem, Goa, India Nov 1997

The male has a blue head, chin and throat. The upper parts are blue and black. The rump and underparts are chestnut brown. There is a white patch on the wing that is visible during flight. The female bird is brown with a brown and white underside.

== Distribution and breeding ==
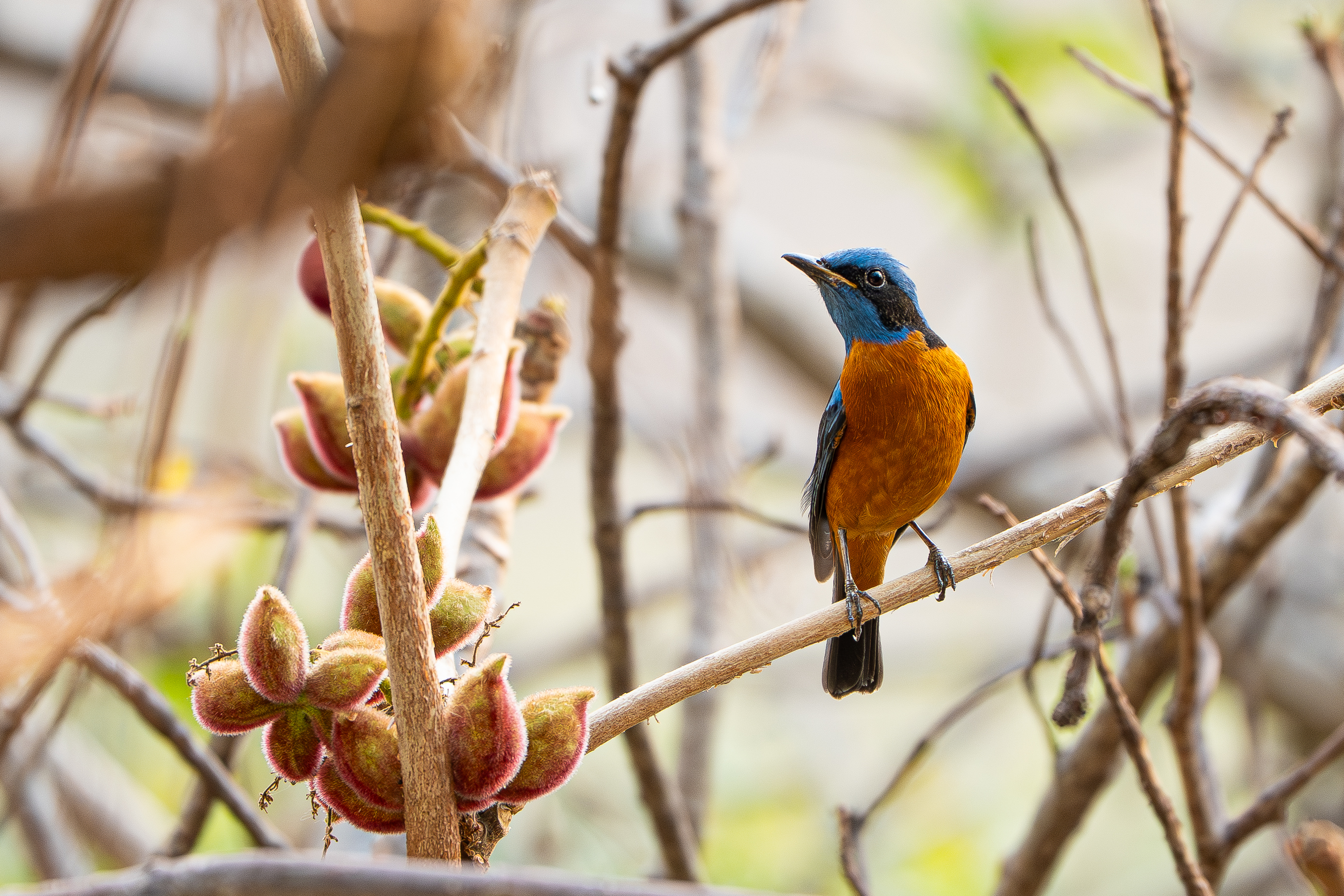
Male Blue-capped Rock Thrush perched on Sterculia urens, Yercaud, Tamil Nadu, India

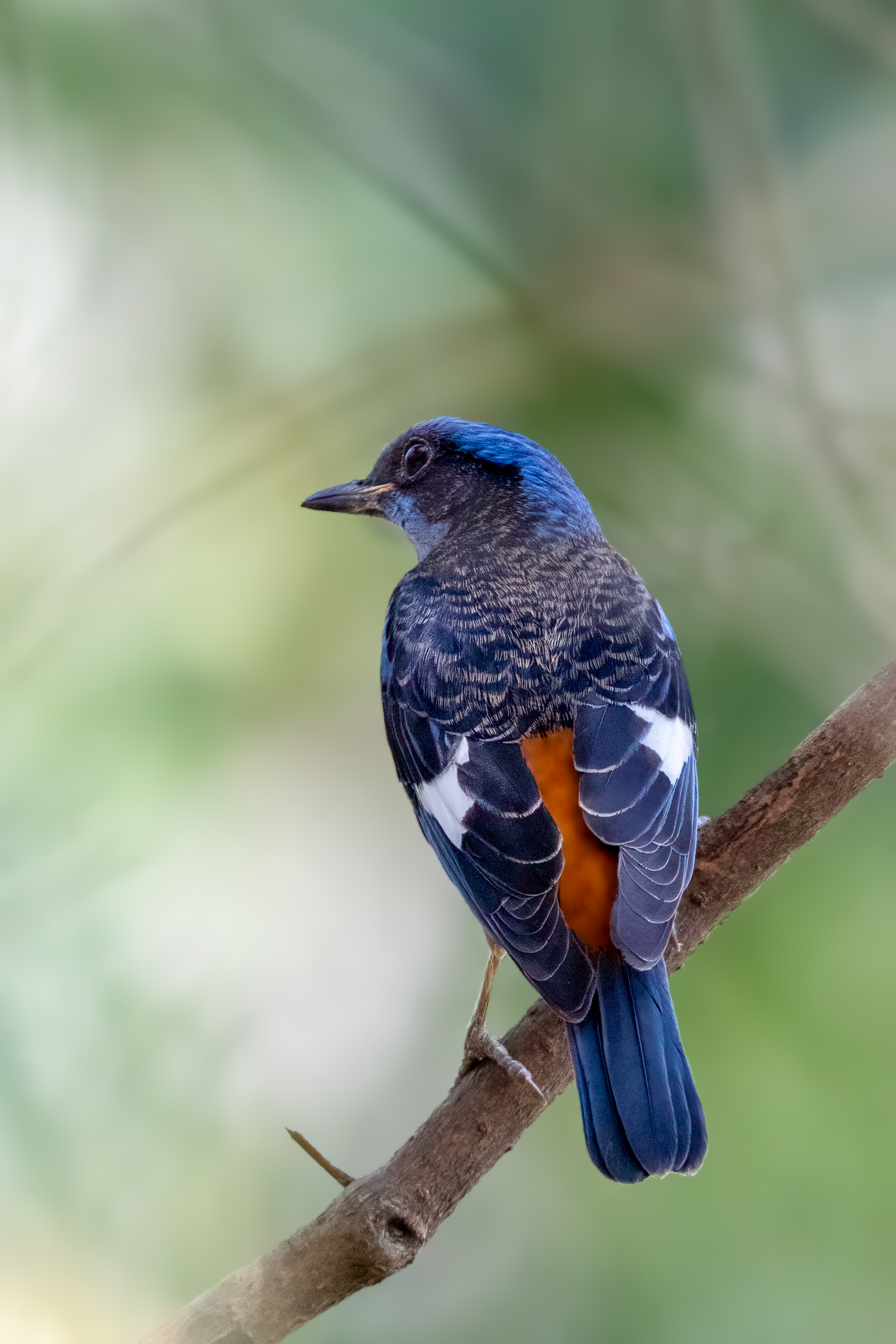
Blue Capped Rock Thrush in Nepal.

The blue-capped rock thrush breeds in dense forests in the Himalayas and winters in the lowlands of southern India. During winter it is found primarily in the Western Ghats and Eastern Ghats of southern India.

== Habits ==
Like thrushes, they fly up into trees and sit motionless when they are disturbed. It is a summer visitor in parts of Afghanistan and along the Himalayas from Pakistan to Arunachal Pradesh. In summer it is found in pine forests and hill slopes. In winter it is found in dense canopied forests.
