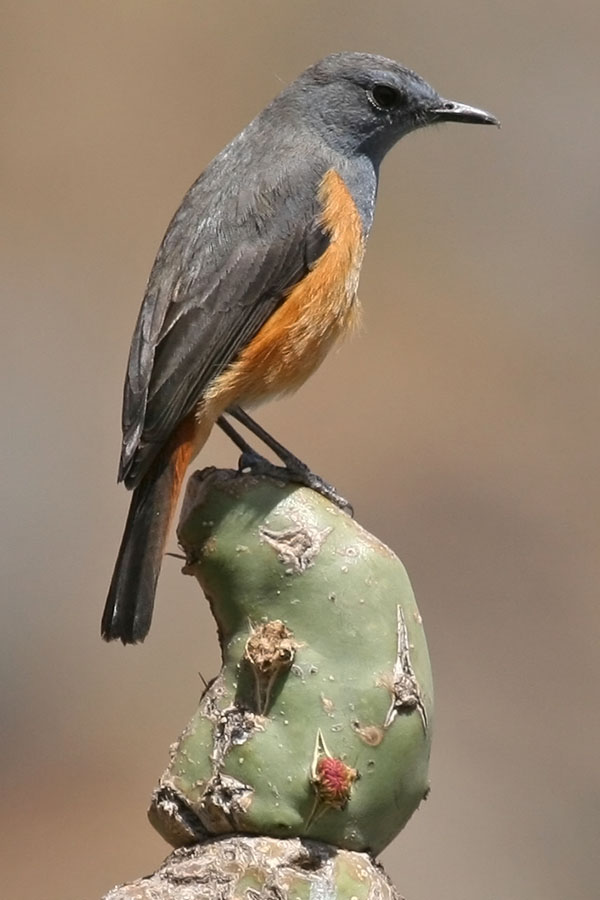

Conservation status
- Least Concern (IUCN 3.1)

Scientific classification
- Kingdom: Animalia
- Phylum: Chordata
- Class: Aves
- Order: Passeriformes
- Family: Muscicapidae
- Genus: Monticola
- Species: M. rufocinereus

Binomial name
- Monticola rufocinereus (Rüppell, 1837)

= Little rock thrush =

Species of bird

The little rock thrush (Monticola rufocinereus) is a species of passerine bird in the family Muscicapidae. It is found in Eritrea, Ethiopia, Kenya, Oman, Saudi Arabia, Somalia, South Sudan, Tanzania, Uganda, and Yemen. It is found in rocky (inland cliffs and mountain peaks) areas with some trees, and sometimes near settlements. At 15 to 16 centimetres (5.9 to 6.3 in) this is the smallest of the Muscicapidae. The male has the head, throat and upper mantle blue-grey, the underparts orange-red, except for the center blackish center tail and tips which form an inverted T shape. The female is duller and paler. It is readily mistaken for a redstart because of its habit of trembling its tail.

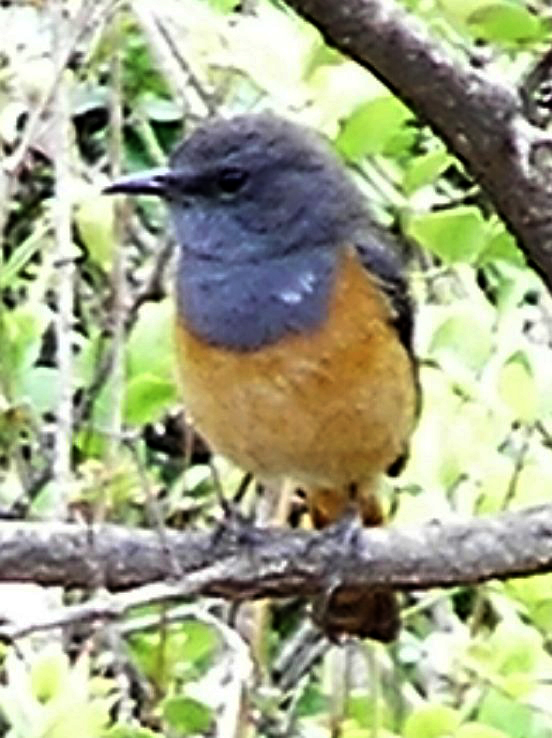
Little rock thrush in the gorge at Debre Berhan, Ethiopia

== Works cited ==
- Sinclair, Ian; Ryan, Peter (2003). Birds of Africa south of the Sahara. Cape Town: Struik.
- Stevenson, Terry; Fanshawe, John (2002). A Field Guide to the Birds of East Africa.
